= Dobromierz Transmitter =

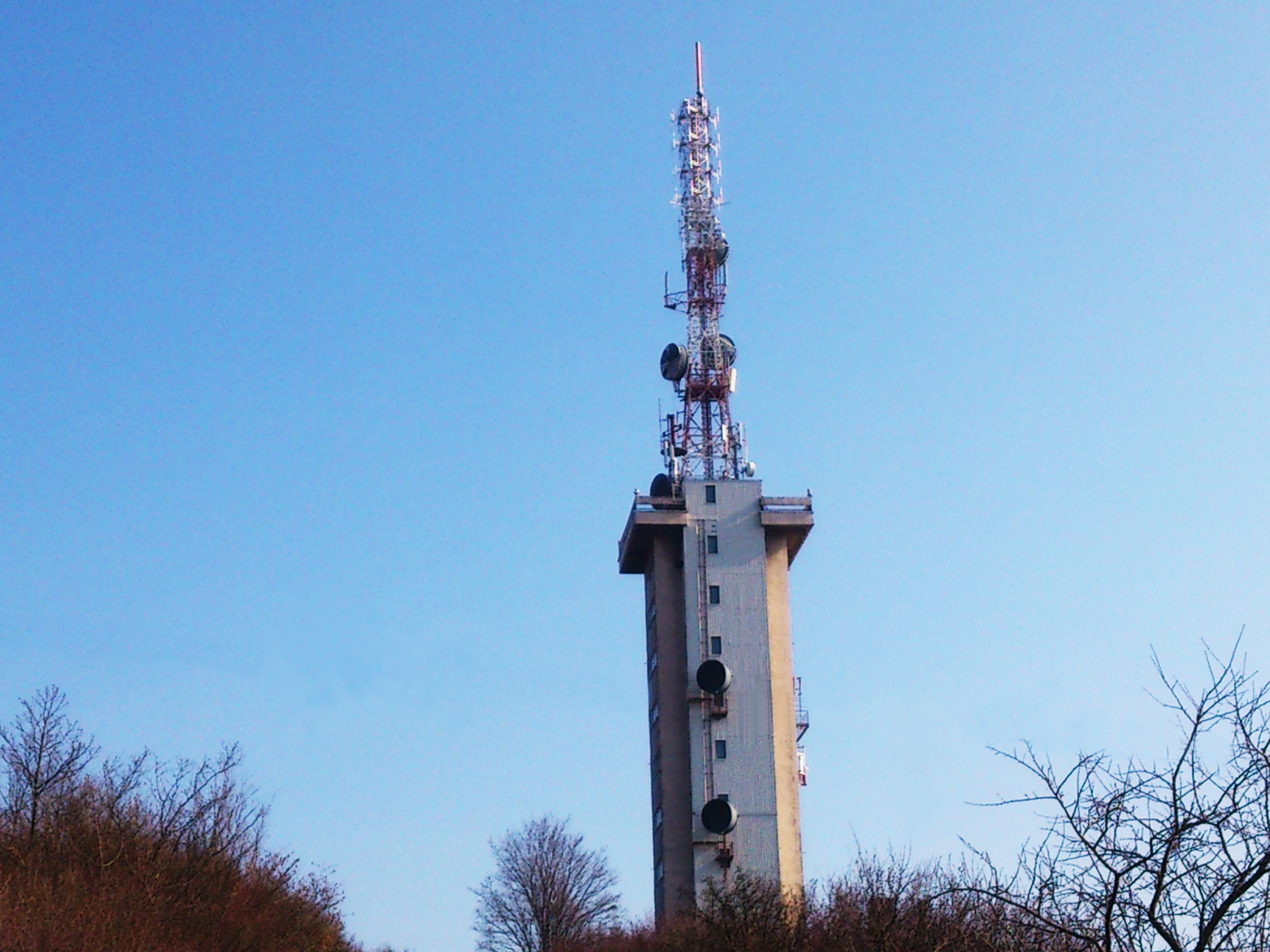
- Interactive map of the Dobromierz Transmitter area

General information
- Status: Completed
- Type: Steel mast on the Concrete Tower
- Location: Dobromierz, Poland
- Coordinates: 50°59′59″N 19°55′30″E

Height
- Height: 88 m (288.71 ft)

Dobromierz Transmitter (Polish: SLR Dobromierz) is an 88 metre tall Radio and Television tower situated in Dobromierz, Poland. On the top of this concrete tower, there is a horizontal steel cross. At the ends of the crossarms, which are equipped with gangways, the antenna mast on its top.

== Transmitted programs ==
The tower is used for transmitting the following FM and TV programs

== FM radio ==
| Program | Frequency MHz | ERP kW | Polarisation | Antenna Diagram around (ND) / directional (D) |
|---|---|---|---|---|
| Polskie Radio Program I | 88.90 | 3,2 | Vertical | ND |
| Radio eM Kielce | 94.40 | 0,4 | Vertical | ND |
| RMF FM | 97.10 | 12 | Vertical | ND |
| Polskie Radio Kielce | 100.00 | 3 | Vertical | ND |
| RMF MAXXX Kielce | 101.10 | 1,51 | Vertical | ND |

=== Digital Television DVB-T2 ===
| Multiplex | Programs in Multiplex | Frequency MHz | Channel | ERP kW | Polarisation | Antenna Diagram around (ND) / directional (D) | Modulation | FEC |
|---|---|---|---|---|---|---|---|---|
| MUX 1 | Antena HD; Fokus TV; Stopklatka TV; TV Trwam; Eska TV; TTV; Polo TV | 546 | 30 | 10 | Horizontal | ND | HEVC 256 - QAM | 1/128 |
| MUX 2 | Polsat; TVN; TV4; TV Puls; TVN 7; Puls 2; TV6; Super Polsat | 658 | 44 | 5,01 | Horizontal | ND | HEVC 256- QAM | 1/128 |
| MUX 3 | TVP1 HD; TVP2 HD; TVP3 Kielce; TVP Historia; TVP Sport; TVP Info HD | 682 | 47 | 9 | Horizontal | ND | HEVC 256 - QAM | 1/128 |
| MUX 6 | Alfa TVP; Belsat TV; TVP ABC; TVP Dokument; TVP Kobieta; TVP Kultura; TVP Nauka; TVP Polonia; TVP Rozrywka | 530 | 28 | 10 | Horizontal | ND | HEVC 256 - QAM | 1/128 |
| MUX 8 | Metro TV; Zoom TV; Nowa TV; WP | 205,5 | 9 | 4,2 | Horizontal | ND | 64 - QAM | 5/6 |

== See also ==
- List of towers
