= FM- and TV-mast Klepaczka =

FM/TV Mast Klepaczka/Wręczyca Wielka
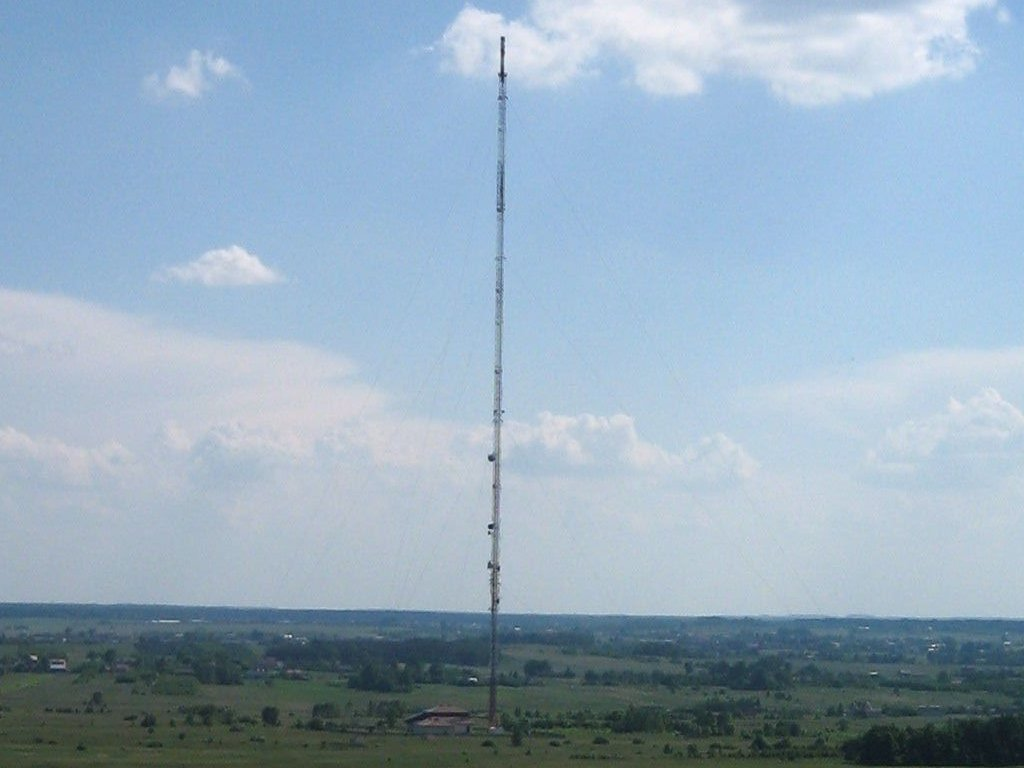
- Interactive map of the FM/TV Mast Klepaczka/Wręczyca Wielka area

General information
- Status: Completed
- Type: TV Mast
- Location: Klepaczka, Kłobuck County, Poland
- Completed: 1997

Height
- Height: 340 m (1,115.49 ft)

Klepaczka Mast
- Coordinates: 50°51′02″N 18°51′25″E
- Voivodeship: Silesian Voivodeship
- County: Kłobuck County
- Gmina: Wręczyca Wielka

The FM/TV Mast Wręczyca Wielka/Klepaczka is a 340-metre-tall (1,120 ft) guyed mast for FM and TV situated at Klepaczka, Kłobuck County, Silesian Voivodeship in Poland. The FM/TV Mast Wręczyca Wielka/Klepaczka, which was built in 1997, is since the collapse of the Warsaw radio mast the fifth tallest structure in Poland. The site is also known as Wręczyca Transmitter.

== Transmitted programs ==
=== FM radio ===
Program	Frequency MHz	ERP kW	Polarisation	Antenna Diagram around (ND) / directional (D)
Polskie Radio Program IV	87.50	10	Horizontal	D
Polskie Radio Program II	90.60	60	Horizontal	D
Polskie Radio Program III	91.70	60	Horizontal	D
Polskie Radio Katowice	98.40	60	Horizontal	D
Radio Jasna Góra	100.60	60	Horizontal	D
Radio ZET	103.40	60	Horizontal	D
RMF FM	105.90	60	Horizontal	D

=== Digital television MPEG-4 ===
Multiplex	Programs in Multiplex	Frequency MHz	Channel	ERP kW	Polarisation	Antenna Diagram around (ND) / directional (D)	Modulation	FEC
MUX 1	Fokus TV; Stopklatka TV; TVP ABC; TV Trwam; Eska TV; TTV; Polo TV; ATM Rozrywka	586	35	100	Horizontal	ND	64 - QAM	3/4
MUX 2	Polsat; TVN; TV4; TV Puls; TVN 7; Puls 2; TV6; Super Polsat	618	39	100	Horizontal	ND	64 - QAM	3/4
MUX 3	TVP1 HD; TVP2 HD; TVP3 Katowice; TVP Kultura; TVP Historia; TVP Sport; TVP Info HD	634	41	80	Horizontal	D	64 - QAM	5/6
MUX 8	Metro TV; Zoom TV; Nowa TV; WP	205,5	9	8	Vertical	D	64 - QAM	5/6

== See also ==
- List of masts
