= TVP Seriale =

Television channel in Poland

- Logo
- Country: Poland

Programming
- Picture format: 16:9 576i (SDTV); 1080i (HDTV)

Ownership
- Owner: Telewizja Polska
- Sister channels: TVP1; TVP2; TVP HD; TVP ABC; Alfa TVP; TVP Dokument; TVP Historia; TVP Info; TVP Kobieta; TVP Nauka; TVP Parlament; TVP Polonia; TVP Rozrywka; TVP Kultura; TVP Sport; TVP World

History
- Launched: 6 December 2010

Availability

Terrestrial
- Polish Digital: MUX 6 (Channel 30) (HD)

TVP Seriale is a theme channel owned by the Polish public broadcaster TVP. Launched on 6 December 2010, the channel airs TV series produced by the broadcaster.

== History ==
TVP Seriale was announced in October 2010 (with its license granted in January of that year), due for a 6 December (Saint Nicholas Day) 2010 launch. At the time of announcement, it released an announcement to cable companies interested in having the channel in their offers. A digital terrestrial test signal was transmitted from the RTCN Śrem transmitter carrying an advertisement for the channel. At launch time, it catered a female 35-49 demographic.

From the beginning, it was meant to be a Polish alternative to the movie and series channels in the local market, which specialize in foreign productions. For TVP's sixtieth anniversary in October 2012, the channel aired a special cycle with old productions from the 1970s and 1980s. As of January 2024, it was the leading movie and series channel in Poland, with an average share of 1,30%.

On 27 February 2023, the channel started broadcasting in high definition and began rolling said feed to providers.
