= RTCN Suwałki (Krzemianucha) =

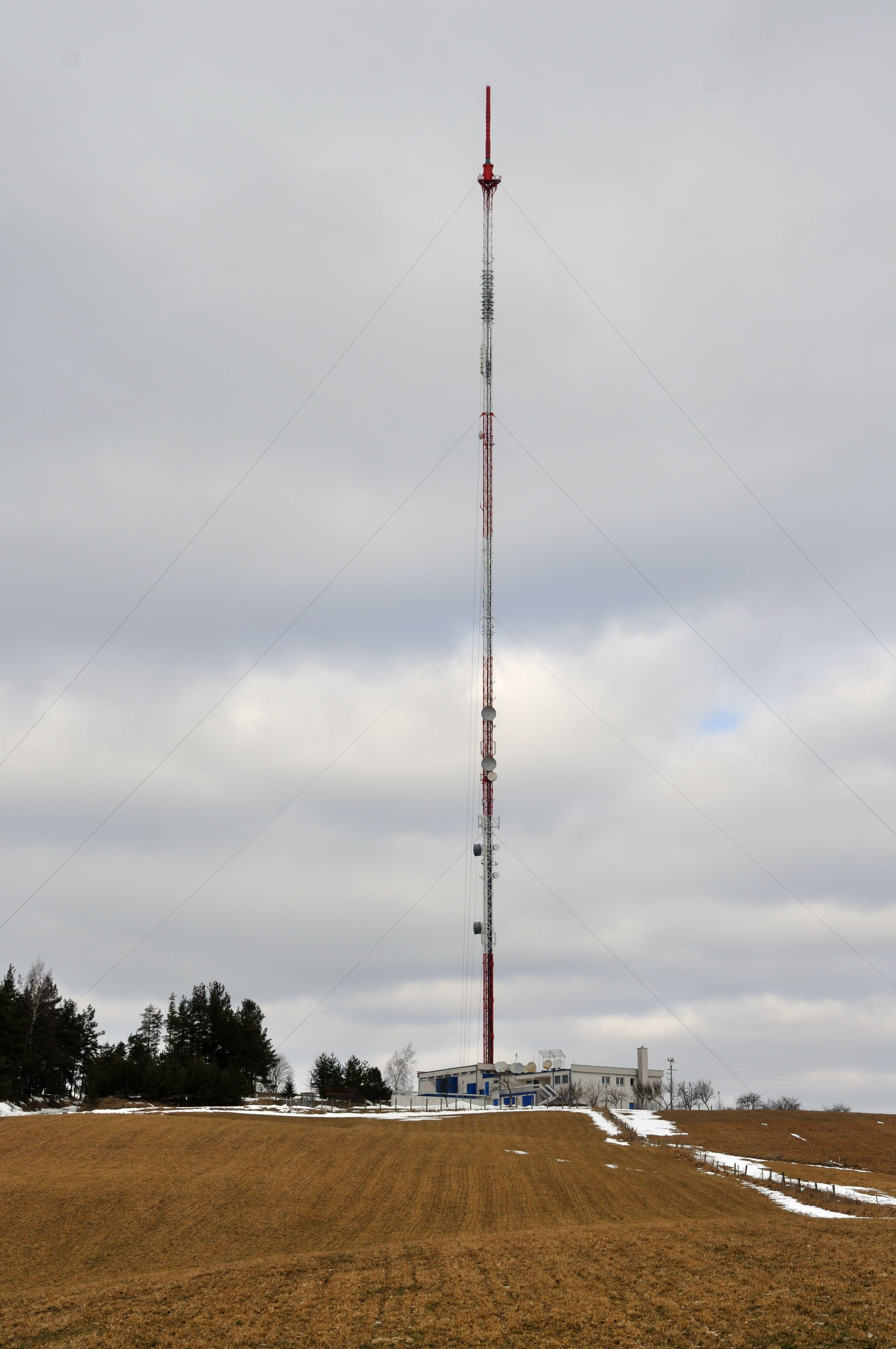
- RTCN Suwałki (Krzemianucha)

- Location within Poland

General information
- Status: Completed
- Type: TV-Mast
- Location: Jeleniewo, Podlaskie Voivodeship, Poland
- Coordinates: 54°11′45″N 22°52′30″E
- Owner: TP EmiTel

Height
- Height: 232 m (761 ft)

RTCN Suwałki (Krzemianucha) is a 232 m (761 ft) tall guyed mast for FM and TV situated at Jeleniewo near Suwałki in Podlaskie Voivodeship, Poland.

It is also known as Krzemianucha Transmitter or Transmitter Jeleniewo or Broadcasting Transmitting Centre at the Krzemianucha Hill (not to get mixed up over Krzemieniucha).

== Major Transmitters ==
The licensed transmitters at this location are:

Multiplex Number	Programme in Multiplex	Frequency	Channel	Power ERP	Polarisation	Antenna Diagram	Modulation
Multiplex 1	TVP1; Stopklatka TV; TVP ABC; TV Trwam; Eska TV; TTV; Polo TV; ATM Rozrywka	650 MHz	43	20 kW	Horizontal	ND	64 QAM
Multiplex 2	Polsat; TVN; TV4; TV Puls; TVN 7; Puls 2; TV6; Super Polsat	538 MHz	29	20 kW	Horizontal	ND	64 QAM
Multiplex 3	TVP1 HD; TVP2 HD; TVP Białystok; TVP Kultura; TVP Historia; TVP Polonia; TVP Rozrywka; TVP Info	770 MHz	58	20 kW	Horizontal	ND	64 QAM

Program	Frequency	Power ERP	Polarisation	Antenna Diagram
Polskie Radio Program IV	88,70 MHz	0,20 kW	Horizontal	ND
Polskie Radio Program II	92,00 MHz	30 kW	Horizontal	ND
RMF FM	95,10 MHz	1,60 kW	Horizontal	ND
Polskie Radio Program III	96,60 MHz	30 kW	Horizontal	ND
Polskie Radio Białystok	98,60 MHz	30 kW	Horizontal	ND
Radio ZET	101,40 MHz	30 kW	Horizontal	ND
Polskie Radio Program I	105,50 MHz	20 kW	Horizontal	ND
Radio Maryja	107,90 MHz	20 kW	Horizontal	ND

== See also ==
- List of masts
