= Trzeciewiec Transmitter =

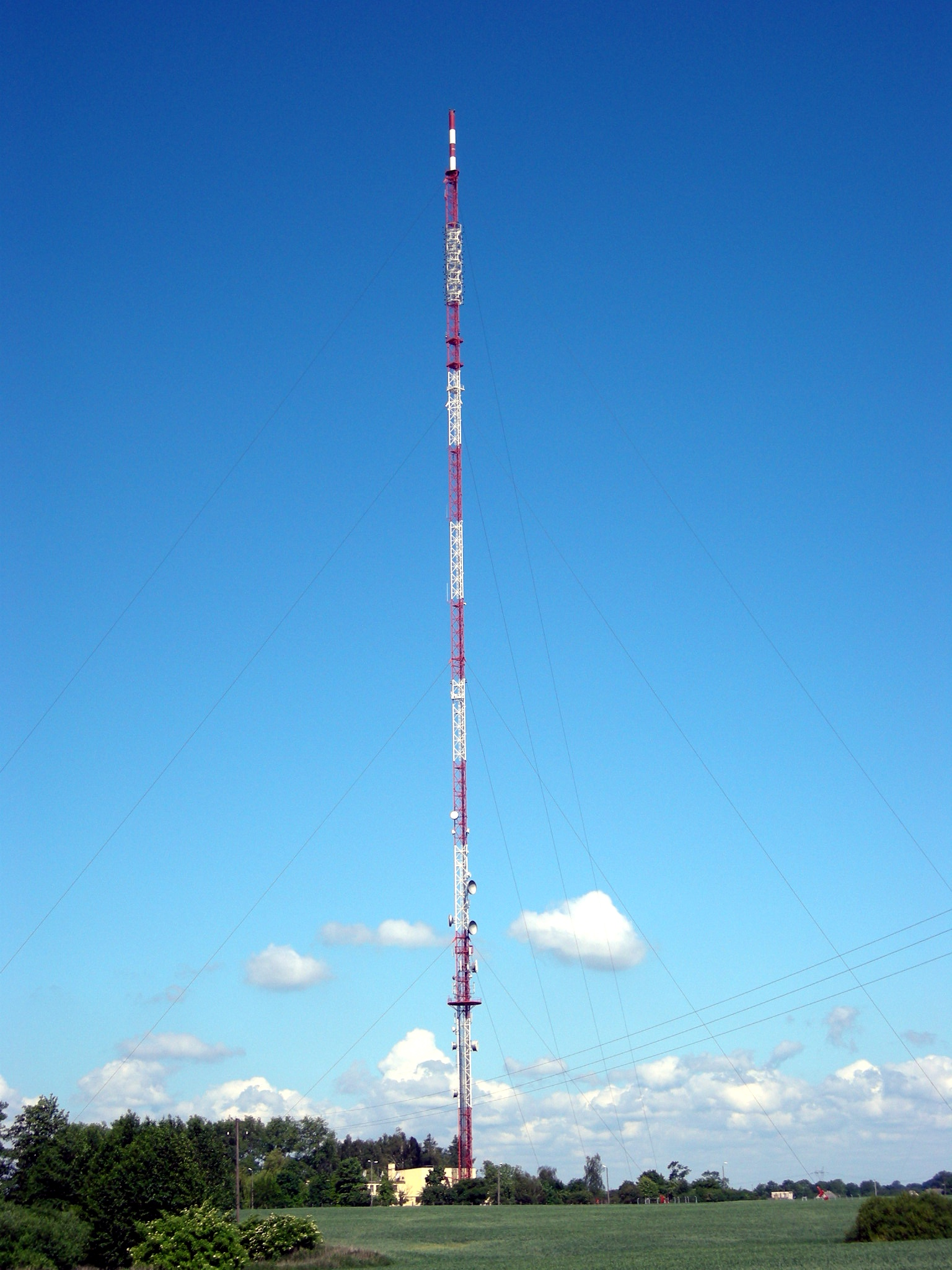
- Interactive map of the Trzeciewiec Transmitter area

General information
- Status: Completed
- Type: Guyed mast
- Location: Trzeciewiec
- Completed: 22 January 1962

Height
- Height: 320 m (1,049.87 ft)

RTCN Trzeciewiec
- Coordinates: 53°15′40″N 18°10′49″E

Trzeciewiec Transmitter (RTCN Trzeciewiec) - is a 320-metre-tall (1,050 ft) guyed steel mast, located in Trzeciewiec, Bydgoszcz County, Poland. It was built in 1962 to broadcast radio and television. It was used by the Kuyavian-Pomeranian Voivodeship.

== History ==
Residents of the Bydgoszcz Voivodeship established the tower. In 1957, a Social Committee was organized to build Pomerania Television Centre in Bydgoszcz. In 1958, the central management Board of the Radio station and Television in Warsaw approved the concept of the tower 20 kilometers from Bydgoszcz, in the vicinity of Trzeciewiec village. Construction began in 1960 and was finished in 1962. The transmitting apparatus was from the Czech company Tesla.

== Transmitted Programmes ==
=== FM Radio ===
Program	Frequency	ERP	Polarisation	Antenna diagram
RMF FM	93,30 MHz	120 kW	Horizontal	ND
Radio ZET	95,60 MHz	120 kW	Horizontal	ND
Polskie Radio Program II	97,60 MHz	120 kW	Horizontal	ND
Radio PiK	100,10 MHz	120 kW	Horizontal	ND
Polskie Radio Program III	102,10 MHz	120 kW	Horizontal	ND
Polskie Radio Program I	106,60 MHz	60 kW	Horizontal	ND

== Digital Television MPEG-4 ==
Multiplex Number	Programme in Multiplex	Frequency	Channel	Power ERP	Polarisation	Antenna Diagram	Modulation
MUX 1	Fokus TV; Stopklatka TV; TVP ABC; TV Trwam; 8TV; TTV; Polo TV; ATM Rozrywka	634 MHz	41	100 kW	Horizontal	ND	64 QAM
MUX 2	Polsat; TVN; TV4; TV Puls; TVN 7; Puls 2; TV6; Super Polsat	562 MHz	32	100 kW	Horizontal	ND	64 QAM
MUX 3	TVP1 HD; TVP2 HD; TVP3 Bydgoszcz; TVP Kultura; TVP Historia; TVP Rozrywka; TVP Info	594 MHz	36	100 kW	Horizontal	ND	64 QAM

== See also ==
- List of masts
