= FM- and TV-mast Olsztyn-Pieczewo =

FM and TV mast Olsztyn-Pieczewo
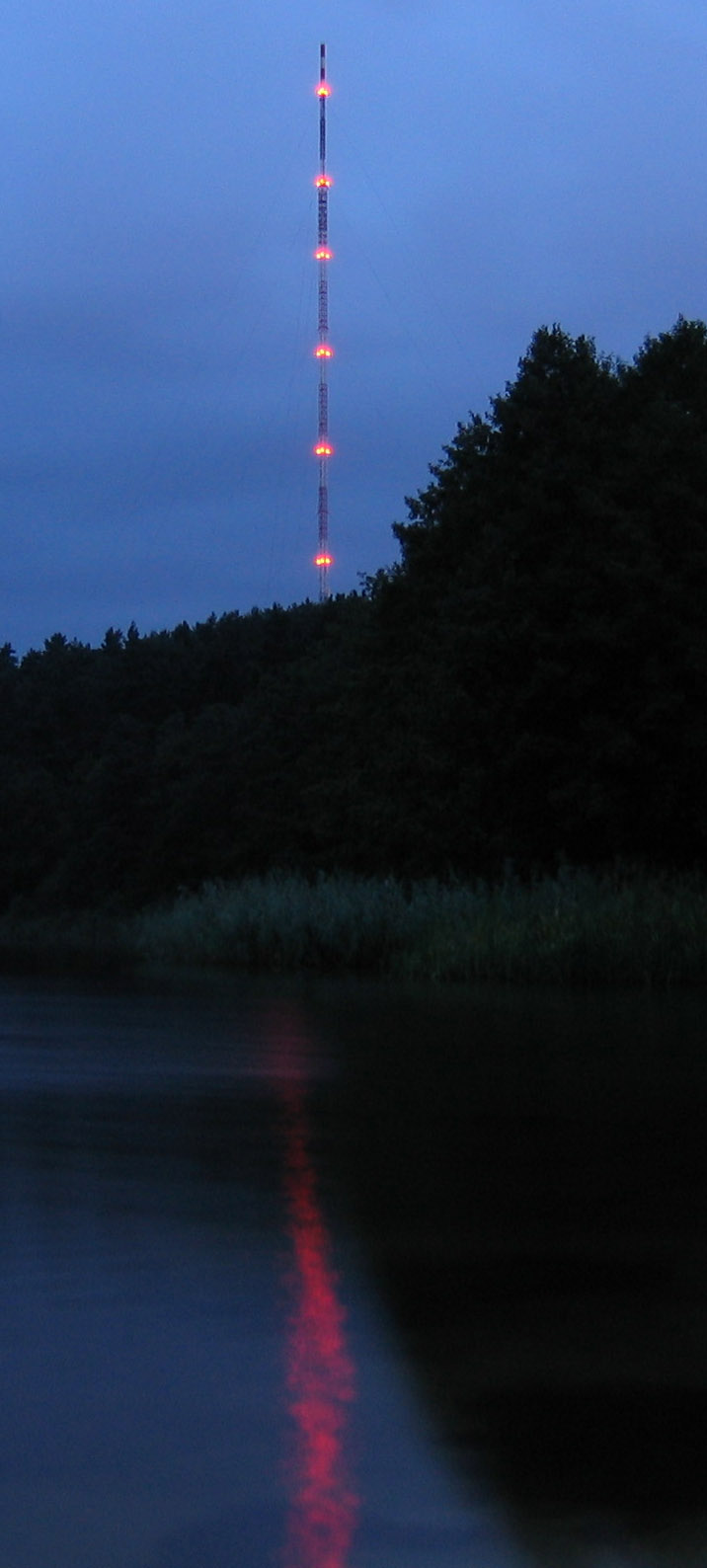
- FM- and TV-mast Olsztyn-Pieczewo, currently Poland's second tallest structure

- Location within Poland

General information
- Status: Completed
- Type: TV-Mast
- Location: Olsztyn, Poland
- Coordinates: 53°45′11.94″N 20°31′05.33″E
- Completed: 1969

Height
- Height: 385 m (1,263.12 ft)

Design and construction
- Main contractor: Polish Broadcasting Company

The FM- and TV-mast Olsztyn-Pieczewo (also known as Maszt RTCN Olsztyn-Pieczewo) is a 385-metre-tall (1,263 ft) guyed mast for FM and TV situated at Olsztyn-Pieczewo in Poland.

The FM- and TV-mast Olsztyn-Pieczewo, which was built in 1969, is since the collapse of the Warsaw radio mast, the second tallest structure in Poland. It is called in honor of Stefan Kamiński, the initiator of TV in Olsztyn "Stefan".

== Transmitted programmes ==
=== Digital Television MPEG-4 ===
Multiplex Number	Programme in Multiplex	Frequency	Channel	Power ERP	Polarisation	Antenna Diagram	Modulation
MUX 1	TVP1; Stopklatka TV; TVP ABC; TV Trwam; Eska TV; TTV; Polo TV; ATM Rozrywka	530 MHz	28	100 kW	Horizontal	ND	64 QAM
MUX 2	Polsat; TVN; TV4; TV Puls; TVN 7; Puls 2; TV6; Super Polsat	570 MHz	33	100 kW	Horizontal	ND	64 QAM
MUX 3	TVP1 HD; TVP2 HD; TVP Olsztyn; TVP Kultura; TVP Historia; TVP Sport; TVP Rozrywka; TVP Info	514 MHz	26	100 kW	Horizontal	ND	64 QAM
MUX 8	TVP Sport HD; TVP Rozrywka; Metro; WP; Zoom TV; Nowa TV	205.5 MHz	9	60 kW	Horizontal	ND	64 QAM

=== FM radio ===
Program	Frequency	Transmission Power
Radio Plus Olsztyn Archidiecezja Warmińska	88,10 MHz	0,50 kW
Radio ESKA Olsztyn Radio ESKA S.A.	89,90 MHz	0,50 kW
Radio ZET Gold Olsztyn Radio Warmia-Mazury WA-MA S.A.	90,50 MHz	0,40 kW
Chilli ZET "Radiostacja" Sp. z o.o.	91,90 MHz	0,50 kW
PR1 Polskie Radio S.A.	93 MHz	30 kW
PR2 Polskie Radio S.A.	93,70 MHz	2 kW
Vox FM Radio Eska Rock S.A.	94,70 MHz	0,50 kW
RMF FM Radio Muzyka Fakty Sp. z o.o.	95,30 MHz	60 kW
PR4 Polskie Radio S.A.	97,90 MHz	0,10 kW
PR3 Polskie Radio S.A.	99,10 MHz	120 kW
Radio Olsztyn Polskie Radio - Regionalna Rozgłośnia w Olsztynie "Radio Olsztyn" S.A.	103,20 MHz	120 kW
Radio ZET Radio ZET Sp. z o.o.	105,70 MHz	20 kW
Radio Maryja Prowincja Warszawska Zgromadzenia O.O. Redemptorystów	107,70 MHz	20 kW

== See also ==
- List of masts
