= Tatarska Góra TV Tower =

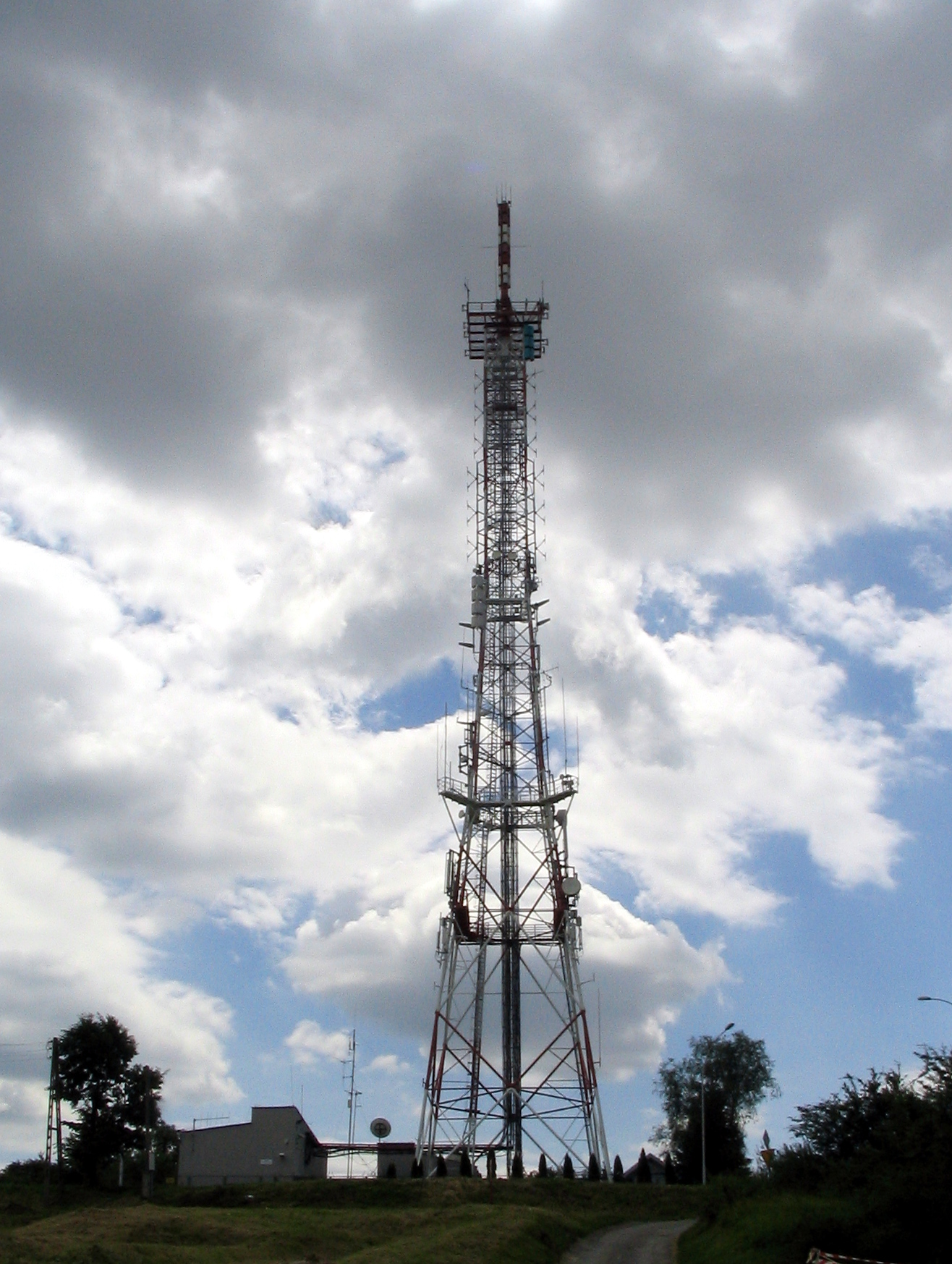
- Interactive map of the Tatarska Góra TV Tower area

General information
- Status: Completed
- Type: Tower

Height
- Height: 86 m (282.15 ft)

Tatarska Góra TV Tower
- Coordinates: 49°46′26″N 22°46′04″E
- Voivodeship: Subcarpathian Voivodeship
- County: Przemyśl County
- Gmina: Przemyśl

Tatarska Góra TV Tower is an 86-meter steel tower, situated at the Tartar Mound in the area of Przemyśl, Poland that was built in the 1930s.

== Transmitted programmes ==
=== FM radio ===
Program	Frequency	Power ERP	Polarisation	Antenna Diagram
Polskie Radio Program I	87,80 MHz	5 kW	Horizontal	ND
Polskie Radio 24 previously Polskie Radio Program IV	91,00 MHz	0,40 kW	Horizontal	ND
Polskie Radio Program II	94,10 MHz	1 kW	Horizontal	ND
Polskie Radio Program III	99,60 MHz	5 kW	Horizontal	ND
Polskie Radio Rzeszów	102,00 MHz	10 kW	Horizontal	ND
RMF FM	103,40 MHz	10 kW	Horizontal	ND
Radio Maryja	105,10 MHz	1 kW	Horizontal	ND
Radio ZET	107,90 MHz	10 kW	Horizontal	ND

=== Digital television MPEG-4 ===
Multiplex Number	Programme in Multiplex	Frequency	Channel	Power ERP	Polarisation	Antenna Diagram	Modulation	FEC
MUX 1	TVP1; Stopklatka TV; TVP ABC; TV Trwam; 8TV; TTV; Polo TV; ATM Rozrywka	650 MHz	43	20 kW	Horizontal	D	64 QAM	5/6
MUX 2	Polsat; TVN; TV4; TV Puls; TVN 7; Puls 2; TV6; Super Polsat	778 MHz	59	20 kW	Horizontal	D	64 QAM	3/4
MUX 3	TVP1 HD; TVP2 HD; TVP Rzeszów; TVP Kultura; TVP Historia; TVP Polonia; TVP Rozrywka; TVP Info	514 MHz	26	20 kW	Horizontal	D	64 QAM	5/6

== See also ==
- List of masts
