= TVP Nauka =

- Logo
- Country: Poland
- Headquarters: Warsaw

Programming
- Language: Polish
- Picture format: 16:9 HDTV

Ownership
- Owner: Telewizja Polska
- Sister channels: TVP1; TVP2; TVP HD; TVP ABC; Alfa TVP; TVP Historia; TVP Info; TVP Kobieta; TVP Kultura; TVP Dokument; TVP Parlament; TVP Polonia; TVP Rozrywka; TVP Seriale; TVP Sport; TVP World

History
- Launched: 3 October 2022

Links
- Website: nauka.tvp.pl

TVP Nauka is a Polish science television channel owned by TVP, which started broadcasting on 3 October 2022. The channel has an educational character.

== History ==
The channel logo was registered at the Polish Patent Office on 17 September 2021 and began its run as an internet platform on TVP's website the following month. Robert Szaj was appointed as channel director, due for a 2022 launch. The channel would air educational programs and documentaries with emphasis on the history of science and other scientific content.

On 12 August 2022, the channel started test broadcasts on the Night of the Perseids from the Truszczyny Astronomic Observatory.

Since 2024, TVP planned to close the channel and merge it, alongside TVP Historia and TVP Dokument into a new channel, TVP Wiedza, but this requires approval from the National Broadcasting Council.

== Programming ==
The channel airs programs related to popular science – either archived TVP programs (such as Sonda 2, Jak to działa?), as well as original productions for the channel, such as Jedzenie ma znaczenie, nauka na talerzu, Nauka jest wszędzie, Jasne jak słońce, Astronarium, Tajemnice operacji etc. It also airs other formats, such as the Giganci historii spin-off Giganci nauki and the current afafirs program Raport naukowy. In its first trimester on air, it also aired biographic movies on scientific figures and sci-if movies

== Availability ==
The channel is available on MUX 6 in Poland and also on pay television companies, on TVP GO and the TVP VOD app.
