= Szczecin-Kołowo Radio and Television Broadcasting Centre =

Transmitter Kołowo
- Coordinates: 53°20′03″N 14°40′37″E

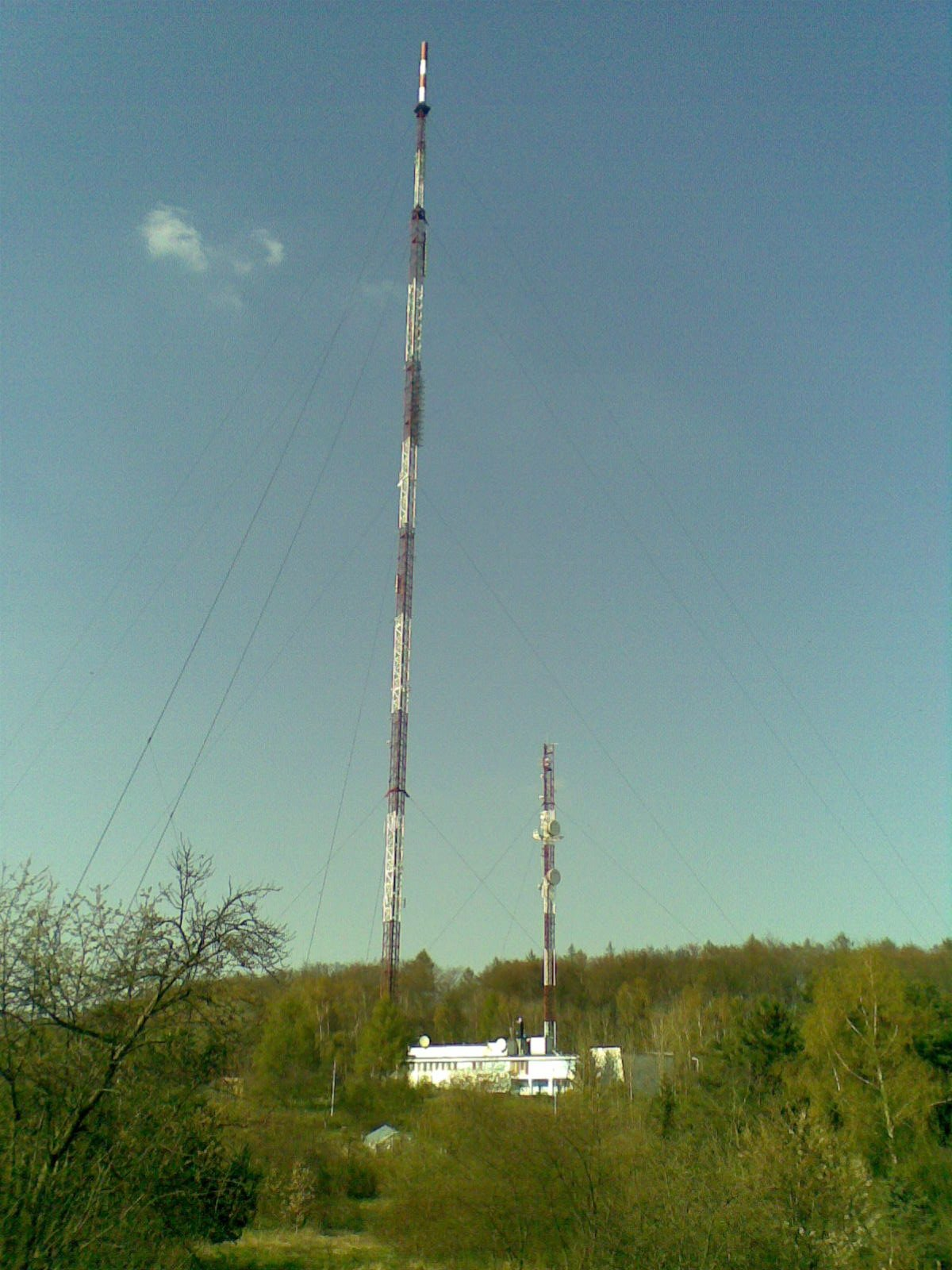
Transmitter Szczecin-Kolowo

Szczecin-Kołowo Radio and Television Broadcasting Centre is a transmission facility for FM and TV situated at Szczecin/Kołowo in Poland.

The antenna tower is a 267-metre-tall (876 ft) guyed mast. It is located at the highest point of a beech forest in Szczecin, and transmits several stations. It was built in 1963. It has two antenna masts, which are 267 and 70 metres tall and are visible several kilometres away and hence a well-known local landmark. In the 1930s, an observation tower was put up. In 1963 a 228-metre mast for TV broadcasting was erected. It was raised a further 25 metres to carry antennas for directional radio services. In 1985 a new mast with a height of 267 m was built. The old mast was shortened in 1989 to 61 metres. (source: Polish text)

== Transmitted programmes ==
=== Digital television MPEG-4 ===
Multiplex number	Programme in nultiplex	Frequency	Channel	Power ERP	Polarisation	Antenna diagram	Modulation
MUX 1	TVP1; Stopklatka TV; TVP ABC; TV Trwam; 8TV; TTV; Polo TV; ATM Rozrywka	634 MHz	41	100 kW	Horizontal	ND	64 QAM
MUX 2	Polsat; TVN; TV4; TV Puls; TVN 7; Puls 2; TV6; Super Polsat	578 MHz	34	100 kW	Horizontal	ND	64 QAM
MUX 3	TVP1 HD; TVP2 HD; TVP Szczecin; TVP Kultura; TVP Historia; TVP Polonia; TVP Rozrywka; TVP Info	690 MHz	48	100 kW	Horizontal	ND	64 QAM

=== FM radio ===
Program	Frequency	Polarization	Transmission Power
Radio Szczecin (regional public channel)	92 MHz	H	60 kW
Radio ZET	95,20 MHz	H	60 kW
Polish Radio 1	100,30 MHz	H	60 kW
Polish Radio 3	102,30 MHz	H	60 kW
RMF FM	106,70 MHz	H	60 kW

== See also ==
- List of masts
