= Żółwieniec Transmitter =

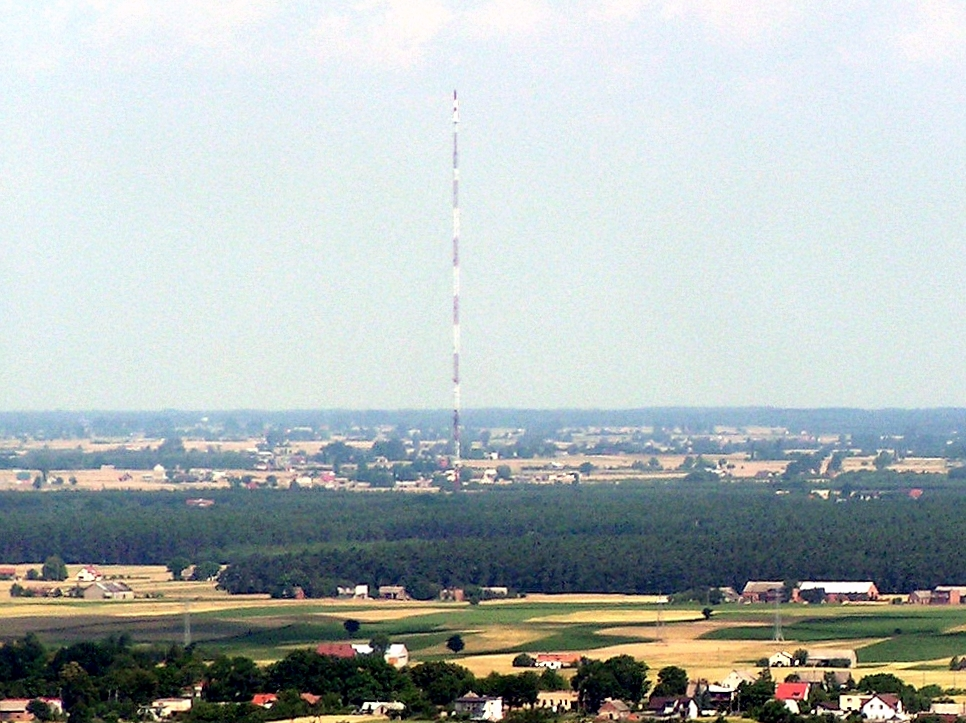
- Interactive map of the Żółwieniec Transmitter area

General information
- Status: Completed
- Type: Mast
- Location: Żółwieniec, Konin County, Ślesin, Poland
- Coordinates: 52°23′56″N 18°19′47″E
- Completed: 1992

Height
- Height: 320 m (1,049.87 ft)

Żółwieniec Transmitter (Radio Television Transmitting Centre Konin-Żółwieniec), is a guyed steel mast 320 m high, built in 1992. Put in the commune Ślesin in the Konin County, Greater Poland Voivodeship, in the vicinity of the north lakeside of Ślesin.

== Transmitted Programmes ==
=== Digital Television MPEG-4 ===
Multiplex Number	Programme in Multiplex	Frequency	Channel	Power ERP	Polarisation	Antenna Diagram	Modulation
MUX 1	TVP1; Stopklatka TV; TVP ABC; TV Trwam; Eska TV; TTV; Polo TV; ATM Rozrywka	746 MHz	55	100 kW	Horizontal	ND	64 QAM
MUX 2	Polsat; TVN; TV4; TV Puls; TVN 7; Puls 2; TV6; Super Polsat	666 MHz	45	100 kW	Horizontal	ND	64 QAM
MUX 3	TVP1 HD; TVP2 HD; TVP Poznań; TVP Kultura; TVP Historia; TVP Polonia; TVP Rozrywka; TVP Info	522 MHz	27	15 kW	Horizontal	D	64 QAM
MUX 3*(KP)	TVP1 HD; TVP2 HD; TVP Bydgoszcz; TVP Kultura; TVP Historia; TVP Polonia; TVP Rozrywka	594 MHz	36	40 kW	Horizontal	D	64 QAM

MUX 3*(KP) - Transmitters for Kuyavian-Pomeranian Voivodeship

=== Radio ===
Program	Frequency	Transmission Power	Polarisation	Direction
Polskie Radio Program I	87,70 MHz	30 kW	H	ND
Polskie Radio "Merkury" Poznań	91,90 MHz	30 kW	H	ND
RMF FM	98,90 MHz	30 kW	H	ND
Polskie Radio Program III	103,30 MHz	30 kW	H	ND
Radio Maryja	105,10 MHz	30 kW	H	ND
Radio ZET	107,10 MHz	30 kW	H	ND
