= TVP Kobieta =

Television channel in Poland

- Logo
- Country: Poland

Programming
- Picture format: 16:9 576i (SDTV); 1080i (HDTV)

Ownership
- Owner: Telewizja Polska
- Sister channels: TVP1; TVP2; TVP HD; TVP ABC; Alfa TVP; TVP Dokument; TVP Historia; TVP Info; TVP Seriale; TVP Nauka; TVP Parlament; TVP Polonia; TVP Rozrywka; TVP Kultura; TVP Sport; TVP World

History
- Launched: 8 March 2011

TVP Kobieta is a Polish women's lifestyle television channel owned by TVP. Launched on 8 March 2021 (International Women's Day), its director is Iwona Bocian-Zaciewska.

== History ==
The creation of TVP Kobiet was announced by TVP president Jacek Kurski at the National Media Council on 7 August 2020. On 12 January 2021, its creation was included in the updated charter given by the corporation's president to the National Broadcasting Council.

Broadcasts began on 8 March 2021 at 5:30am, replacing TVP Rozrywka on MUX-8.

On 1 June 2023, it became available for free on the TVP VOD app.

== Programming ==
At launch, the channel provided afternoon repeats of TVP2's morning show Pytanie na śniadanie. It also offered biographic and documentary films, as well as series (such as Velvet). Part of the schedule consists of repeats of content already seen on the main channels.

For spring 2021, it acquired British series Dom w słońcu (A Place in the Sun), a lifestyle program on British people finding a home abroad. On 6 May 2021, it started repeating M jak miłość from the first episode.

On 13 January 2023, the channel was removed from MUX-8 as part of TVP not renweing its contract with the multiplex operator and following the move to MUX-6 in the DVB-T2 standard.
