= Alfa TVP =

- Country: Poland

Programming
- Picture format: 16:9 1080i (HDTV)

Ownership
- Owner: Telewizja Polska
- Sister channels: TVP1; TVP2; TVP HD; TVP ABC; TVP Dokument; TVP Historia; TVP Info; TVP Kobieta; TVP Kultura; TVP Nauka; TVP Parlament; TVP Polonia; TVP Rozrywka; TVP Seriale; TVP Sport; TVP World

History
- Launched: 20 December 2022

Links
- Website: Official Webpage

Availability

Terrestrial
- Polish Digital: Channel 28 (HD)

Alfa TVP is a Polish free-to-air television channel offered by Telewizja Polska. The programming is aimed at youth aged 10-16.

== History ==
Initially, the channel was to be named TVP Teen (later TeenTV)). The name Alfa TVP was ultimately selected, referencing the Generation Alpha cohort, which was born after 2010.

The channel's target audience is viewers between the ages of 10 and 16, a little older than the demographic catered by TVP ABC. It started broadcasts on December 20, 2022. Its launch schedule included mainly animated and live-action series for children and teenagers and science programs taken from TVP's archives. The first program on air was the British series Almost Never.

Its first original production was Tylko nie piątek!, a teen sitcom directed by Tomasz Szafrański.

== Availability ==
In its early months, the channel was exclusively online, on the TVP Stream and TVP GO platforms. In January 2023, it started broadcasting on digital terrestrial television (on MUX 6), and in May on local cable operators (about 80). On June 1, 2023, it offered its content on TVP VOD. In March 2024, the channel became available on the larger platforms (such as Canal+ and Orange TV).
