= Television in Poland =

Television in Poland was introduced on an experimental basis in 1937. It was state owned, and was interrupted by the Second World War in 1939. Television returned to Poland in 1952 and for several decades was controlled by the communist government. Colour television was introduced in Poland in 1971. Private television stations in Poland appeared around the time of the fall of communism, with PTV Echo (once a member of the local channels of Polonia 1) becoming the first private station in Poland (and in the former Eastern Bloc).

== History ==
During the Communist era, Polish state television aired many programs from both the West and the rest of the Eastern Bloc. Poles requested more photos of the Bonanza cast than even Americans, and The Forsyte Saga was very popular. The most popular domestic dramas often depicted Poland in World War II. From 1971 Citizen's Forum, a call-in show, subjected government ministers to public questions.

== Terrestrial ==
Terrestrial television in Poland broadcasts using a digital DVB-T system. First test DVB-T emission was carried out in Warsaw on 9 November 2001. In April 2004, first DVB-T transmitter near Rzeszów started operation and local TVP division started to market set-top boxes allowing to receive it. As of July 2016, there are about 250 DVB-T transmitters operating in Poland, broadcasting up to three multiplexes (except local stations), all using MPEG-4 AVC compression. Majority of channels are available in HD across all the Poland after DVB-T2/HEVC switchover has finished in June 2022, while channels from MUX8 (Metro, Zoom TV, Nowa TV, WP, ViDoc TV, Republika and wPolsce24) are available only in SD, although Nowa TV and Republika broadcast in HD in some local multiplexes. Analog terrestrial transmissions were terminated in 2013. First efforts to introduce DVB-T in Poland was made in 1997 in Gdańsk on initiative of TVP (Polish public television broadcaster). In the spring of 2022, the terrestrial TV broadcasting standard was changed across the country to the newer and more effective DVB-T2/HEVC standard, where HEVC (or H.265) is a new standard for TV signal compression. Switching to the new DVB-T2/HEVC terrestrial TV broadcasting standard was carried out in the period from March to June 2022. However, the changes did not cover MUX3, which belongs as a whole to TVP. Decision by Urząd Komunikacji Elektronicznej requested by the Minister of Interior Affairs and Administration, argumented by the Russian invasion of Ukraine, allowed to delay the switch until the end of 2023.

=== Allocation ===
At 2006 conference in Geneva known as GE06 Poland received eight DVB-T multiplexes—seven at UHF frequencies 470–862 MHz (channels 21–69) and one at VHF frequency 174–230 MHz (channels 6–12). Since some of these frequencies are currently used for analog PAL terrestrial television broadcasting, it is possible to run only two nationwide multiplexes (MUX1, MUX2) and one (MUX3) which covers part of country (58% of population). Introduction of all multiplexes will be possible after switching off analog broadcasting.

A government document entitled "Country digitalization schedule", dated January 2009, set out plan for the digital broadcast switch-on to be made in three steps and analog broadcast switch-off in six steps.

First regular digital broadcast started on 30 September 2010. Analog broadcast switch-off started on 7 November 2012 and the transition to digital broadcasting finished on 23 July 2013.

The period of time between digital broadcast switch-on and analog broadcast switch-off will allow people time to buy new integrated Digital TVs or set-top boxes.

=== Current status ===
- MUX1 covers 98.8% of population;
- MUX2 covers more than 98.8% of population;
- MUX3 covers 99.5% of population;
- MUX6 covers more than 90% of population;
- MUX8 covers 97.4% of population.

=== Analog shutdown ===
The shutdown of analog broadcast took place in 7 steps between 7 November 2012 and 23 July 2013.

Operators of cable TV don't provide analog service in their networks any more, Vectra and Toya stopped in 2022, UPC stopped in 2023 in most cities of Poland and in January 2024 in Warsaw and Inea stopped in March 2024.

=== Additional government actions ===
The Polish government created Informative campaigns regarding analog broadcast switch-off in mass media. The government also requires electronic equipment sellers to inform buyers that MPEG-2 TVs and STBs are not compatible with the national standard which is currently DVB-T2 HEVC QAM256 .

The Polish government provides financial help for poor families and seniors to buy a TV - 250 PLN or STB – 100 PLN per household, totaling 475 million PLN.

=== Technical information ===
Polish digital terrestrial television broadcast uses the basic parameters of a digital receiver defined in ETSI TS 101 154 for level 4.1 HDTV: 50 Hz HEVC HDTV 8-bit (resolutions 1920 x 1080 p50, 1280 x 720 p50) MPEG-2 Audio Layer 2 and E-AC -3 audios. In the case of a TV receiver capable of displaying UHD, the DVB-T2 receiver also supports the format specified in ETSI TS 101 154 in point 5.14 HEVC HDR UHDTV IRD using HLG10 and HEVC HDR UHDTV IRD using PQ10, Main 10 Profile, Main Tier for UHDTV with resolution 3840 x 2160 and AC-4 audio.

=== Assignment of channels in multiplexes ===
Plan from January 2009 included three nationwide multiplexes with seven SDTV channels in each:

- MUX1 – Free-to-air commercial channels (Polsat, TVN, TV4, TV Puls); after analog broadcast switch-off MUX3 covered the entire country population and public channels moved to it; there was competition for three freed channels;
- MUX2 – open competition
- MUX3 – Public channels; after analog switch-off MUX3 will cover all country population and public channels will be moved to it from MUX1; there will be competition for three freed channels in MUX1.

In January 2010 new plan on introducing DVB-T was presented. Assignment of multiplexes was changed:

- MUX1 – public broadcaster channels (including TVP1, TVP2 and TVP Info)
- MUX2 – Commercial free-to-air channels (Polsat, TVN, TV4, TV Puls) plus one additional from each broadcaster.

In June 2010 the final decision on the allocation of multiplexes was made:

- MUX1 – four channels chosen in open competition (were selected: ATM Rozrywka, TTV, Eska TV and Polo TV) and temporary three public broadcaster channels (TVP1, TVP2, TVP Info); after analog broadcast switch-off (on July 23, 2013) and after covering MUX3 all country population, public channels have been deleted from MUX1; there was a contest for the remaining four freed channels (were selected: TV Trwam, TVP ABC, Stopklatka TV and Fokus TV);
- MUX2 – four current terrestrial analog commercial free-to-air channels (Polsat, TVN, TV4, TV Puls) plus one additional from each broadcaster, currently: Super Polsat (previously Polsat Sport News), TVN7, TV6 and Puls 2;
- MUX3 – public broadcaster channels (currently six: TVP1, TVP2, TVP3, TVP Info, TVP Kultura, TVP Historia, TVP Sport – earlier TVP Rozrywka).

=== MUX1 ===
MUX1
Channel	Owner	Type	Position (LCN)
Eska TV	Polsat Plus Group (earlier ZPR Media Group)	Music/Entertainment	12
TTV	Stavka (TVN Warner Bros. Discovery)	General/Social-intervention	13
Polo TV	Polsat Plus Group (earlier ZPR Media Group)	Music/Entertainment	14
Antena HD	MWE Networks	General	15
TV Trwam	Lux Veritatis Foundation	Religious	16
Stopklatka TV	Canal+ Polska	Movies	17
Fokus TV	Polsat Plus Group (earlier ZPR Media Group)	General/Documentaries	18
Wydarzenia 24	Polsat Plus Group	News	49

=== MUX2 ===
MUX2
Channel	Owner	Type	Position (LCN)
Polsat	Polsat Plus Group	General	4
TVN	TVN Warner Bros. Discovery	General	5
TV4	Polsat Plus Group (earlier Polskie Media)	General	6
TV Puls	Telewizja Puls	General	7
TVN7	TVN Warner Bros. Discovery	General/Entertainment	8
Puls 2	Telewizja Puls	General/Entertainment	9
TV6	Polsat Plus Group (earlier Polskie Media)	General/Entertainment	10
Super Polsat	Polsat Plus Group	General/Entertainment	11

=== MUX3 ===
MUX3
Channel	Owner	Type	Position (LCN)
TVP1	Telewizja Polska	General	1
TVP2	Telewizja Polska	General	2
TVP3	Telewizja Polska	Regional	3
TVP ABC	Telewizja Polska	Children	29
TVP Kultura	Telewizja Polska	Culture	30
TVP Historia	Telewizja Polska	Historical	31
TVP Sport	Telewizja Polska	Sport	32
TVP Info	Telewizja Polska	News	34
TVP GO	Telewizja Polska	Interactive (HbbTV)	88
TVP World	Telewizja Polska	International (HbbTV)	91
TVP ABC 2	Telewizja Polska	Children (HbbTV)	92
TVP Historia 2	Telewizja Polska	Historical (HbbTV)	93
TVP Kultura 2	Telewizja Polska	Cultural (HbbTV)	94

=== MUX6 ===
MUX6
Channel	Owner	Type	Position (LCN)
TVP Polonia	Telewizja Polska	Worldwide	19
TVP Nauka	Telewizja Polska	Popular science	20
TVP Dokument	Telewizja Polska	Documentaries	24
TVP Rozrywka	Telewizja Polska	Entertainment	27
Alfa TVP	Telewizja Polska	Children	28
TVP World	Telewizja Polska	International	33
TVP Kobieta	Telewizja Polska	Lifestyle	35
Belsat	Telewizja Polska	General	36

=== MUX8 (DVB-T, MPEG-4) ===
MUX8
Channel	Owner	Type	Position (LCN)
Nowa TV	Polsat Plus Group (earlier ZPR Media Group)	General	40
WP	Wirtualna Polska Holding	General/Interactive	41
Republika	Telewizja Republika	News	51
wPolsce24	Fratria	News	52
CDA Premium	CDA SA	Interactive (HbbTV)	86
Sklep Kapitan.pl	CDA SA	Online shop (HbbTV)	87
test 95	Emitel	N/A (black screen) (HbbTV)	95
test 96	Emitel	N/A (black screen) (HbbTV)	96
test 97	Emitel	N/A (black screen) (HbbTV)	97
EmiRadio	Emitel	Interactive (HbbTV)	98
EmiTV	Emitel	Interactive (HbbTV)	99
test 211	Emitel	N/A (black screen) (HbbTV)	211
test 212	Emitel	N/A (black screen) (HbbTV)	212
test 213	Emitel	N/A (black screen) (HbbTV)	213
test 214	Emitel	N/A (black screen) (HbbTV)	214
test 215	Emitel	N/A (black screen) (HbbTV)	215

=== MUX4 Polsat Box "Sport i informacje" ("Sports & information" Pay TV package) ===
Polsat Box "Sport i informacje" ("Sports & information" Pay TV package)
Channel	Owner	Type	Position (LCN)
Polsat Sport 1	Polsat Plus Group	Sport	110
Polsat Sport 2	Polsat Plus Group	Sport	111
Eurosport 1	TVN Warner Bros. Discovery	Sport	112
Eurosport 2	TVN Warner Bros. Discovery	Sport	113
Eleven Sports 1	Polsat Plus Group	Sport	114
Eleven Sports 2	Polsat Plus Group	Sport	115
TVN Turbo	TVN Warner Bros. Discovery	Lifestyle	116
TVN Style	TVN Warner Bros. Discovery	Lifestyle	117
Polsat News Polityka	Polsat Plus Group	News	118
Polsat News	Polsat Plus Group	News	119
TVN24	TVN Warner Bros. Discovery	News	120
Polsat promo HbbTV	Polsat Plus Group	Interactive (HbbTV)	333

=== MUX-L1 (Lubań/Jelenia Góra/Bolesławiec/Chojnów) ===
MUX-L1
Channel	Owner	Type
Junior Channel	MWE Networks	Children
Home TV	MWE Networks	Lifestyle
TVC Super	MWE Networks	General
Filmax HD	MWE Networks	Movies
Pogoda24.TV	MWE Networks	News
TV Okazje	TVO (Polsat Plus Group)	Teleshopping
TVC	MWE Networks	General
Echo24 HD	MWE Networks	Regional
Stars.TV	JBD S.A.	Music
TV Dami / TV Bolesławiec	N/A	Regional
TVT Zgorzelec	Telewizja Regionalna TVT	Regional
Power TV	MWE Networks	Music
TVS	TVS Sp. z.o.o.	Regional

=== MUX-L2 (Ornontowice/Rybnik) ===
MUX-L2
Channel	Owner	Type
TVT	Telewizja TVT Sp. z o.o.	Regional
Republika	Telewizja Republika	News
Stars.TV	JBD S.A.	Music
Nowa TV	Polsat Group	General
Dolce Vita TV	Dolce Vita TV Sp. z o. o.	Lifestyle
TV Okazje SD	TVO (Polsat Plus Group)	Teleshopping

=== MUX-L3 (Częstochowa/Kamieńsk/Tomaszów Mazowiecki) ===
MUX-L3
Channel	Owner	Type
Junior Channel	MWE Networks	Children
Home TV	MWE Networks	Lifestyle
TVC	MWE Networks	General
TVC Super	MWE Networks	General
Pogoda24.TV	MWE Networks	News
TV Okazje	TVO (Polsat Plus Group)	Teleshopping
Filmax	MWE Networks	Movies
Stars.TV	JBD S.A.	Music
Power TV	MWE Networks	Music
TVS	TVS Sp. z.o.o.	Regional

=== MUX-L4 (Świdnica/Wrocław) (DVB-T, MPEG-4) ===
MUX-L4
Channel	Owner	Type
Junior Channel	MWE Networks	Children
Home TV	MWE Networks	Lifestyle
TVC Super	MWE Networks	General
Filmax	MWE Networks	Movies
Pogoda24.TV	MWE Networks	News
Polsat HD	Polsat Plus Group	General
TV Okazje	TVO (Polsat Plus Group)	Teleshopping
Stars.TV	JBD S.A.	Music
Echo24 HD	MWE Networks	Regional
Power TV	MWE Networks	Music
TVS	TVS Sp. z.o.o.	Regional

=== MUX-L7 (Lubin/Głogów) (DVB-T, MPEG-4) ===
MUX-L7
Channel	Owner	Type
TV Regionalna SD	TVL Sp. z o.o. (programme producer); GIA DINH Foundation (concessionaire)	Regional
Nowa TV	Polsat Plus Group	General
Republika	Telewizja Republika	General
EWTN	Eternal World Television Network Inc.	Religious
TV Okazje	TVO (Polsat Plus Group)	Teleshopping
Polsat	Polsat Plus Group	General

=== LRT local multiplex (Suwałki) (DVB-T, MPEG-4) ===
LRT local MUX
Channel	Owner	Type
LRT Lituanica SD	LRT	General

== Satellite ==
The first Polish analog TV station broadcast via satellite was TV Polonia (later rebranded as TVP Polonia. Its test transmission started on 24th October 1992, followed by regular transmission starting on 31st March 1993. By 2005, it switched to digital broadcast.

The first commercial Polish channel on satellite was Polsat, initially broadcasting from the Netherlands. It debuted on 5th December 1992.

On 2nd December 1994, Canal+ S.A. launched a test transmission of the Canal+ channel, broadcasting from Paris. The following year, Canal+ was fully launched in Poland on 21st March and became the first premium channel in country. On 3rd July, another premium channel, FilmNet, debuted in Polish. It was the only channel out of seven of MultiChoice Kaleidoscope, a short-lived pre-paid satellite offering, with Polish audio (alongside Discovery Channel Europe with Polish subtitles). Due to low ratings, it merged with Canal+ on 28th February 1997.

HBO Poland started test airing on 12th July 1996 from Germany and regular transmission on 17th September of the same year.

The first digital satellite provider was Wizja TV. Initially, Wizja was planned to be a part of a joint platform with Canal+ named Wizja+ but these plans failed. Wizja TV started tests on 5th June 1998 and officially debuted on 18th September. It included two channels in English (CNN International and MTV Europe) and sixteen in Polish: Wizja Jeden, Twoja Wizja, Wizja Pogoda, National Geographic Channel, Discovery Channel Poland, Travel Channel, QuesTV, Animal Planet, Fox Kids, Cartoon Network, TCM, HBO Poland, Hallmark, Romantica, Atomic TV and BET on Jazz. More channels were added later, including Polsat and TVN. Notably, TVP channels weren't available.

Canal+, without its potential partner, created Cyfra+ platform. Its tests started on 21st October 1998. The official debut happened on 16th November that year. It was the first satellite provider of terrestrial channels: TVP1, TVP2, Polsat and TVN. Eventually, Wizja TV and Cyfra+ merged on 1st March 2002 to create Nowa Cyfra+ (New Cyfra+).

December 1999 saw the introduction of another platform, Polsat 2 Cyfrowy (later renamed to Polsat Cyfrowy, Cyfrowy Polsat and finally Polsat Box), owned by Polsat. By 2008, it became the biggest satellite platform in Poland.

On 12 October 2006, ITI launched the n platform with a few HD channels available, as well as—also new to Poland—video on demand functionality. Later, in December 2006, Cyfra+ also started HD broadcasts. Cyfrowy Polsat started HD broadcasts in second half of 2007.

On 3 October 2008, n pre-paid television channels to you and Dom ITI, to new Telewizja na kartę.

On 27 October 2008, Telekomunikacja Polska launched the Orange platform with a few HD channels available, as well as—also new to Poland—video on demand.

On 16 May 2011, the Cyfra+, n, Orange, Cyfrowy Polsat, and Telewizja na kartę platforms introduced 3D broadcasts (requiring 3D glasses) and channels aired in that format to their lineups.

On 21 March 2013, as part of deeper cooperation between Canal+ Group and ITI, Cyfra+ and n were merged into nc+.

On 3 September 2019 nc+ has changed name to Platforma Canal+.

On 5 August 2024, the Canal+, Orange, and Polsat Box platforms introduced 4K Ultra HD broadcasts and channels aired in that standard to their offerings.

== Other technologies ==
Several TV channels, as well as video on demand, are available in Polish mobile telephony networks. There are no currently operating dedicated mobile TV transmitters.

There are also OTT TV service providers.

== Digital platforms in Poland ==
Name	Type	Subscribers	Number of channels	HD channels	3D channel	VOD
Polsat Box	Digital platform	5,700,000	0	0	0	Polsat Box Go; Max; PPV/VOD; Disney+
Canal+	Digital platform	2,119,000	175	92	0	Canal+ Online; TVP Prapiemiery; Canal+ VOD; Seriale+; TVN Player; Baby TV OD; Poznaj nc+; Smaczki OD; Sport+
Orange TV	Digital platform	875,000	99	40	0	Seriale+; Wideo na życzenie; Prapremiery TVP; PictureBox; TV na życzenie; Telewizja Tu i Tam
UPC Polska	Cable	1,434,600	201	50	0	Premiery; Hity; HD; TVP na żądanie; TVN na żądanie; Filmbox On Demand; Disney Channel na żądanie; Cartoon Network na żądanie; HBO OD; National Geographic na żądanie; Xotix; Discovery On Demand; Sundance na żądanie; Canal+ na żądanie
Vectra	Cable	970,933	204	52	0	BBC na żądanie; HBO On Demand; Discovery On Demand; Disney Channel na żądanie; HBO GO; GO ON
Multimedia Polska	Cable	825,000	171	41	0	PictureBox; Kino Świat; HBO On Demand; HBO GO; MmTV
Inea	Cable	182,000	190	52	0	Canal+ na życzenie; Ale Kino+ na życzenie; HBO On Demand; Planete+ na życzenie; TeleToon+ na życzenie; Duck TV na życzenie; Kuchnia+ na życzenie; Domo+ na życzenie; HBO GO; Karaoke TV
TOYA	Cable	160,000		52	0	Przedpremiery TVP; Fyre TV; TVP na żądanie; Canal+ na życzenie; Ale Kino+ na życzenie; HBO On Demand; Sundance Channel na żądanie; Romance TV na życzenie; Planete+ na życzenie; Discovery On Demand; Animal Planet On Demand; History na życzenie; TV3 Polska; Polsat JimJam na życzenie; Duck TV na życzenie; Kuchnia+ na życzenie; Domo+ na życzenie; TLC On Demand; English Club TV On Demand; TV Toya na życzenie; Catch UP TVP; TV Toya Catch Up; Player; ipla; iplex; VOD TVP; TVP Parlament; HBO GO; NatGeo Play; Karaoke TV; GO ON; RMFon.pl; Eska GO
Petrus	Cable	50,000		55	0	✗
Promax	Cable	35,670		41	0	HBO GO
Sat Film	Cable	25,000		41	0	HBO GO
Other Cable	Cable	more than 1,322,000				

== Television rating system in Poland ==
No age restrictions	for minors above 7 years old	for minors above 12 years old	for minors above 16 years old	only for viewers above 18 years old

== Viewing shares ==
Top 20 Polish TV channels by Nielsen Media Research (channels marked with †, which were in a given year out of the Top 20):

Channels	Launched	2023	2022	2021	2020	2019	2018	2017	2016	2015	2014	2013	2012	2011	2010
TVP1	01/1953	7.73	8.67	9.73	9.66	9.68	9.73	9.59	11.10	12.28	12.27	13.17	15.41	17.41	19.35
TVP2	10/1970	7.33	7.02	7.85	8.34	7.85	8.16	7.87	8.32	8.72	9.41	10.30	12.56	13.27	14.49
Polsat	12/1992	6.91	7.30	8.19	8.37	9.85	10.23	10.91	11.45	11.60	11.84	12.24	13.97	14.53	
TVN	10/1997	6.85	6.90	7.49	8.45	7.37	9.38	9.87	10.37	10.65	11.68	12.54	13.93	14.95	15.21
TVN24	08/2001	5.72	5.63	4.94	5.36	4.47	4.14	4.27	3.81	3.22	2.99	3.12	3.06	3.14	3.45
TVP Info	10/2007	5.08	5.14	3.97	5.14	4.82	3.43	3.83	3.26	3.51	2.86	2.61	3.82	4.24	4.92
TV4	04/2000	2.98	2.89	3.23	3.64	3.72	4.16	4.08	3.36	3.27	2.68	2.97	2.49	2.39	2.14
TVN7	03/2002	3.16	3.07	3.60	3.45	3.21	3.24	3.29	3.30	3.53	3.54	2.53	1.79	1.63	
TV Puls	03/2001	2.95	2.90	3.59	3.61	3.50	3.40	3.03	3.20	3.09	3.11	3.08	2.33	1.89	1.51
TTV	01/2012	1.73	1.76	2.07	1.16	2.24	2.14	1.78	1.60	1.45	1.30	1.02	† 0.31	—	—
Puls 2	07/2012	1.59	1.43	1.68	1.99	1.91	1.88	1.75	1.78	1.62	1.52	1.07	† 0.14	—	—
TVP Seriale	12/2010	1.56	1.58	1.47	1.47	1.41	1.41	1.49	1.48	1.40	1.44	1.14	0.64	† 0.34	—
Polsat 2	03/1997	1.34	1.35	1.45	1.47	1.54	1.52	1.47	1.52	1.45	1.68	1.79	1.37	1.32	0.88
TV6	05/2011	1.15	1.08	1.32	1.56	1.71	1.45	1.44	1.48	1.23	0.97	† 0.61	† 0.20	† 0.04	—
TVP ABC	02/2014	† —	† —	† —	1.02	1.23	1.39	1.18	0.92	† 0.70	† 0.49	—	—	—	—
Polsat News	06/2008	1.76	1.97	1.76	2.03	1.13	1.12	1.14	1.11	1.08	1.08	1.04	0.90	0.81	0.62
TVP Rozrywka	04/2013	† —	† —	† —	0.50	0.49	0.46 (August)	0.99	1.09	1.14	0.93	† 0.48	—	—	—
Stopklatka TV	03/2014	1.14	1.12	1.30	1.17	1.12	0.98	0.94	1.00	0.88	† 0.60	—	—	—	—
TVP3	09/2013	0.97	0.91	1.00	1.10	1.02	0.98	0.94	0.97	1.05	1.09	† 0.36	—	—	—
Fokus TV	04/2014	0.83	1.07	1.26	1.14	0.93	0.96	0.80	† 0.81	† 0.69	† 0.31	—	—	—	—

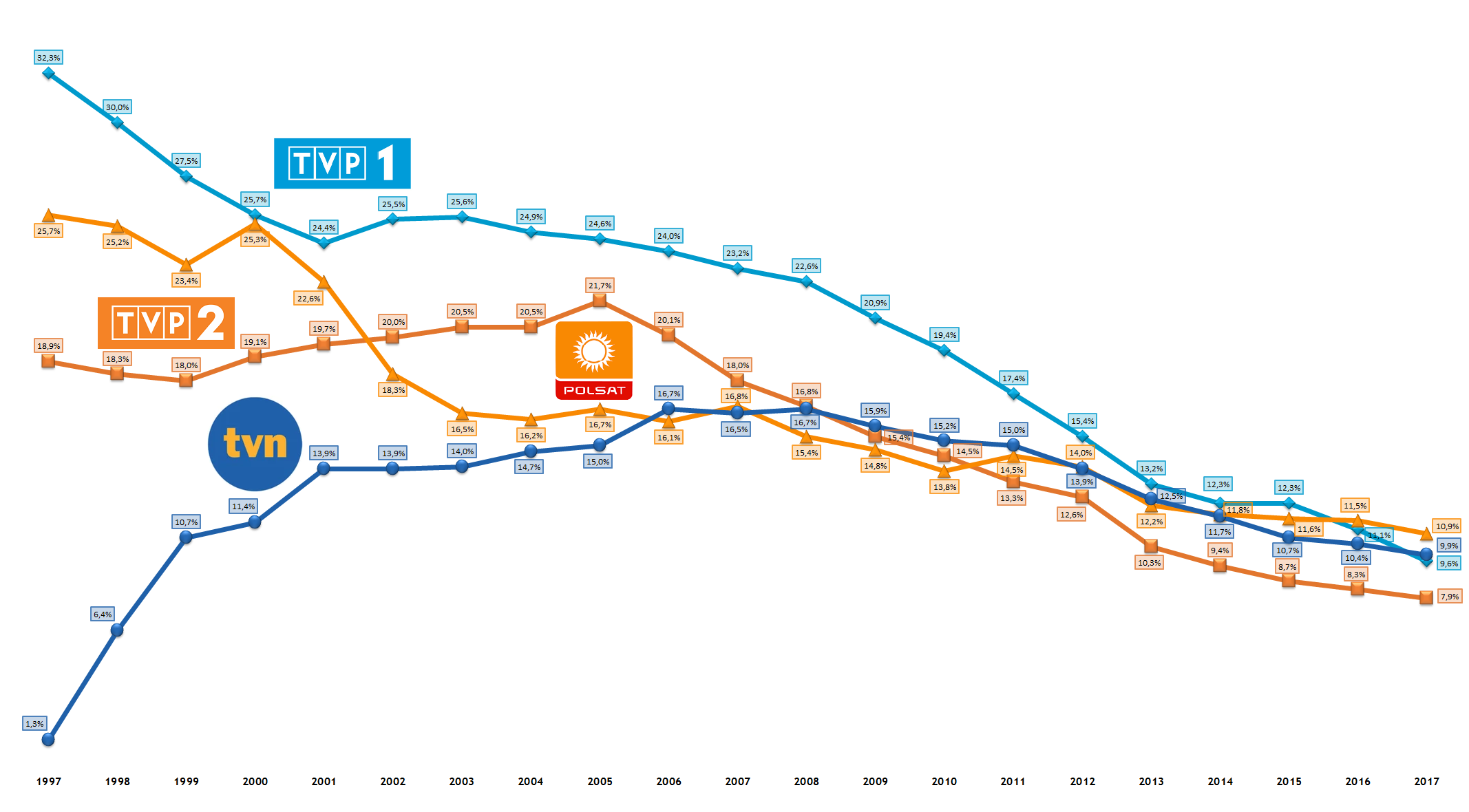
TOP4 of Polish TV channels from 1997 by Nielsen Media Research

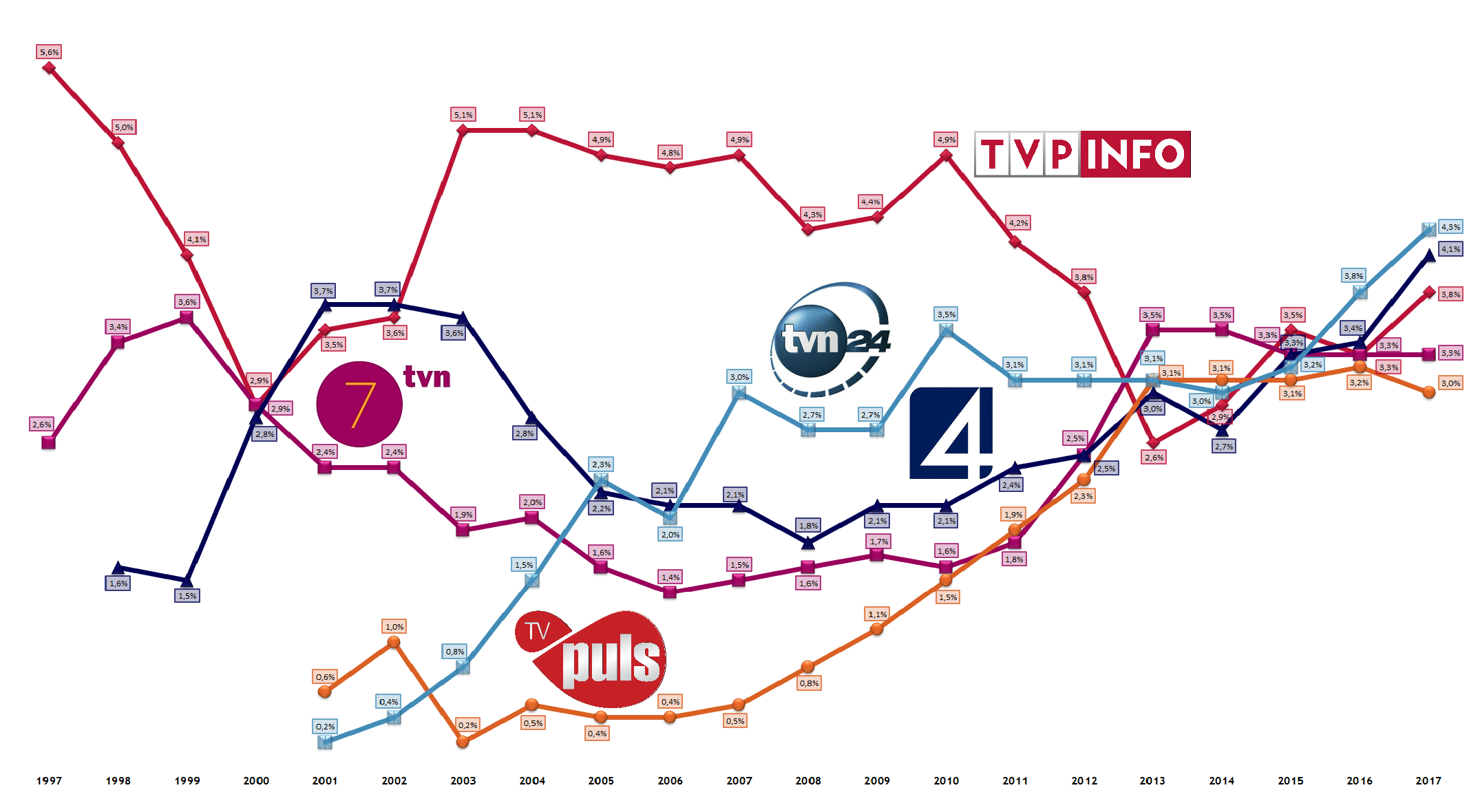
Audience ratings of TV channels above 2% in Poland since 1997 by Nielsen Media Research (TVP Info in 1994-2007 as TVP3 Regionalna, TV4 in 1998-2000 as Nasza TV, TVN7 in 1996-2002 as RTL7)

Top 10 most watched TV broadcasts in Poland from 1998 according to Nielsen Media Research:

	Program	Date	Channel	Number of viewers	Share
1	Funeral of Pope John Paul II	8 April 2005	TVP1, TVP2, TVP3, Polsat, TVN, TVN24 and others	Over 21,400,000	Almost 90%
2	UEFA Euro 2016: Poland vs Portugal (quarter-final)	30 June 2016	TVP1, Polsat, Polsat Sport	15,974,822	86.57%
3	UEFA Euro 2012: Poland vs Russia (group stage)	12 June 2012	TVP1, TVP Sport, TVP HD	14,683,216	81.51%
4	UEFA Euro 2016: Germany vs Poland (group stage)	16 June 2016	TVP1, Polsat, Polsat Sport	14,352,012	80.89%
5	UEFA Euro 2012: Czech Republic vs Poland (group stage)	16 June 2012	TVP1, TVP Sport, TVP HD	14,070,492	81.28%
6	FIFA World Cup 2018: Poland vs Colombia (group stage)	24 June 2018	TVP1, TVP Sport	13,631,335	75.45%
7	UEFA Euro 2012: Poland vs Greece (group stage)	8 June 2012	TVP1, TVP Sport, TVP HD	13,308,343	83.78%
8	2002 Winter Olympics: Ski Jumping Men's K120 Individual (Adam Małysz won the silver medal)	13 February 2002	TVP1	13,259,612	75.15%
9	Funeral of Polish President Lech Kaczynski and his wife Maria	18 April 2010	TVP1, TVP2, TVP Info, Polsat, Polsat News, TVN, TVN24 and others	13,033,967	86.68%
10	UEFA Euro 2016: Ukraine vs Poland (group stage)	21 June 2016	TVP1, Polsat, Polsat Sport	12,639,308	81.67%

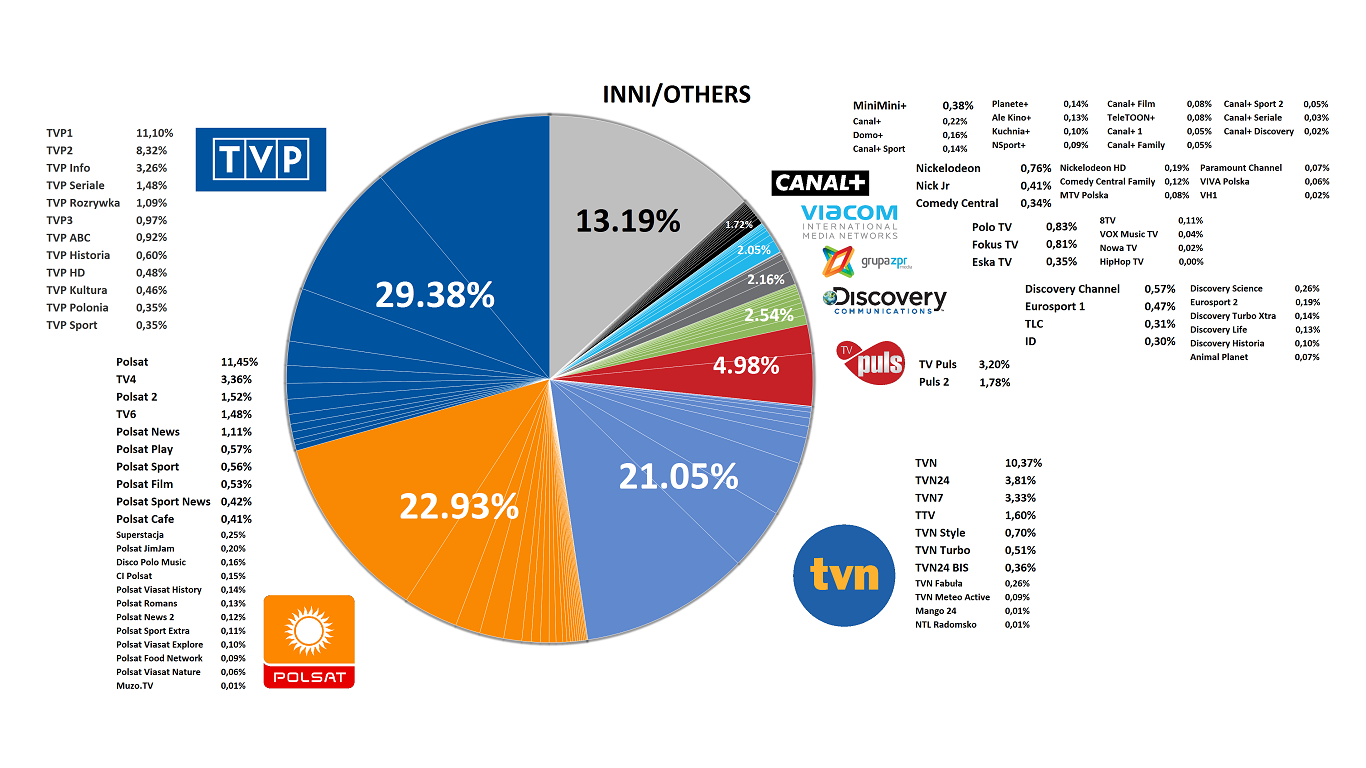
Shares in the television entertainemntet with a this television-polish in the world market in Poland of selected broadcasters groups in 2016 by Nielsen Media Research

== Research and development ==
Advanced Digital Broadcast, with the R&D headquarters based in Zielona Góra, is a Polish company, which introduced many innovations and world's first solutions in the area of Digital TV. One of the co-founders was local professor Janusz C. Szajna.

== See also ==
- List of television stations in Poland
