= Kostiantyn Liberov =

Ukrainian photojournalist

- Костянтин Григорович Ліберов
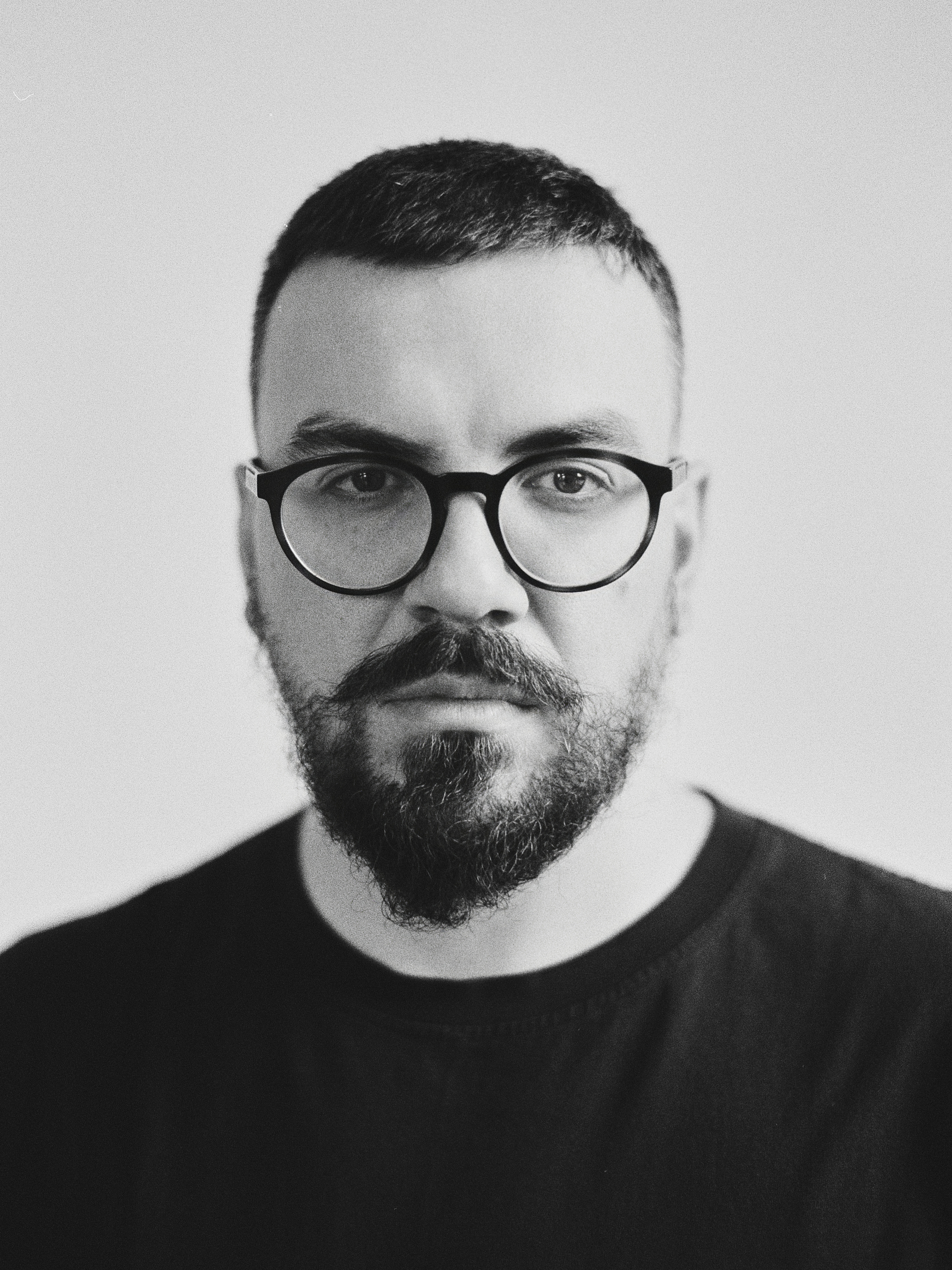
- Born: June 3, 1992 (age 34); Nerubaiske, Biliaivka Raion, Odesa Oblast, Ukraine
- Other name: LIBKOS
- Citizenship: Ukraine
- Education: Odesa I. I. Mechnikov National University (Law)
- Occupations: Documentary photographer, photojournalist
- Organization: Ukrainian Association of Professional Photographers
- Known for: Coverage of the Russian–Ukrainian war; collaboration with Vlada Liberova
- Awards: Order of Merit, 3rd class (Ukraine); Bayeux Calvados-Normandy Award (2023); "For assistance to the Army" (2022–2023); DSNS (State Emergency Service) distinction; KSE Foundation – 150 Foundation Award (2025)

Kostiantyn Liberov (Ukrainian: Костянтин Григорович Ліберов; born 3 June 1992, Nerubaiske, Odesa Oblast) is a Ukrainian documentary photographer and photojournalist known for his coverage of the full-scale Russian invasion of Ukraine. He works as a creative duo with his wife Vlada Liberova under the joint pseudonym LIBKOS. Their collaborative project LIBKOS has received international recognition and has been widely published in global media.

== Biography ==
Liberov was born in Nerubaiske, Odesa Oblast. He attended Lyceum No. 2 in Odesa and later studied law at Odesa I. I. Mechnikov National University.

Before the start of Russo-Ukrainian war in 2022, Liberov worked in artistic and commercial photography, producing portrait and art shoots in collaboration with Vlada Liberova. From 2019 to 2022 he taught an online photography course as part of the educational project "Anti-Photo School" educational project.

== Work ==
After the Russo-Ukrainian war in 2022, Kostiantyn Liberov and Vlada Liberova turned to documenting the war, covering events in frontline and affected regions across Ukraine, including Kharkiv, Sviatohirsk, Mykolaiv, Bucha, Kyiv and other settlements impacted by action. In December 2023, Vlada Liberova sustained a shrapnel wound while on an editorial assignment at the front.

Liberov's works have repeatedly been included in international selections of photographs of the year:

- Top 100 Photos of the Year (Peta Pixel, 2023–2024)
- The Year in Pictures (The Guardian, 2023)
- Images of the Year (The Washington Post, Al Jazeera, 2022–2024)
- Most Powerful Photos of the Year (Business Insider, 2023)
- Year in Review (Getty Images, 2023)
- In Photos Series (The Atlantic, 2023)
- Top 100 Photos (TIME, 2022)
- Top 100 Photos (TIME, 2023)
- Year in Review (Getty Images, 2024)
- THE YEAR IN PICTURES (CNN, 2022)
- THE YEAR IN PICTURES (CNN, 2023)
- AP's top 2022 photos (AP, 2022)
- 2022 in pictures: Following the war in Ukraine (Euronews, 2022)
- Al Jazeera Photos: A year in pictures (Al Jazeera, 2023)
- ENDURING IMAGES (Washington Post, 2023)
- The most powerful news photos of the year (Business Insider, 2023)
- The photographs that defined 2024 (The Guardian, 2024)
- 2022 in Photos: Wrapping Up the Year (The Atlantic, 2022)
- 2023 in Photos: A Look at the Middle Months (The Atlantic, 2023)
- 2024 in Photos: Wrapping Up the Year (The Atlantic, 2024)
- The Year in Pictures 2024 (The Economist, 2024)

Among the publishers, there were The Kyiv Independent, The New York Times, Los Angeles Times, The Wall Street Journal, The Insider, The Independent, TIME, The Guardian, CNN, BBC, The Washington Post, Forbes, Vogue, Euronews, Los Angeles Times, Associated Press, Getty Images, ELLE, Playboy та інші медіа.

Some of his photographs credited by Getty Images / LIBKOS have appeared on TVP World and Slawa.tv.

In 2022–2023, Liberov collaborated with the international agency Associated Press, and Getty Images since 2024.

== Recognition and awards ==
- Bayeux Calvados-Normandy Award for war correspondents (2023).
- Awarded the Order of Merit, 3rd class, by the President of Ukraine on 23 August 2023 for courage, dedication and significant contribution to covering the war.
- "For assistance to the Army" award from the Ministry of Defence of Ukraine and a distinction from the State Emergency Service (DSNS) in 2022–2023.
- KSE Foundation – 150 Foundation Award (2025) for contribution to Ukrainian documentary photography.

== Exhibitions and projects ==
Liberov has participated in exhibitions and projects in more than 15 countries, including Germany, the United Kingdom, France, Italy, Japan, the United States, Lithuania, Poland, Austria, the Netherlands and Switzerland.

Notable exhibitions and projects include:

- Collision Line — Kyiv, Ukraine (VDNG, Pavilion 4, 2024).
- Is This Peace? — Venice, Italy (Chiesa di San Lazzaro dei Mendicanti, 2024)
- At the Heart of War — London, United Kingdom (LSE, 2023).
- Ukraine: Journalists in War Zones — Paris, France (2023).
- Culture vs War — Strasbourg, France (Council of Europe, 2024).
- The Power of Humanity — Osaka, Japan (EXPO 2025, 2025).
- Far and Yet So Close — Leiden, Netherlands (2025).
- War Chronicles: Ukraine 2014–2025 — Kyiv, Ukraine (Book Arsenal, 2025).

== Publications ==
In September 2024, together with cinematographer Serhiy Mykhalchuk and poet Serhiy Zhadan, Liberov presented the Culture vs War art project — an artbook, photo exhibition and a series of documentary films dubbed into several world languages.

Liberov's photographs were included in the collective edition War Chronicles: Ukraine 2014-2025 collective edition, prepared by the Ukrainian Association of Professional Photographers together with FotoEvidence.

== Volunteering and public stance ==
Alongside their professional work, Kostiantyn Liberov and Vlada Liberova participate in volunteer initiatives, coordinating the delivery of humanitarian aid and support for civilians.

In April 2025 the couple published a photograph of a wounded woman after a missile strike on Kyiv that sparked public debate about the ethics of war photography. The Ukrainian Association of Professional Photographers stated that it did not see professional standard violations in the publication and emphasized the importance of documenting the reality of war. The couple later removed the photo amid online criticism.
