= TVP Dokument =

- Logo used since November 2020
- Country: Poland
- Headquarters: Warsaw

Programming
- Language: Polish
- Picture format: 16:9 HDTV

Ownership
- Owner: Telewizja Polska
- Sister channels: TVP1; TVP2; TVP HD; TVP ABC; Alfa TVP; TVP Historia; TVP Info; TVP Kobieta; TVP Kultura; TVP Nauka; TVP Parlament; TVP Polonia; TVP Rozrywka; TVP Seriale; TVP Sport; TVP World

History
- Launched: 19 November 2020

Links
- Website: dokument.tvp.pl

TVP Dokument is a Polish TVP station, which primarily focuses on presenting documentaries and movies. It started broadcasting on 19 November 2020. It is broadcast only in HD via cable and satellite, as well as DVB-T2/HEVC test transmissions.

The channel is planned to be closed by the end of 2024 and be replaced by TVP Wiedza, but currently rejecting the possibility.
