= Klepaczka, Kłobuck County =

Klepaczka
- Village
- Location within Poland
- Coordinates: 50°51′N 18°50′E
- Country: Poland
- Voivodeship: Silesian
- County: Kłobuck
- Gmina: Wręczyca Wielka
- Population: 421

Klepaczka [klɛˈpat͡ʂka] is a village in the administrative district of Gmina Wręczyca Wielka, within Kłobuck County, Silesian Voivodeship, in southern Poland.
