= TVP Parlament =

- Logo used since from June 2011
- Country: Poland

Programming
- Picture format: 16:9 1080p (HDTV)

Ownership
- Owner: Telewizja Polska
- Sister channels: TVP1; TVP2; TVP3; TVP HD; TVP ABC; Alfa TVP; TVP Dokument; TVP Historia; TVP Info; TVP Kobieta; TVP Kultura; TVP Nauka; TVP Polonia; TVP Rozrywka; TVP Seriale; TVP Sport; TVP World

History
- Launched: 16 June 2011

Links
- Website: www.tvpparlament.pl

TVP Parlament is a Polish internet channel run by the public broadcaster TVP. It offers coverage of Polish politics. On 20 December 2023, during the crisis surrounding TVP, its website was redirected to the main TVP website, but on 8 January 2024, the website returned.
