= TVP HD =

Polish television channel

- Logo used since from August 2008
- Country: Poland

Programming
- Picture format: 16:9 1080i (HDTV)

Ownership
- Owner: Telewizja Polska
- Sister channels: TVP1; TVP2; TVP ABC; Alfa TVP; TVP Dokument; TVP Historia; TVP Info; TVP Kobieta; TVP Kultura; TVP Nauka; TVP Parlament; TVP Polonia; TVP Rozrywka; TVP Seriale; TVP Sport; TVP World

History
- Launched: 6 August 2008

Links
- Website: www.tvp.pl

TVP HD is a special High Definition version of the Polish public broadcasting channels (Telewizja Polska). A digital terrestrial multiplex carrying the channel was available in Warsaw, Poznań, Zielona Góra, Żagań, Kraków, Leżajsk and Krosno from the 6 to 25 August 2008.

It was launched in August 2008. Broadcast is 1080i video encoded with MPEG4/H.264.

It is encrypted on Satellite (Hot Bird 13C at 13° east), with 18 hours of daily HD content. During the Olympic Games, the signal replaced TVP Polonia, TVP Historia and TVP Kultura.
