= Fokus TV =

- Country: Poland

Programming
- Language: Polish
- Picture format: 16:9 576i (SDTV); 1080i (HDTV)

Ownership
- Owner: ZPR Media Group; Grupa Polsat Plus
- Sister channels: Nowa TV

History
- Launched: 28 April 2014
- Former names: focus TV

Links
- Website: www.fokus.tv

Availability

Terrestrial
- Polish Digital: MUX 1 - Channel 18 (SD)

Fokus TV is a Polish television channel launched on April 28, 2014. It was established for the purpose of the first DTT multiplex (MUX 1).

On December 4, 2017, Polsat announced that it had bought 34%, bought on February 2, 15.46%, reaching 49% of shares in TV Spektrum, the broadcaster of Fokus TV and Nowa TV.

== Programming ==
The programming schedule consists mainly of documentaries, reality shows, popular science magazines, TV series and movies.

=== Series TV ===
- Hell On Wheels
- The Tudors
- Bomb Girls
- Borgia
- Pat & Mat
- Storage Wars
- Pawn Stars
- Dragon Ball Z Kai
- Dragon Ball Super
