= SC Lithuanian Radio and Television Centre =

Lithuanian Radio and Television Centre
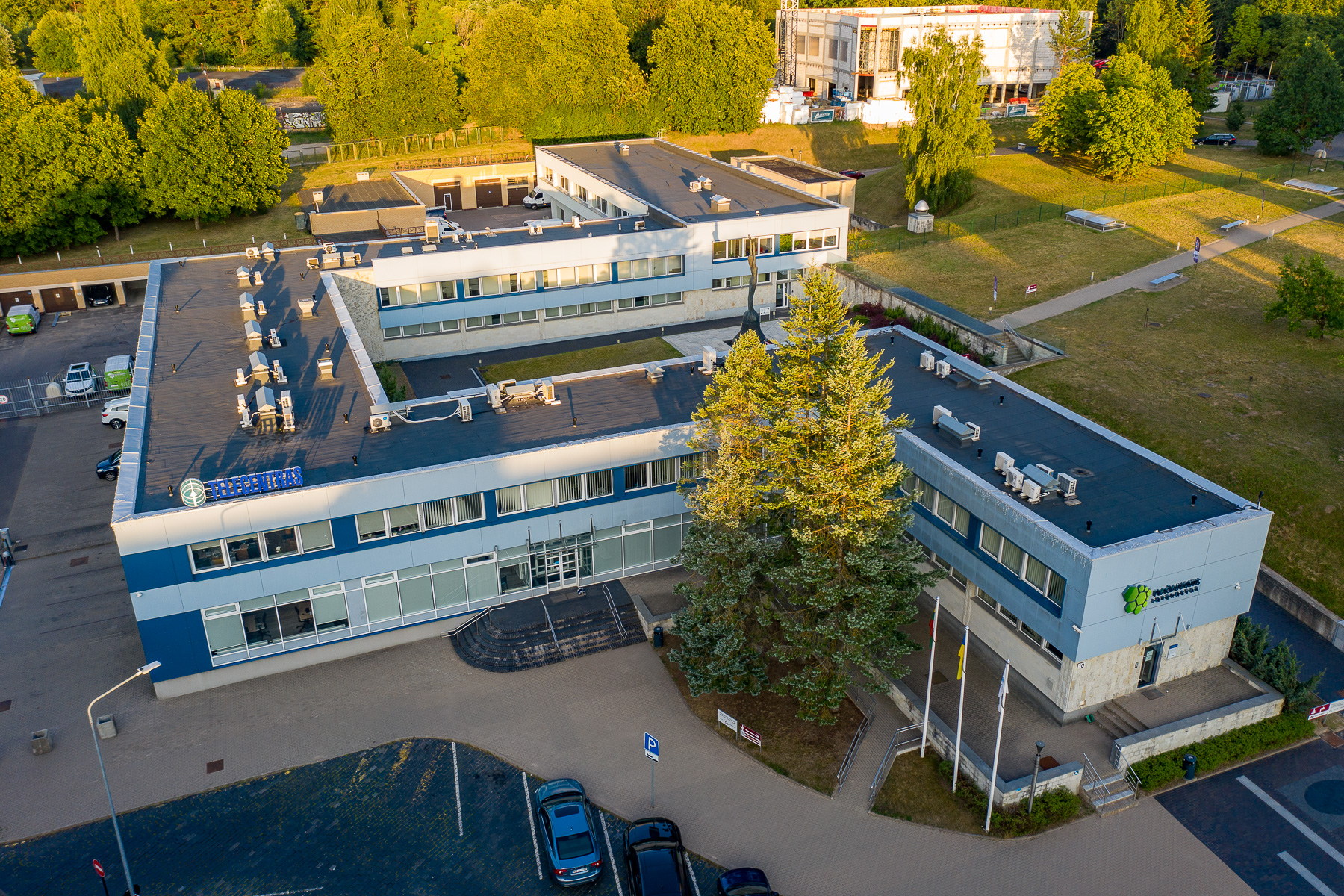
- Industry: Data transmission
- Founded: 19 March 1991
- Headquarters: Vilnius, Lithuania
- Website: telecentras.lt

Lithuanian Radio and Television Centre or LRTC for short, otherwise called as Telecentras, has the most extensive experience in the field of telecommunications among Lithuanian companies. The activity was commenced on 12 April 1926 when the first Lithuanian radio sounds were broadcast from Kaunas radio station. TV programmes broadcasting services were launched on 30 April 1957. The Telecentras is state-owned stock company falling under supervision of the Ministry of Transport and Communications.

== Activity ==
Telecentras maintains the major radio and TV programmes broadcasting networks in Lithuania which include digital terrestrial broadcasting (DVB-T). In 2006, the company began to use TV programs compact standard MPEG-4 AVC/H.264. The introduction of this standard allowed broadcasting of 10 enhanced digital TV programmes through one DVB-T network. Furthermore, this standard provides the possibility to broadcast TV programmes of high definition, too. The Telecentras is the member of global WiMAX Forum. In 2009, the Telecentras was the first company in the European Union which started to provide Internet services using 4G Mobile WiMAX network. From 2012 October 29 the Telecentras broadcasts TV programmes just through DVB-T network.

== Services ==
With the advanced communications technologies the company will not ensure radio and TV programmes broadcasting to all residents of Lithuania, as well as provides data transmission, network connection, telephony and other services. The company has been providing “Erdvės” wireless internet services since 2001, 4G MEZON WiMAX mobile internet since 2009 and 4G LTE mobile internet since 2015 (now acquired by Bite Group for 30 million euros.) The Telecentras owns the highest building in the country: Vilnius TV Tower (326.5 m). Facilities mounted inside and outside TV tower transmit radio and TV signals and data for provision of internet and other services.
