= Nowa TV =

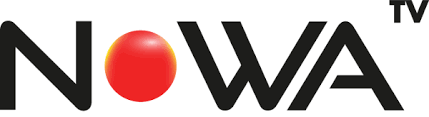
- Country: Poland
- Broadcast area: Nationwide
- Headquarters: Warsaw, Poland

Programming
- Language: Polish
- Picture format: 16:9 576i (SDTV); 1080i (HDTV)

Ownership
- Owner: ZPR Media Group; Grupa Polsat Plus
- Sister channels: Fokus TV

History
- Launched: 9 November 2016; 9 years ago

Links
- Website: www.nowa.tv

Availability

Terrestrial
- Polish Digital: MUX 8 - Channel 40 (SD)

Streaming media
- nowa.tv

Nowa TV is a Polish television channel, launched on November 9, 2016.

On December 4, 2017, Polsat announced that it had bought 34 percent shares of TV Spektrum, which is the broadcaster of Fokus TV and Nowa TV.

== Programming ==
Nowa TV is a general channel, therefore the programming schedule comprises various programs - movies, series, documentaries, entertainment, news and current affairs.

=== News/current affairs ===
- 24 godziny (24 hours) - news programme broadcast daily at 18:30, hosted by Beata Tadla, Joanna Dunikowska, Marek Czyż and Jarosław Kulczycki
- Więc jak? (So how?) - talk-show, hosted by Sławomir Jastrzębowski, editor-in-chief of Super Express

=== Series ===
- Mercy Street
- The Tudors (Dynastia Tudorów)
- Hell on Wheels
- The Bold and the Beautiful (Moda na sukces) - of the 6365. episode (6150. in Polish numbering)
- Drop Dead Diva (Jej Szerokość Afrodyta)
- Bomb Girls (Bombowe dziewczyny)
- Transporter: The Series (Transporter)
- No Limit
- Caïn (Detektyw Cain)
- Profilage (Profil)
- Joséphine, ange gardien (Józefinka)
- La Nouvelle Maud (Szepty przeszłości)
- Avenida Brasil (Zranione uczucie)
