= Polskie Radio Program II =

Polish national radio station

Polskie Radio Program II (PR2)
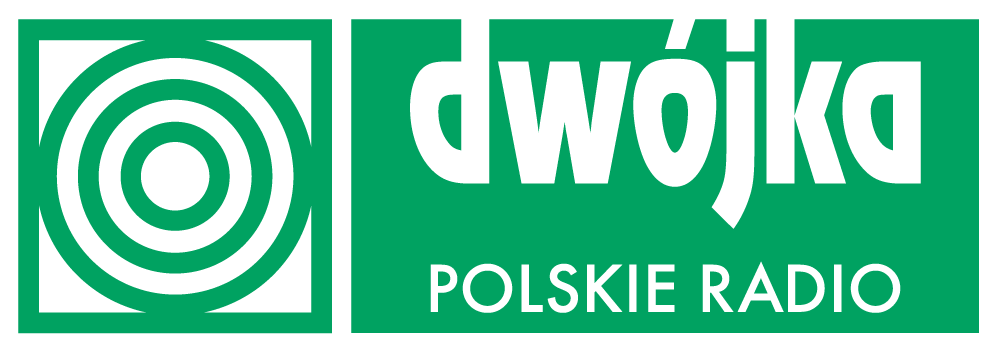
- Warsaw; Poland
- Broadcast area: Poland: Nationally on analogue FM, digital DAB+ & via online streaming
- Frequency: around sixty in the whole country
- Branding: Dwójka (Two)

Programming
- Language: Polish
- Format: Culture, Classical music, Traditional music

Ownership
- Owner: Polskie Radio
- Sister stations: Jedynka; Trójka; Czwórka

History
- First air date: 21 March 1937; 89 years ago

Links
- Webcast: Live Stream
- Website: dwojka.polskieradio.pl

Polskie Radio Program II, also known as PR2 or Dwójka, is a radio channel produced by the Polish public broadcaster, Polskie Radio. It is dedicated to classical music, culture, and the arts. Thanks to its extensive cooperation with other public broadcasters from around the world, the channel provides numerous transmissions of concerts and other classical music events from every part of the globe. It is widely considered to be the most elite-targeted of all Polish radio channels. Its studios are located at the Polskie Radio headquarters in Warsaw. Program 2 often also uses a concert studio belonging to the public Polish Television (TVP).

== Day of protest ==
In a 24-hour protest action – aimed at raising public awareness of the threat posed to the channel, and to the cultural activities it currently supports, by a decrease in public funding and the lack of clear guarantees as to future financing – the staff of Dwójka replaced all scheduled programming between 06.00 on 8 July 2009 and 06.00 the following morning with a recording of bird song interspersed with announcements explaining the reasons for the staff's action and calling for public support.
