= TVP Sport =

Polish television sports channel

- Logo used since from June 2021
- Country: Poland
- Network: TVP

Programming
- Picture format: 576i (16:9 SDTV); 1080i (HDTV)

Ownership
- Owner: Telewizja Polska
- Sister channels: TVP1; TVP2; TVP3; TVP HD; TVP ABC; Alfa TVP; TVP Dokument; TVP Historia; TVP Info; TVP Kobieta; TVP Kultura; TVP Nauka; TVP Parlament; TVP Polonia; TVP Rozrywka; TVP Seriale; TVP World

History
- Launched: 18 November 2006; 19 years ago (SD); 12 January 2014; 12 years ago (HD)

Links
- Website: sport.tvp.pl (Only in Poland)

Availability

Terrestrial
- TVP: MUX3 (HEVC, DVB-T2), Channel 32

TVP Sport is a Polish sport channel, owned by TVP, launched on 18 November 2006. The channel is available on Platforma Canal+, Polsat Box, as well as over cable providers.

== Broadcast ==
SD broadcasting via satellite (Eutelsat Hot Bird) stopped on 6 April 2017.

== Programms ==
- Sportowy wieczór - evening information programm (also on TVP Info)
- Sportowy top tygodnia - discussion of the week's topics with guests and artificial intelligence (AI)
- Gol - Monday football magazine (with main priority on PKO BP Ekstraklasa)
- Ring TVP Sport - magazine about box industry
- Retro TVP Sport - programm about sport events from the TVP archives
- Pełnosprawni - magazine about athletes with disabilities (also on TVP1)
- To zaleźy - interview with a focus on psychology
- Kamera TVP Sport - series of reports and interviews

== Broadcast rights ==
=== Athletics ===
- European Athletics Championships
- European Indoor Athletics Championships
- World Athletics Championships
- World Junior Championships in Athletics
- Janusz Kusociński Memorial
- Kamila Skolimowska Memorial
- Pedros Cup

=== Combat sports ===
- Knockout Boxing Night
- Oktagon MMA
- Top Rank
- Zuffa Boxing

=== Cycling ===
- UCI Road World Championships
- UCI Mountain Bike & Trials World Championships
- UCI Track Cycling World Championships
- Tour de Pologne
- Tour de Suisse
- Arctic Race of Norway

=== Equestrian ===
- Most important competitions in Poland

=== Football ===
- FIFA World Cup
- UEFA European Championship
- UEFA Champions League (one match per matchday (in wednesday evening))
- UEFA Nations League
- PKO BP Ekstraklasa (one match per matchday)
- I liga
- II liga
- Polish Cup
- Polish Super Cup
- Orlen Ekstraliga (one match per matchday)
- Orlen Polish Cup
- matches involving Poland national teams and Polish clubs
- Liga F

=== Futsal ===
- Futsal Ekstraklasa

=== Handball ===
- Polish Superliga (men's handball)
- Ekstraklasa (women's handball)
- European Men's Handball Championship
- European Women's Handball Championship
- IHF World Men's Handball Championship
- IHF World Women's Handball Championship

=== Ice hockey ===
- IIHF World Championships
- Polish Ice Hockey League
- Polish Cup
- NHL

=== Multi-sport Event ===
- Olympic Games

=== Speedway ===
- Polish First League

=== Tennis ===
- WTA Tournaments

=== Weightlifting ===
- World Weightlifting Championships
- European Weightlifting Championships
- Polish Championships

=== Winter sports ===
- FIS Nordic World Ski Championships
- FIS Ski Jumping World Cup
- Biathlon World Cup

== Logos ==
2006 - 2009

2010 - 11 January 2014

12 January 2014 - 11 June 2021

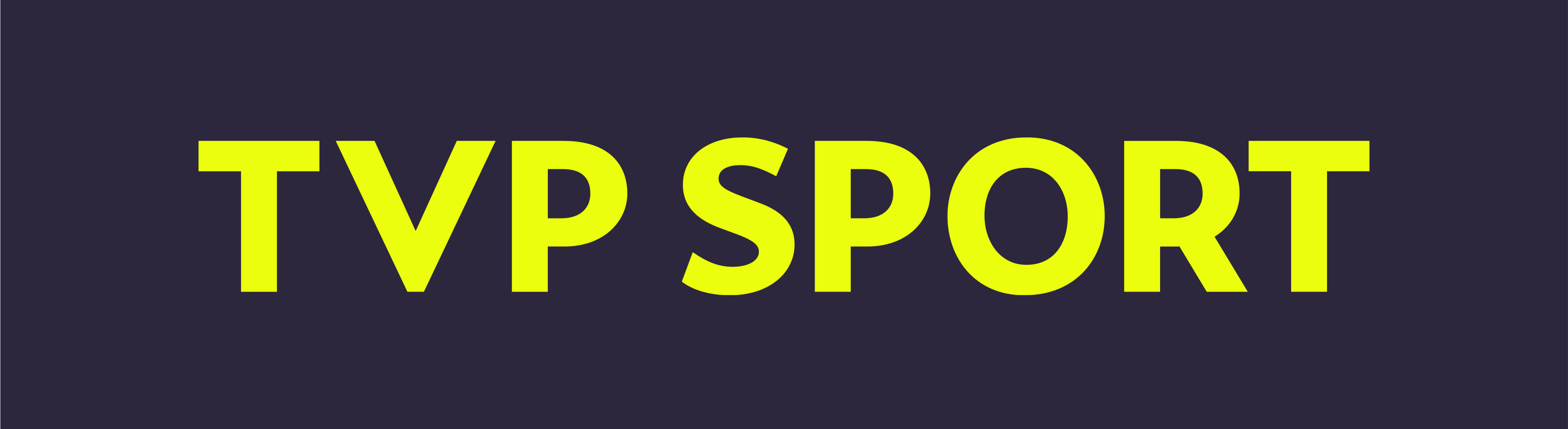
11 June 2021 – present
