= Stopklatka TV =

Polish television movie channel

Stopklatka
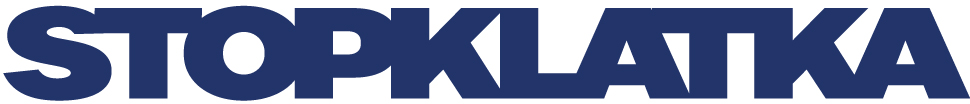
- Country: Poland

Programming
- Picture format: 16:9 576i (SDTV); 16:9 1080i (HDTV)

Ownership
- Owner: Stopklatka SA, Agora SA, Kino Polska TV

History
- Launched: March 15, 2014
- Former names: stopklatka.tv

Links
- Website: http://stopklatka.tv

Availability

Terrestrial
- Polish Digital: MUX 1 (Channel 17)

Stopklatka TV is a Polish television channel owned by Stopklatka SA. It offers film subject matter being involved in a company Kino Polska (Cinema Poland), of SPI International Polska belonging to the group and the Agora S.A. The channel started on March 15, 2014.

== History ==
KRRIT granted concession to this station on 30 October 2013. Stopklatka began broadcasting on 15 march 2014, turning into the first free and public TV channel in Poland. The branding was refreshed on 14 April 2017.

== See also ==
- Television in Poland
- Television in Poland#Terrestrial
