= TV6 (Poland) =

Polish television channel

- Logo used since 3 August 2023
- Country: Poland

Programming
- Picture format: 1080i HDTV

Ownership
- Owner: Grupa Polsat Plus
- Sister channels: TV4; Polsat; Polsat 2; Polsat Rodzina; Super Polsat

History
- Launched: 30 May 2011

Links
- Website: tv6.com.pl

Availability

Terrestrial
- Digital terrestrial television: Channel 10 (Various by area)

TV6 (Six) is a Polish free-to-air television channel originally owned by Polskie Media. Since 1 January 2014, Telewizja Polsat is a direct broadcaster of TV6, as well as its sister channel TV4. It was launched on 30 May 2011.

On 30 April 2013, TV6 gained a new graphic design and a new visual identity. On 1 January 2014, Telewizja Polsat acquired Polskie Media, the owner of TV4 and TV6. On 3 August 2023, TV6 changed its logo for the first time.

== History ==
The channel started broadcasting on 30 May 2011 at 5pm the first program seen being the British version of game show Who Wants to Be a Millionaire? in English without translation. Some lectored programs included new seasons of successful US versions of international formats, such as American Idol and America’s Got Talent, both from the USA, cas well as the British Must Be the Music. The channel also aired animated series: M.A.S.K., Oggy and the Cockroaches, Heathcliff, Inspector Gadget, Digimon and others.

== Logo History ==
2011 - 2023	2023–present

== Programming ==
TV6's programming consists of entertainment, reality shows and quiz shows, which the Polish versions have gained popularity, as well as animated television series for children and adults, sports, situation comedy, and music.

== See also ==
- TV4
- Television in Poland
