= Puls 2 =

Polish television channel

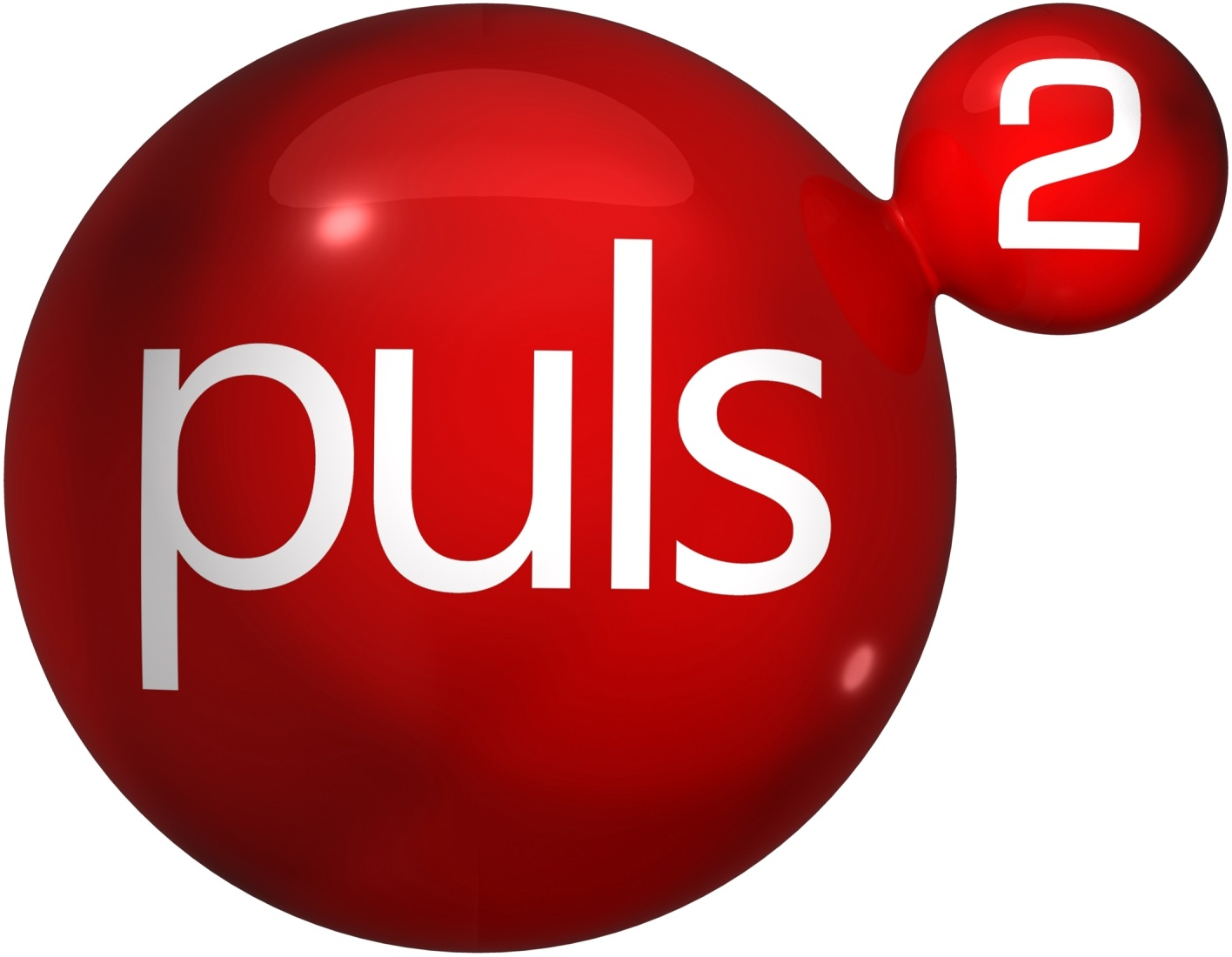
- Country: Poland
- Broadcast area: Nationwide
- Headquarters: Warsaw

Programming
- Language: Polish
- Picture format: 1080i HDTV

Ownership
- Owner: Telewizja Puls
- Sister channels: TV Puls

History
- Launched: 19 July 2012; 14 years ago

Links
- Website: puls2.pl

Availability

Terrestrial
- Digital terrestrial television: Channel 9

Puls 2 is a Polish free-to-air television channel launched on 19 July 2012. It features programming block(s) Puls Kids and Junior TV also for kids, aired from 7am to 7pm.

== History ==
The channel started broadcasting on 19 July 2012 at noon. Its initial programming consisted of lifestyle programmes, talk shows, music programmes and movies, TV series and cartoons. On 1 July 2013, the channel started broadcasting 24 hours a day.

== Logos ==
2012 (test broadcast)	2012 - 2014	2014–present
