= TVP Rozrywka =

- Logo used since from April 2013
- Country: Poland

Programming
- Picture format: 16:9 576i (SDTV)

Ownership
- Owner: Telewizja Polska
- Sister channels: TVP1; TVP2; TVP HD; TVP ABC; Alfa TVP; TVP Dokument; TVP Historia; TVP Info; TVP Kobieta; TVP Kultura; TVP Nauka; TVP Parlament; TVP Polonia; TVP Seriale; TVP Sport; TVP World

History
- Launched: 15 April 2013

Links
- Website: https://tvprozrywka.tvp.pl/

Availability

Terrestrial
- DVB-T2 Test: Channel 85 (LCN)

TVP Rozrywka is a Polish free-to-air television channel. It was launched on 15 April 2013 and focuses its programming on entertainment TV series.

It is broadcast from the Telewizja Polska (TVP) headquarters in Warsaw.

== Availability ==
=== Now ===
==== Terrestrial ====
From September 4, 2020 channel is available from DVB-T2 test in Katowice and Krakow (from November 18, 2020 also in Warsaw, Gdańsk and Poznań)

==== Satellite ====
Channel is available on Polsat Box (Ch57), Platforma Canal+ (Ch19) and Orange TV (DTH) (Ch337)

=== Formerly ===
Since 2013 it was available in DVB-T via MUX3, until June 7, 2018 when it was replaced by TVP Sport. It returned to DVB-T on December 22, 2018 and was available via MUX8. From March 28 to April 2, 2020 it was available simultaneously via MUX3 and MUX8, and from April 2, 2020 to June 9, 2020 only via MUX3 (TVP HD was temporarily available on MUX8, downscaled to SD). This was due to the Szkoła z TVP project. On June 9, 2020, the channel returned to MUX8 replacing TVP HD (SD) and left MUX3. On March 8, 2021, channel was replaced on MUX8 by TVP Kobieta. Since then, it is not available on the nationwide DVB-T.
