= TVP ABC =

Polish television channel

- Logo used since June 2021
- Country: Poland

Programming
- Picture format: 16:9 1080i (HDTV)

Ownership
- Owner: Telewizja Polska
- Sister channels: TVP1; TVP2; TVP HD; Alfa TVP; TVP Dokument; TVP Historia; TVP Info; TVP Kobieta; TVP Kultura; TVP Nauka; TVP Parlament; TVP Polonia; TVP Rozrywka; TVP Seriale; TVP Sport; TVP World

History
- Launched: 15 February 2014

Links
- Website: Official webpage

Availability

Terrestrial
- Polish Digital: MUX 1, 6 (Channel 29)

TVP ABC is a Polish free-to-air television channel offered by Telewizja Polska. The programming is aimed at children, their parents and their teachers.

== Logos and visual identities ==
2014–2021

2021–present
