= TVP Kultura =

Television channel in Poland

- Logo used since 2015
- Country: Poland

Programming
- Picture format: 16:9 576i (SDTV); 1080i (HDTV)

Ownership
- Owner: Telewizja Polska
- Sister channels: TVP1; TVP2; TVP HD; TVP ABC; Alfa TVP; TVP Dokument; TVP Historia; TVP Info; TVP Kobieta; TVP Nauka; TVP Parlament; TVP Polonia; TVP Rozrywka; TVP Seriale; TVP Sport; TVP World

History
- Launched: 24 April 2005

Links
- Website: Official Webpage

Availability

Terrestrial
- Polish Digital: MUX 8 (Channel 30) (HD)

TVP Kultura is TV theme channel to be run by the Polish public broadcaster TVP. It was launched on 24 April 2005 and is dedicated to arts and culture. Every day of the week, the channel concentrates on other disciplines; e.g., cinema, music, etc. It is broadcast from the TVP headquarters in Warsaw and is available on cable networks and on digital platforms in Poland.

== Timetable ==
- April 24, 2005, 5:00 p.m. – TVP Kultura began regular broadcasting. On its launch day, it was available to subscribers of the Polsat Box and Canal+ platforms as well as to individual satellite viewers using unencrypted transmissions from the Hot Bird (13°E), Astra 2C (19.2°E), and Eutelsat W3A (7°E) satellites.
- September 20, 2005 – The first live broadcast of a theater performance took place. The first play shown in this way was Made in Poland, directed by Przemysław Wojcieszek, from the Helena Modrzejewska Theatre in Legnica.
- December 2, 2005 – Telewizja Polska signed an agreement with the Polish Chamber of Electronic Communication for the free distribution of the channel to cable networks. This was the result of a boycott of the station by many cable networks due to a conflict between Telewizja Polska and cable operators. TVP demanded additional fees or the creation of a free package consisting solely of TVP channels, which was technically and financially unfeasible, or an additional fee of PLN 1.50 per outlet. In its first months of broadcasting, TVP Kultura recorded very low viewership. According to AGB Polska, about 812 people watched the station per minute. For comparison: TVN Turbo and TVN Meteo – about 10,000 viewers, TVN24 – over 63,000 viewers, and TVP1 – 1,200,000 viewers. AGB could not record such a low result as a percentage.
- December 16, 2005 – TVP Kultura became available to subscribers of the Aster cable network.
- January 23, 2006 – TVP Kultura became available to subscribers of the Telewizja Kablowa Poznań S.A. cable network.
- January 31, 2006 – The channel became available to Vectra subscribers.
- September 1, 2006 – TVP Kultura began broadcasting commercials.
- October 22, 2007 – The channel appeared in the test multiplex of digital terrestrial television (DVB-T/MPEG-4 standard) in Warsaw, Poznań, Wisła, Rajcza, and Leżajsk.
- November 3, 2008 – TVP Kultura extended its broadcasting hours, starting its programming at 7:00 a.m.
- May 24, 2009 – The channel began broadcasting selected programs in 16:9 format.
- October 27, 2010 – TVP Kultura started broadcasting its programs in the third digital terrestrial television multiplex (MUX 3).
- September 2, 2013 – February 15, 2014 – The evening cartoon program Wieczorynka was moved to TVP Kultura.
- December 29, 2014 – The channel was encrypted on the Eutelsat Hot Bird 13C (13°E) satellite.
- January 1, 2015 – The transmission of TVP Kultura from the Astra 1KR (19.2°E) satellite was switched off.
- April 11, 2015 – TVP Kultura received a new logo and visual design.
- October 23, 2019 – The station began broadcasting in HD on the eighth digital terrestrial television multiplex (MUX 8), which led to the discontinuation of its SD version on MUX 3.
- April 6, 2020 – June 2, 2020 – Together with TVP Sport, TVP Rozrywka, and TVP HD, TVP Kultura broadcast Szkoły z TVP (TVP School) lessons for secondary school students who could not attend school due to the COVID-19 pandemic.
- June 26, 2020 – The online channel TVP Kultura 2 was launched as a supplement to the main channel.
- September 3, 2020 – The station began HD broadcasting on the test terrestrial television multiplex in the DVB-T2 standard.
- November 9, 2020 – TVP Kultura began HD broadcasting on satellite digital platforms.
- February 14, 2022 – TVP Kultura became available for free through the TVP GO app for iOS and Android systems.
- January 3, 2023 – TVP Kultura and TVP Kobieta began HD broadcasting on the sixth digital terrestrial television multiplex (MUX 6).
- January 13, 2023 – The channels TVP Kultura and TVP Kobieta were removed from MUX 8.
- June 1, 2023 – TVP Kultura became available for free on the TVP VOD website and app.
- December 19, 2023 – TVP Kultura in HD quality returned to MUX 3.
- January 13, 2024 – The channel was removed from MUX 6.

=== Visual design ===
The author of the channel’s first visual design (animation), used from the beginning of its broadcasting, was Mariusz Wilczyński.

The second design, created by the UNIFORMA Graphic Design and Animation Studio, debuted on air in March 2010.

On April 9, 2011, a new design by Piotr Młodożeniec was introduced.

From April 11, 2015, the channel’s visual design was created by Julia Mirny. On that day, a new logo was also introduced, replacing the one used since the channel’s inception.

Another design was introduced on January 7, 2018, and the sixth and current version was launched in 2020.

== Distribution ==
Broadcasting via Astra 19.2°E started in 2005, but was ceased on 31 December 2014 due to economic reasons.

== Logos and identities ==
2005 - 2015

2015–present
