= TVP Historia =

Polish broadcast television channel

- Logo used since from May 2007
- Country: Poland

Programming
- Picture format: 16:9 (576i, SDTV)

Ownership
- Owner: Telewizja Polska
- Sister channels: TVP1; TVP2; TVP HD; TVP ABC; Alfa TVP; TVP Dokument; TVP Info; TVP Kobieta; TVP Kultura; TVP Nauka; TVP Parlament; TVP Polonia; TVP Rozrywka; TVP Seriale; TVP Sport; TVP World

History
- Launched: May 3, 2007; 18 years ago

Links
- Website: tvphistoria.pl

Availability

Terrestrial
- Digital terrestrial television: Channel 31

TVP Historia is a Polish free-to-air television channel that was launched in May 2007. It focuses on history programming.

The channel is planned to be closed by the end of 2024 and be replaced by TVP Wiedza, but currently rejecting the possibility.
