= TVP Info =

Polish 24-hour news channel

- Logo used since 30 September 2024
- Country: Poland
- Broadcast area: Nationwide, (parts of Germany, Lithuania, Europe, United States)

Programming
- Picture format: 1080i HDTV (downscaled to 16:9 576i for the SDTV feed)

Ownership
- Owner: Telewizja Polska
- Sister channels: TVP1; TVP2; TVP3; TVP HD; TVP ABC; Alfa TVP; TVP Dokument; TVP Historia; TVP Kobieta; TVP Kultura; TVP Nauka; TVP Parlament; TVP Polonia; TVP Rozrywka; TVP Seriale; TVP Sport; TVP World

History
- Launched: 6 October 2007 (original); (hiatus from 20–28 December 2023); 29 December 2023 (relaunch)
- Replaced: National Television (TVP3 Polska)

Links
- Website: tvp.info

Availability

Terrestrial
- TVP: MUX3 (HEVC, DVB-T2), Channel 34
- Telecentras: MUX LRTC2 (DVB-T)
- Telecentras: Local MUX in South-East Lithuania (DVB-T)

Streaming media
- tvp.info: Watch live
- TVP VOD: Watch live
- YouTube: Watch live

TVP Info is a Polish free-to-air television news channel, run by the public state broadcaster TVP. It is focused on newscasts, mainly broadcasting nationwide news bulletins. Until 20 December 2023, its main offices were located in the Television Information Agency building at Warsaw Insurgents Square; since 29 December 2023 the channel's activities are carried out from the main TVP building on Woronicza Street, Warsaw.

== History ==
TVP Info replaced TVP3 and was launched October 2007. It has regional branches in most of the major Polish cities and, similarly to France 3 in France or Rai Tre in Italy, for a couple of hours every day it broadcasts regional programming, including local news and reports in sixteen versions. These were transferred to the revived TVP Regionalna (which later was renamed TVP3 again) in September 2013. In addition, it disseminates certain programs on YouTube, where it has the TVP World channel.

Broadcasting via Astra 19.2°E started in 2005, but was discontinued on 31 December 2014 due to economic issues.

TVP Info has been broadcast in 16:9 since 23 February 2011. Its HD simulcast feed was launched on 30 September 2016 on digital terrestrial television and on 5 April 2017 on Hot Bird satellite. The SD feed was closed down there on 21 April 2017.

Just weeks after winning the 2015 parliamentary elections, the conservative Law and Justice party passed a media law in December 2015 giving the government direct control over public broadcasting. It is fully controlled by Poland's government, causing Reporters Without Borders to bemoan the fact.

The first media reports about TVP Info HD appeared in December 2014, which were confirmed in March 2015 by TVP president Juliusz Braun.

On 15 February 2016, TVP President Jacek Kurski announced in a media interview that he planned to launch TVP Info HD. In the night of 18 to 19 July 2016, due to the planned launch of TVP Info HD on the third digital terrestrial television multiplex, TVP Polonia was replaced. On 26 September 2016, TVP announced that the station would broadcast in HD resolution starting 30 September 2016. As per that date, TVP Info HD was available via the multiplex of the third digital terrestrial television and in cable networks. Via satellite, only the SD feed could be tuned in until 5 April 2017.

On 5 April 2017 at 1:00 pm, TVP Info HD started broadcasting via satellite. On 20 April 2017, TVP Info shut down its SD feed.

According to Kurski, the channel would be set to begin broadcasting in 1080i50 in early 2018, accompanied by a change of the scenery for the main studio of TVP Info.

In November 2021, an English-language channel known as TVP World was launched, its initial date having been brought forward from January 2022 due to "the situation on the Polish-Belarusian border, and the need to produce honest and fair reporting, especially regarding issues that feature false reporting along with propaganda disinformation from Russia and Belarus". The TVP President Kurski said: "Polish public television feels responsible for defending the Polish raison d’état, which is why we hastened TVP World’s debut." The channel is simulcast on TVP Info during late nights. Later, the channel TVP World only ran for 24 hours, since the middle of 2022.

On 16 August 2024, Telewizja Polska announced it is preparing for the launch of TVP Info from a new studio and in a new setting. Tomasz Sygut announced that the TVP Info logo will also change at the same time, this will be first fully logo change after 2023 Polish public media crisis, the channel's live broadcasts will remain in the same place. The first new programs in the autumn season were launched on 9 September 2024. Changes in the logo and studio took place on 30 September 2024 and broadcast from Studio S-11, TVP Headquarters.

=== Closure and relaunch ===
On 20 December 2023, a day after the Polish Sejm (now controlled by a coalition of parties opposed to the Law and Justice party) passed a resolution demanding the restoration of legal order at public broadcasters, TVP Info went off air at 11:18:31 CET. Its website redirected users to the main TVP website, while both the terrestrial broadcast and the online stream began alternating between programming from TVP 1 (except for news programming which was replaced by a standby sequence of the TVP 1 logo), programming from TVP Polonia (again without any news programming), and repeats of Ranczo. The apparent shutdown had been preceded earlier in the day by the new government's culture minister, Bartłomiej Sienkiewicz, announcing his decision to dismiss the current presidents and supervisory boards of TVP, Polskie Radio, and the Polish Press Agency. A YouTube stream, showing a television screen with what would be TVP Info's normal output, went live at around 14:00 CET and lasted for under half an hour before being terminated. The TVP World channel also went off air, with the broadcast being switched to that of TVP Polonia and the TVP World website redirecting users to the main TVP website; a formal suspension of operations until mid-January was announced on 27 December, with its director Filip Styczyński adding that he had been relived of his duties. The decision to take TVP Info off air was taken by Tomasz Sygut, who had been appointed as the new TVP CEO the day before.

On 28 December, multiple outlets reported that TVP Info's broadcasting was to be resumed on 29 December. Programmes such as the Minęła series of talk shows, Forum, and Woronicza 17 would remain part of the lineup, while programmes such as W tyle wizji that were deemed to be more politically charged would no longer be produced and would not receive direct replacements. Grzegorz Sajór confirmed that transmissions would resume at 7:30 p.m CET, concurrent with the recently introduced 19.30 news programme. The relaunched channel would indeed begin with 19.30, followed by a guest segment in which 19.30 presenter Joanna Dunikowska-Paź interviewed Waldemar Skrzypczak in relation to how a Russian missile intended for Ukraine entered Polish airspace for some time. At 20:15 CET, Minęła 20 was presented by Jarosław Kulczycki who introduced viewers to the relaunched TVP Info proper and said it would now give voice to all sides and would aim to unite Poles rather than divide them. The channel initially continued to discuss the Russian missile incident, then began a discussion on public media. The first news bulletin since the relaunch began at 21:00 CET, with Zbigniew Łuczyński serving as presenter.

The initial broadcast used a modified version of the previous incarnation's logo and reused visual sequences pertaining to commercial breaks and public service announcements (up to 24 January 2024, when it changed idents), but did feature a new filler sequence (and newsroom background) centered around the motif of water droplets joining up with one another to eventually form one large droplet. It did not feature chyrons or a news ticker, but Grzegorz Sajór said that these elements were being worked on.

Just before noon on 15 January 2024, the TVP Info website and YouTube channel were restored; access to archived material was also restored where said material was not biased towards the previous Law and Justice government. Andrzej Jaszczyszyn was named as the head of the restored tvp.info service. On 19 January 2024, TVP Info's schedule was again changed, with the evening program Publicystyka TVP Info divided into two discussion programs and the "Oko na Świat" program at 23:00 CET (since May at 22:00 CET); on the same day, they moved to a new studio, but in same place. On 22 January 2024, TVP Info regained effective control of its X account; the account had previously continued to be under the control of Samuel Pereira and other pre-takeover individuals until at least 11 January.

On 5 February 2024, the relaunch of TVP World was unofficially described by online news outlet Wirtualnemedia.pl as being imminent, with the station's schedule being worked on; Jerzy Kamiński was described as carrying out director duties. On 8 February 2024, it became known that channel programmes would be produced and aired from a building in the Warsaw Insurgents Square, instead of the TVP headquarters as was the case previously. Unofficially, it is known that TVP World may resume broadcasting by the end of February. On 29 February 2024, it was announced that Michał Broniatowski would become the new director of TVP World from March.

On 4 March 2024, the program was changed again, this time the Morning and Evening programs were changed, and 4 new programs were introduced, one of them was on air again.

On 8 March 2024, Wirtualnemedia.pl reported that TVP World would resume broadcasting on cable and digital platforms on 11 March, with plans to launch German, Russian and Ukrainian language services at a later date.

On 21 March 2025, TVP Info started broadcasting on YouTube.

== Logos ==
6 October 2007 - 20 December 2023

29 December 2023 - 29 September 2024

30 September 2024
