= TVP World =

Polish 24-hour world news channel

- Logo used since from November 2021
- Country: Poland
- Broadcast area: Worldwide

Programming
- Language: English
- Picture format: 1080i HDTV (downscaled to 16:9 576i for the SDTV feed)

Ownership
- Owner: TVP International Media Centre
- Key people: Michał Broniatowski (Director of TVP International Media Centre)
- Sister channels: Belsat; TVP Polonia; TVP Wilno

History
- Launched: 18 November 2021 (original); 11 March 2024 (relaunch)
- Replaced: Poland IN
- Closed: 20 December 2023 (original)

Links
- Website: tvpworld.com internationalmediacentre.com

Availability

Terrestrial
- Emitel (Poland): MUX3 (Channel 91, HbbTV) and MUX6 (Channel 33)
- Channelbox UK: COM4/SDN (Channel 271, HbbTV)
- Simpli (Austria): Local MUX in Vienna (Channel 45, Pay TV)
- Levira (Estonia): MUX6 (Channel 10, DVB-T)
- Telecentras (Lithuania): MUX2 and MUX in South-East Lithuania (DVB-T)

Streaming media
- tvpworld.com: Watch live
- TVP VOD: Watch live
- YouTube: Stream

TVP World (previously known as Poland IN) is a Polish international news network operated by Telewizja Polska, consisting of an English-language 24-hour news channel and a web service. It was launched on 18 November 2021, replacing the online television Poland IN which was launched on 11 November 2018 (National Independence Day). The channel's goal is delivering news from a Polish viewpoint and promoting the soft power of the Polish Government.

== Programmes ==
- World News Tonight
- World News German (news in German language)
- Eastern Express
- Break the Fake
- Military Mind
- Business Arena
- Ukraine This Week
- In Focus
- How We Got Here
- Interview from Vilnius
- Pulse of Culture
- Warsaw Debate
- The Bottom Line
- Wider View
- Press Corner
