= TVP Polonia =

- Logo used since from February 2020
- Country: Poland
- Broadcast area: International; Poland

Programming
- Languages: Polish; English
- Picture format: 16:9 (1080i, HDTV); 16:9 (1080p50, HDTV) (only on terrestrial DVB-T2 test in Poland)

Ownership
- Owner: Telewizja Polska (International Media Centre)
- Sister channels: TVP World

History
- Launched: 24 October 1992; 33 years ago (trial); 31 March 1993; 33 years ago (regularly)
- Former names: TV Polonia (1992-2003)

Links
- Website: polonia.tvp.pl

Availability

Terrestrial
- Telecentras: MUX LRTC2 and local MUX in South-East Lithuania (DVB-T)
- TVP: MUX6 (HEVC, DVB-T2)

Streaming media
- TVP VOD: https://vod.tvp.pl/na-zywo (worldwide)

TVP Polonia, formerly known as TV Polonia, is an international channel of the Polish public service broadcaster Telewizja Polska (TVP) aimed at the Polish diaspora. The channel is co-funded by TVP and the Polish Ministry of Foreign Affairs, and broadcasts from the TVP headquarters in Warsaw.

It's one of two international channels of TVP alongside TVP World and broadcasts many of the shows also aired by the broadcaster's domestic channels, in addition to news from Polish communities around the world.

It was launched in October 1992 (trial) and regularly in March 1993. On 1 September 2020, an HD version was launched (replacing SD version on Hot Bird 13).

Since 1 December 2025, the channel has been part of TVP's International Media Centre ("Ośrodek Mediów dla Zagranicy"). In 2026, programming covering the daily life of the Polish diaspora was discontinued due to financial constraints and replaced by the programme Polonia 24. Tygodnik.

== Presenters ==
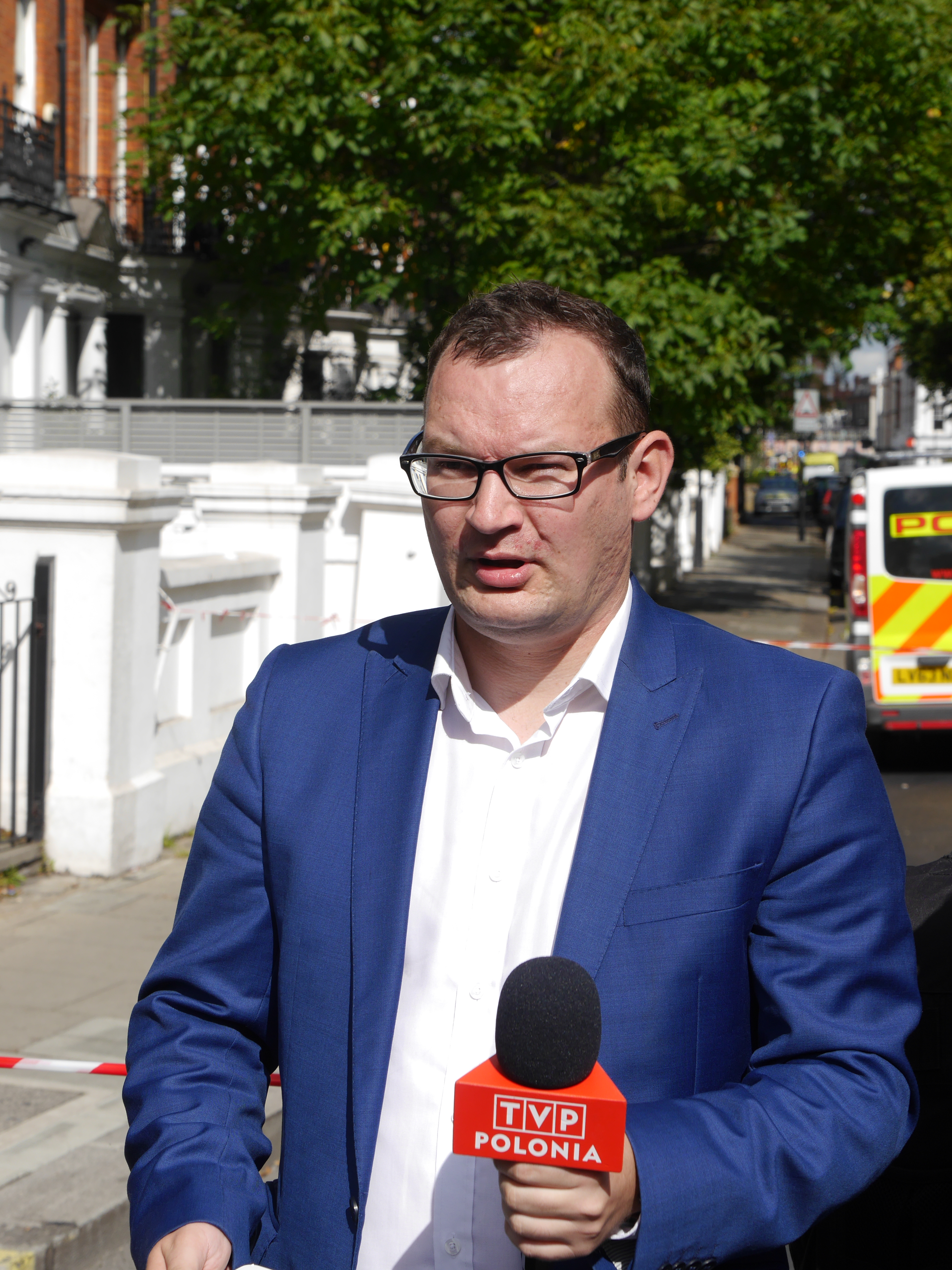
TVP Polonia reporter reporting on the Parsons Green bombing in September 2017.

- Monika Jóźwik (1994–2009)
- Łukasz Kardas (TV presenter; since 2011)

== Distribution ==
TVP Polonia is available in many countries around the world via cable or satellite. It is also transmitted unencrypted from various satellites.

Broadcasting via Astra 19.2°E started in 2005, but was ceased on 31 December 2014 due to economic reasons.

The feeds of the network in the Americas were distributed by the Canadian company Spanski Enterprises, under a 25-year agreement that ran from 13 December 1994 to 14 December 2019. In 2016, the U.S. District Court for the District of Columbia found TVP guilty of copyright infringement, based on accusations by Spanski that TVP offered streaming episodes of its programmes without geoblocking on its domestic website—infringing the exclusive rights that had been licensed to Spanski and registered by them with the United States Copyright Office. The channel's feeds in the Americas ceased transmission on 14 December 2019.

On 9 December 2011 TVP Polonia was added to terrestrial MUX3 in Poland, then removed on 19 July 2016 to free up some space for TVP Info HD. On 4 September 2020 TVP Polonia HD was added to DVB-T2 test multiplex (also known as MUX5). Unlike satellite broadcast, it is broadcasting there in 1080p50 (on the satellite, it is in 1080i).

On 17 July 2021, TVP Polonia made its return to linear TV in the USA, on both Dish Network and Sling TV (on Sling it is also available with TVP Wilno).

== Logos and identities ==
The first logo was an uppercase TVPOLONIA wordmark derived from the TVP logo of the time, with a Polish flag above. This was replaced on 31 March 1997 by a white-red gradient with the channel's name below. On 7 March 2003, when the channel was renamed TVP Polonia, the logo matched the uniform style adopted by all TVP channels, with red as its on-air color. Since 4 February 2020, the word POLONIA was enlarged and detached from the box.

== Logo History ==
1992 - 1997	1997 - 2003	2003 - 2020	25th anniversary logo	2020–present
