= List of tallest structures in Poland =

This list contains all types of structures at least 100 metres (328 ft) tall that exist or existed in the area that is now Poland.

== Tallest structures ==
Name	Height		Year	Type	City	Coordinates	Notes
Warsaw radio mast	646.4m	2121 ft	1972–1974	Guyed mast	Gąbin/Konstantynów, Masovian Voivodeship	52°22′3.74″N 19°48′8.73″E	Collapsed on August 8, 1991; insulated against ground; once the tallest structure in the world
FM- and TV-mast Kosztowy	358.70 m	1177 ft	1976	Guyed mast	Mysłowice, Silesian Voivodeship	50°11′16.75″N 19°06′57.97″E	
FM- and TV-mast Olsztyn-Pieczewo	356.50 m	1170 ft	1969	Guyed mast	Olsztyn/Pieczewo, Warmian-Masurian Voivodeship	53°45′11.94″N 20°31′5.33″E	
FM- and TV-mast Zygry	346 m	1135 ft	1975	Guyed mast	Zygry, Łódź Voivodeship	51°46′45.04″N 18°57′7.11″E	
Piaski transmitter	342 m	1122 ft	1990	Guyed mast	Piaski, Lublin Voivodeship	51°7′49.67″N 22°52′12.89″E	
FM- and TV-mast Klepaczka (Wręczyca Transmitter)	340 m	1115 ft	1997	Guyed mast	Klepaczka, Silesian Voivodeship	50°50′49.31″N 18°51′48.23″E	
Longwave transmitter Raszyn	335 m	1099 ft	1949	Guyed mast	Raszyn, Masovian Voivodeship	52°4′21.72″N 20°53′2.15″E	Insulated against ground
RTCN Białystok (Krynice), Mast 1	331 m	1086 ft	1996	Guyed mast	Krynice, Podlaskie Voivodeship	53°13′53.6″N 23°1′36.12″E	
Longwave-transmitter Solec Kujawski, Mast 1	330 m	1083 ft	1998/99	Guyed mast	Solec Kujawski, Kuyavian-Pomeranian Voivodeship	53°1′21.01″N 18°15′32.63″E	
FM/TV Mast Miłki	327 m	1073 ft	1998	Guyed mast	Miłki, Warmian-Masurian Voivodeship	53°56′16.76″N 21°50′41.94″E	
Transmitter Rusinowo	320 m	1050 ft	1995	Guyed mast	Rusinowo, West Pomeranian Voivodeship	53°10′14.48″N 16°15′41.76″E	
Trzeciewiec Transmitter	320 m	1050 ft	1962	Guyed mast	Trzeciewiec, Kuyavian-Pomeranian Voivodeship	53°15′59.62″N 18°10′25.95″E	
Limża/Kisielice Transmitter	320 m	1050 ft	2002	Guyed mast	Limża, Warmian-Masurian Voivodeship	53°36′50″N 19°13′16″E	
Żółwieniec Transmitter	320 m	1050 ft	1992	Guyed mast	Żółwieniec, Greater Poland Voivodeship	52°23′55.56″N 18°19′38.43″E	
Fm and TV Mast Chwaszczyno	317 m	1040 ft	1962	Guyed mast	Chwaszczyno, Pomeranian Voivodeship	54°27′10.03″N 18°26′9.67″E	
Jemiołów Transmitter	314 m	1030 ft	1962	Guyed mast	Jemiołów, Lubusz Voivodeship	52°20′48.89″N 15°16′32.12″E	
Łosice transmitter	313 m	1027 ft	1974	Guyed mast	Łosice, Masovian Voivodeship	52°11′9.54″N 22°46′54.57″E	
Varso Tower	310 m	1017 ft	2022	Skyscraper	Warsaw	52°13′44.008″N 21°0′0.364″E	Tallest building in the European Union
Chimney of Rybnik Power Station	300 m	984 ft	1974	Chimney	Rybnik, Silesian Voivodeship	50°8′4.54″N 18°31′22.77″E	
Chimney of Power Station Jaworzno	300 m	984 ft	1977	Chimney	Jaworzno, Silesian Voivodeship	50°12′25.29″N 19°12′18.71″E	
Chimneys of Power Station Bełchatów	300 m	984 ft	1975	Chimney	Bełchatów, Łódź Voivodeship	51°15′58.55″N 19°19′41.72″E; 51°15′58.36″N 19°19′24.34″E	
Chimney of Power Station Kozienice	300 m	984 ft	1978	Chimney	Kozienice, Masovian Voivodeship	51°39′58.63″N 21°27′43.69″E	
Chimney of Kawęczyn Heat Plant	300 m	984 ft	1983	Chimney	Warsaw-Kawęczyn, Masovian Voivodeship	52°16′05.34″N 21°7′43.86″E	
Śrem transmitter	290 m	951 ft	1964	Guyed mast	Śrem, Greater Poland Voivodeship	52°07′2.22″N 16°59′3.04″E	
Longwave-transmitter Solec Kujawski, Mast 2	289 m	948 ft	1998/99	Guyed mast	Solec Kujawski, Kuyavian-Pomeranian Voivodeship	53°1′12.83″N 18°15′44.06″E	
Choragwica transmitter	288 m	945 ft	1962/63	Guyed mast	Chorągwica, Lesser Poland Voivodeship	49°57′31.04″N 20°4′54.99″E	
Transmitter Żagań-Wichów	280 m	919 ft	2003	Guyed mast	Żagań-Wichów, Lubusz Voivodeship	51°44′49.63″N 15°28′46.97″E	
Chimney of EC-4 Łódź Power Plant	274 m	899 ft	1977	Chimney	Łódź	51°44′43.83″N 19°32′16.5″E	
Mikstat Transmitter	273 m	895 ft	1997	Guyed mast	Mikstat, Greater Poland Voivodeship	51°31′56″N 17°59′39″E	
Gołogóra transmitter, Mast 1	271 m	889 ft	1962	Guyed mast	Gołogóra, West Pomeranian Voivodeship	54°0′14.76″N 16°44′16.16″E	
Transmitter Szczecin-Kołowo, Mast 2	267 m	876 ft	1985	Guyed mast	Szczecin/Kołowo, West Pomeranian Voivodeship	53°20′1.43″N 14°40′28.9″E	
Rachocin Transmitter	261 m	856 ft	1979	Guyed mast	Rachocin, Masovian Voivodeship	52°53′28″N 19°39′42″E	
Chimney of Power Plant Siersza	260 m	853 ft		Chimney	Siersza, Lesse Poland Voivodeship	50°12′31.06″N 19°27′39.19″E	
Transmitter Studzieniec	260 m	853 ft		Guyed mast	Studzieniec, Masovian Voivodeship	52°53′28.16″N 19°38′57.65″E	
Transmitter Żórawina	260 m	853 ft		Guyed mast	Żórawina, Lower Silesian Voivodeship	50°58′59.89″N 17°1′16.21″E	
Chimney of Power Plant Kraków-Leg	260 m	853 ft		Chimney	Kraków, Lesser Poland Voivodeship	50°3′14.47″N 20°0′24.68″E	
Chimney of Power Plant Rybnik	260 m	853 ft		Chimney	Rybnik, Silesian Voivodeship	50°8′1.18″N 18°31′15.2″E	
Chimney of Pruszków II Power Station	256 m	840 ft		Chimney	Moszna-Parcela	52°10′30.75″N 20°44′33.79″E	No longer used as a chimney
Chimney of Połaniec Power Station	250 m	820 ft		Chimney	Połaniec, Świętokrzyskie Voivodeship	50°26′14.51″N 21°20′13.57″E; 50°26′11.61″N 21°20′6.77″E	Two chimneys
Chimney of Dolna Odra Power Station	250 m	820 ft		Chimney	Nowe Czarnowo, West Pomeranian Voivodeship	53°12′24.33″N 14°27′59.73″E; 53°12′20.41″N 14°27′54.69″E	Two chimneys
Chimney of Katowice Steel Mill	250 m	820 ft		Chimney	Katowice, Silesian Voivodeship	50°20′56.79″N 19°17′39.48″E	
Chimney of Power Plant Opole	250 m	820 ft		Chimney	Opole, Opole Voivodeship	50°45′04.13″N 17°52′57.39″E	
Chimney of Chemitex-Wiskord Factory	250 m	820 ft		Chimney	Szczecin, West Pomeranian Voivodeship	53°21′17.53″N 14°34′12.23″E	
Large Flarestick of Płock refinery	250 m	820 ft		Chimney	Płock, Masovian Voivodeship	52°35′9.81″N 19°40′15.21″E	
FM- and TV-mast Rusinowo, Mast 2	234 m	768 ft		Guyed mast	Rusinowo		Demolished
Krzemianucha Transmitter	232 m	741 ft		Guyed mast	Krzemianucha/Suwałki, Podlaskie Voivodeship	54°11′46.51″N 22°52′21.64″E	
Palace of Culture and Science	231 m	758 ft	1955	Skyscraper	Warsaw	52°13′54.76″N 21°0′21.89″E	
Chimney of Power Plant Lubin	230 m	755 ft		Chimney	Lubin, Lower Silesian Voivodeship	51°22′31.28″N 16°10′50.81″E	
Transmitter Szczecin-Kolowo, Mast 1	228 m	748 ft	1963	Guyed mast	Kołowo	53°20′1.1″N 14°40′30.09″E	Height was reduced in 1989 to 61 metres
RCTN Białystok/Krynice, Mast 2	226 m	741 ft	1962	Guyed mast	Krynice, Podlaskie Voivodeship	53°13′52.84″N 23°1′34.23″E	Reduced in size to 102 metres in 1996
Chimney of Power Plant Bielsko Biala	225 m	738 ft	1975	Chimney	Czechowice-Dziedzice, Silesian Voivodeship	49°52′23.83″N 19°1′45.74″E	
Chimney of Power Plant Kraków-Leg	225 m	738 ft		Chimney	Kraków	50°03′14.32″N 20°0′19.03″E	
Chimney of Power Plant Głogów	221 m	725 ft		Chimney	Głogów, Lower Silesian Voivodeship	51°39′45.48″N 16°7′24.83″E	Demolished in 2022, before that used for rope jumping
Przebędowo Transmitter	220 m	722 ft	1953	Guyed mast	Przebędowo	52°35′45″N 16°59′20″E	Demolished in 1998
Chimney of Power Plant Polkowice	220 m	722 ft		Chimney	Polkowice, Lower Silesian Voivodeship	51°28′57.37″N 16°4′0.29″E	
Chimney of Power Plant Toruń	220 m	722 ft		Chimney	Toruń, Kuyavian-Pomeranian Voivodeship	53°02′52.6″N 18°41′35.89″E	
Large Chimney of Płock refinery	220 m	722 ft		Chimney	Płock, Masovian Voivodeship	52°35′1.85″N 19°41′15.62″E	
FM- and TV-mast Ryki	215 m	705 ft	2000	Guyed mast	Ryki, Lublin Voivodeship	51°37′22.75″N 21°58′4.40″E	
Chimney of Kielce Power Station	215 m	705 ft	1987	Chimney	Kielce,Świętokrzyskie Voivodeship	50°53′51.71″N 20°36′59.09″E	
Kozłowiec Transmitter	213 m	669 ft		Guyed mast	Kozłowiec, Masovian Voivodeship	51°21′30.88″N 20°34′19.96″E	
Boży Dar transmitter, FM-/TV-Mast	210 m	689 ft		Guyed mast	Boży Dar, Lublin Voivodeship	51°0′17.46″N 22°39′12.88″E	
Sławoborze Transmitter	210 m	689 ft		Guyed mast	Białogard/Sławoborze, West Pomeranian Voivodeship	53°53′6.25″N 15°40′57.5″E	
Nowy Tomyśl Wind Turbines	210 m	689 ft		Lattice tower	Nowy Tomyśl, Greater Poland Voivodeship	52°17′39″N 16°09′00″E; 52°17′41″N 16°09′22″E	Two towers
Warsaw Trade Tower	205 m	673 ft		Skyscraper	Warsaw	52°14′7.87″N 20°58′56.82″E	
Chimney 571	205 m	673 ft		Chimney	Police, West Pomeranian Voivodeship	53°22′29.79″N 14°31′58.34″E	
Żarnowiec Meteorological Mast	205 m	673 ft	?	Guyed mast	Żarnowiec, Pomeranian Voivodeship	54°43′55″N 18°05′35″E	Demolished
Chimney of Rzeszow Power Station	203 m	666 ft		Chimney	Rzeszów, Subcarpathian Voivodeship	50°03′54.31″N 22°01′50.52″E	
Chimney of Dolna Odra Power Station	200 m	656 ft		Chimney	Nowe Czarnowo, West Pomeranian Voivodeship	53°12′16.4″N 14°27′48.14″E	
Wola Rasztowska Transmitter	200 m	656 ft	1953	Guyed mast	Wola Rasztowska	52°26′53″N 21°17′29″E	Two masts; demolished
Fm and TV Mast Chwaszczyno, 2nd mast	200 m	656 ft	1962	Guyed mast	Chwaszczyno, Pomeranian Voivodeship	54°27′14″N 18°25′55″E	
Chrzelice Transmitter	200 m	656 ft		Guyed mast	Chrzelice, Opole Voivodeship	50°29′43.91″N 17°43′41.08″E	
Chimney of EC-4 Łódź Power Plant	200 m	656 ft		Chimney	Łódź	51°44′44.88″N 19°32′28.82″E	
Chimney of Power Plant Katowice	200 m	656 ft		Chimney	Katowice	50°17′08.13″N 19°3′14.07″E	
Chimney of Power Plant Zabrze	200 m	656 ft	1986	Chimney	Zabrze, Silesian Voivodeship	50°17′56.35″N 18°48′44.69″E	
Chimney of Power Station Kozienice	200 m	656 ft	1972	Chimney	Kozienice, Masovian Voivodeship	51°39′48.67″N 21°27′52.34″E; 51°39′52.79″N 21°27′49.33″E	
Chimney of Łagisza Power Station	200 m	656 ft	1960 to 1970	Chimney	Będzin/Łagisza, Silesian Voivodeship	50°20′59.53″N 19°8′32.6″E	
Chimney of Pątnów Power Station	200 m	656 ft		Chimney	Pątnów		Demolished
Chimney of Power Station Poznań-Karolin	200 m	656 ft		Chimney	Poznań/Karolin	52°26′11.13″N 16°59′19.09″E	
Łaziska Power Station Chimney	200 m	656 ft	1917	Chimney	Łaziska, Silesian Voivodeship	50°08′4.3″N 18°50′39.63″E	
Kraków Arcelor-Mittal Steel Works Chimney	200 m	656 ft		Chimney	Kraków	50°04′49.21″N 20°5′32.18″E; 50°04′50.76″N 20°5′35.41″E	
Chimney 2,3,4 of Siekierki Heat Power Station	200 m	656 ft	1972/1977/2009	Chimney	Warsaw/Siekierki	52°11′23.88″N 21°5′20.27″E 52°11′13.84″N 21°5′19.83″E; 52°11′17.98″N 21°5′19.89″E	
Chimney of Gdańsk Heat Power Station	200 m	656 ft		Chimney	Gdańsk	54°22′43.31″N 18°38′25.12″E	
Chimney of Zeran Heat Power Station	200 m	656 ft		Chimney	Warsaw/Żerań	52°17′41.03″N 20°59′36.08″E	
Rondo 1	194 m	636 ft		Skyscraper	Warsaw	52°13′58.21″N 20°59′58.67″E	
Chimney of Power Station Wrocław	184 m	604 ft		Chimney	Wrocław	51°07′25.17″N 17°01′28.61″E	
Large Chimney South of ANWIL Włocławek	182 m	597 ft		Chimney	Włocławek	52°42′24.49″N 18°57′28.27″E	
Large Chimney North of ANWIL Włocławek	180 m	591 ft		Chimney	Włocławek	52°42′51.07″N 18°57′33.45″E	
Chimney of Zdieszowice Odra Valley Coke Factory	180 m	591 ft		Chimney	Zdzieszowice, Opole Voivodeship	50°25′14.2″N 18°08′57.08″E	
Chimney Głogów	180 m	591 ft		Chimney	Głogów		
Chimney of Power Station Tychy	180 m	591 ft	1958	Chimney	Tychy, Silesian Voivodeship	50°06′20.27″N 19°01′01.94″E	
Chimney of EC-3 Łódź Power Plant	180 m	591 ft		Chimney	Łódź	51°47′51.58″N 19°25′15.29″E	
Cooling tower of Power Station Bełchatów, Unit 2	180 m	591 ft	2008	Chimney	Bełchatów,Łódź Voivodeship	51°16′17.51″N 19°19′5.86″E	
Krobia Wind Turbines	178 m	584 ft		Wind turbine	Krobia	51°42′54″N 16°55′28″E; 51°42′56″N 16°55′10″E; 51°43′01″N 16°54′50″E; 51°43′06″N 16°54′33″E; 51°43′44″N 16°56′31″E; 51°43′47″N 16°56′08″E; 51°43′52″N 16°58′50″E; 51°44′01″N 16°58′22″E; 51°44′05″N 16°58′46″E; 51°44′10″N 16°57′36″E; 51°44′13″N 16°58′20″E	
Pągów Wind Turbines	177 m	581 ft		Wind turbine	Pągów	51°08′00″N 17°38′42″E; 51°08′09″N 17°39′34″E; 51°08′10″N 17°39′06″E; 51°08′13″N 17°37′22″E; 51°08′15″N 17°38′34″E; 51°08′24″N 17°39′31″E; 51°08′24″N 17°37′29″E; 51°08′25″N 17°37′02″E; 51°08′26″N 17°39′01″E; 51°08′57″N 17°37′41″E; 51°09′01″N 17°37′16″E; 51°09′10″N 17°37′34″E; 51°09′26″N 17°37′16″E	
Chimney of Dolna Odra Power Station	170 m	558 ft		Chimney	Nowe Czarnowo	53°12′24.75″N 14°28′3.84″E	
Karczew KPEC Chimney	170 m	558 ft		Chimney	Karczew	52°04′39″N 21°16′8″E	
Hotel Marriott	170 m	558 ft	1989	Skyscraper	Warsaw	52°13′39″N 21°0′16″E	
Chimney 5 of Siekierki Heat Power Station	170 m	558 ft	2009	Chimney	Warsaw/Siekierki	52°11′27.7″N 21°5′21.66″E	
Warsaw Financial Center	165 m	541 ft	1999	Skyscraper	Warsaw	52°14′0″N 21°0′7″E	
Chimney of Zakłady Azotowe Puławy	165 m	541 ft		Chimney	Puławy, Lublin Voivodeship	51°27′26.3″N 21°58′24.77″E	
InterContinental Warsaw	164 m	538 ft	2003	Skyscraper	Warsaw	52°13′56.3″N 21°0′9.16″E	
RON Ruda Śląska Radio Mast	160 m	525 ft	1958	Guyed mast	Ruda Śląska	50°18′15.02″N 18°50′38.35″E	Insulated against ground; demolished in 1988
Chimney of Bielsko Biela Power Plant	160 m	525 ft		Chimney	Bielsko Biała	49°48′43″N 19°03′12″E	
Small Chimney of Łagisza Power Plant	160 m	525 ft		Chimney	Będzin/Łagisza	50°20′56″N 19°08′31″E	
Chimneys of Oświęcim Chemical Factory	160 m	525 ft		Chimney	Oświęcim	50°02′24.2″N 19°16′22.3″E; 50°02′24″N 19°16′26.4″E	
Chimney of EC-2 Łódź Power Plant	160 m	525 ft	1958	Chimney	Łódź	51°44′32.34″N 19°26′55.36″E	
Święty Krzyż TV Tower	157 m	515 ft	1966	Reinforced concrete Tower	Szklana Huta/Łysa Góra, Świętokrzyskie Voivodeship	50°51′36.32″N 21°2′52.5″E	
Chimney Siersza Power Plant	156 m	512 ft		Chimney	Siersza	50°12′28″N 19°27′41″E	
Tarnawatka Transmitter	154 m	505 ft		Guyed mast	Tarnawatka, Lublin Voivodeship	50°31′24″N 23°23′49″E	
Chimney of Miejska Cogeneration Station	152.1 m	499 ft		Chimney	Łomża	53°10′11″N 22°01′59″E	
Large Chimney of Kwidzyn Paper Factory	152.1 m	499 ft		Chimney	Kwidzyn	53°42′00″N 18°55′19″E	
Chimney of Gdańsk oil refinery	152 m	499 ft		Chimney	Gdańsk	54°20′46″N 18°43′48″E	
Chimney of Power Station Gorlice	151 m	495 ft		Chimney	Gorlice, Lesser Poland Voivodeship	49°40′38″N 21°10′55″E	
Transmitter Lidzbark Warmiński, Radio Mast	151 m	495 ft	1940	Guyed mast	Lidzbark Warmiński	54°08′24″N 20°33′46″E	Demolished in 1945 and rebuilt
Chimney of Gdynia Power Plant	150.88 m	495 ft		Chimney	Gdynia	54°33′12″N 18°28′51″E	
Chimneys of Pątnów Power Station	150.27 m	493 ft		Chimney	Pątnów	52°18′6.67″N 18°14′0.64″E; 52°18′6.69″N 18°14′6.4″E; 52°18′8.51″N 18°14′12.66″E	
Chimney 414	150.27 m	493 ft		Chimney	Police, West Pomeranian Voivodeship	53°34′19.06″N 14°32′23.22″E	
Chimney IV-306	150.27 m	493 ft		Chimney	Police, West Pomeranian Voivodeship	53°34′19.47″N 14°32′40.85″E	
Chimney East	150.27 m	493 ft		Chimney	Police, West Pomeranian Voivodeship	53°34′22.36″N 14°32′38.88″E	
Chimney I-337	150.27 m	493 ft		Chimney	Police, West Pomeranian Voivodeship	53°34′28.13″N 14°32′34.96″E	
Wola Rasztowska transmitter	150 m	492 ft	1953	Guyed mast	Wola Rasztowska	52°26′53″N 21°17′29″E	Two masts; demolished
Oxford Tower	150 m	492 ft	1979	Skyscraper	Warsaw	52°13′34″N 21°0′15″E	
Łaziska Steel Works, Chimney South	150 m	492 ft		Chimney	Łaziska, Silesian Voivodeship	50°07′52″N 18°50′06″E	
Chimneys of Turów Power Station	150 m	492 ft		Chimney	Turów	50°56′52.44″N 14°54′33.93″E; 50°56′51.12″N 14°54′41.97″E	
Chimney of Kopalni Siarki Machów	150 m	492 ft		Chimney	Machów	50°31′27″N 21°38′16″E	
Chimney of Legnica Copper Smelter	150 m	492 ft		Chimney	Legnica	51°11′05″N 16°06′49″E	
Chimney of SFM Mosina	150 m	492 ft		Chimney	Mosina	52°14′20″N 16°51′10″E	
Chimney of Lafarge Cement Polska	150 m	492 ft		Chimney	Bielawy	52°50′15″N 17°59′20″E	
Chimney of Soda Matwy	150 m	492 ft		Chimney	Inowrocław	52°44′59″N 18°14′28″E	
Chimney of ENEA Gorzów	150 m	492 ft		Chimney	Gorzów Wielkopolski	52°45′01″N 15°16′16″E	
Chimney of Power Station Lublin	150 m	492 ft		Chimney	Lublin	51°12′58″N 22°33′29″E	
Chimney of Adamów Power Plant	150 m	492 ft		Chimney	Turek	52°00′45″N 18°32′46″E	
Chimney Stalowa Wola	150 m	492 ft		Chimney	Stalowa Wola	50°33′16″N 22°04′44″E	
Radom longwave transmitter	150 m	492 ft		Guyed mast	Radom	51°24′29″N 21°6′50″E	
Large Chimney of Zakrzów Heat Generation Station	150 m	492 ft		Chimney	Opole	50°41′12″N 17°55′14″E	
Large Chimney of Głogów Copper Smelter	150 m	492 ft		Chimney	Głogów	51°41′1″N 15°59′17″E	
Chimneys of Elektrociepłownia EC Nowa	150 m	492 ft		Chimney	Katowice	50°20′59″N 19°16′38″E; 50°20′52″N 19°16′41″E	Two chimneys
Chimneys of Pątnów Power Station	149 m	489 ft		Chimney	Pątnów	52°18′8.35″N 18°14′6.69″E; 52°18′8.07″N 18°13′59.66″E	
Chimney of Power Station Toruń	148 m	485 ft		Chimney	Toruń	53°02′49″N 18°40′26″E	
Sanctuary of Our Lady of Licheń	141.5 m	464 ft	2004	Church	Licheń Stary	52°19′23.65″N 18°21′24.27″E	One of the tallest and largest churches in the world
Transmitter Żórawina, old tower	140 m	459 ft	1932	Wooden lattice tower	Żórawina	50°59′6.41″N 17°01′11.81″E	Demolished in 1990
Chimney Pabianice	140 m	459 ft		Chimney	Pabianice	51°39′46″N 19°21′29″E	
Chimney Skleczki	140 m	459 ft		Chimney	Skleczki	52°12′35″N 19°24′15″E	
Ostrołęka Radio Tower	140 m	459 ft	2008	Lattice tower	Ostrołęka	53°04′42″N 21°37′42″E	
Tymien Wind turbines	140 m	459 ft	?	Wind turbines	Tymien	54°11′55″N 15°48′13″E; 54°12′09″N 15°47′48″E; 54°12′11″N 15°49′32″E; 54°12′00″N 15°49′12″E; 54°11′31″N 15°49′17″E; 54°11′45″N 15°49′10″E; 54°11′40″N 15°49′37″E; 54°12′04″N 15°50′03″E; 54°11′51″N 15°49′53″E; 54°12′06″N 15°51′44″E; 54°11′51″N 15°51′46″E; 54°11′37″N 15°51′47″E; 54°11′24″N 15°51′27″E; 54°12′01″N 15°52′17″E; 54°11′38″N 15°52′15″E; 54°12′00″N 15°52′49″E; 54°11′47″N 15°52′36″E; 54°11′06″N 15°48′58″E; 54°10′55″N 15°49′21″E; 54°10′42″N 15°49′51″E; 54°10′30″N 15°50′11″E; 54°10′43″N 15°49′06″E; 54°10′31″N 15°49′20″E; 54°10′29″N 15°49′45″E; 54°10′14″N 15°49′50″E	25 units
Karscino Wind turbines	139 m	456 ft	?	Wind turbines	Karscino	54°01′40″N 15°48′20″E; 54°01′42″N 15°47′58″E; 54°01′46″N 15°48′58″E; 54°01′51″N 15°48′32″E; 54°01′57″N 15°48′05″E; 54°02′10″N 15°48′15″E; 54°02′13″N 15°47′29″E; 54°02′18″N 15°47′59″E; 54°02′28″N 15°48′34″E; 54°02′37″N 15°47′22″E; 54°02′39″N 15°47′01″E; 54°02′39″N 15°48′23″E; 54°02′41″N 15°48′46″E; 54°02′41″N 15°49′31″E; 54°02′44″N 15°49′10″E; 54°02′54″N 15°49′37″E; 54°02′55″N 15°48′46″E; 54°03′06″N 15°49′41″E; 54°03′08″N 15°48′53″E; 54°03′19″N 15°49′03″E; 54°03′22″N 15°44′48″E; 54°03′22″N 15°45′10″E; 54°03′22″N 15°45′32″E; 54°03′22″N 15°46′20″E; 54°03′22″N 15°46′56″E; 54°03′26″N 15°48′45″E; 54°03′31″N 15°48′27″E; 54°03′34″N 15°45′50″E	46 units
Chimney of Przedsiebiorstwo Energetyki Cieplnej SA	138 m	453 ft		Chimney	Wałbrzych	50°49′3.29″N 16°16′54.72″E	
Intraco Building II	138 m	453 ft	1975	Skyscraper	Warsaw	52°15′16″N 20°59′49″E	
Transmitter Koszęcin, MW-Mast	138 m	453 ft	1977	Guyed mast	Koszęcin	50°39′15″N 18°51′25″E	Insulated against ground
Sea Towers	138 m	453 ft	2008	Skyscraper	Gdynia	54°31′18″N 18°32′55″E	
RTCN Bartniki	137 m	449 ft		Guyed mast	Bartniki	52°0′58″N 20°13′58″E	
Chimney of Czechnica Heat&Power Station	137 m	449 ft		Chimney	Siechnice	51°02′16.07″N 17°08′57.73″E	
Mount Ślęża transmitter	136 m	446 ft	1972	Additionally guyed tower	Mount Ślęża	50°51′53″N 16°42′39″E	
RTCN Nowa Karczma	134 m	439 ft	1995	Guyed mast	Nowa Karczma	51°8′58″N 15°10′23″E	
Millennium Plaza	133 m	436 ft	1999	Skyscraper	Warsaw	52°13′29″N 20°59′30″E	
Chimney Łódź	133 m	436 ft		Chimney	Łódź	51°42′50″N 19°27′32″E	
Chimney of FHU Mag	132 m	433 ft		Chimney	Bytom	50°23′01″N 18°54′48″E	
Chlodnia Opole	132 m	433 ft		Cooling tower	Opole	50°45′05″N 17°53′19″E	
Chimney Knurów	130 m	427 ft		Chimney	Chełmek	50°12′54″N 18°40′43″E	
Chimney of KWK Katowice	130 m	427 ft		Chimney	Katowice	50°15′50″N 19°01′46″E	Demolished
Leżajsk Transmitter	130 m	427 ft		Guyed Tower	Giedlarowa, Subcarpathian Voivodeship	50°14′53″N 22°24′18″E	Additionally guyed tower
Kotlownia Chimney	129 m	423 ft		Chimney	Wałbrzych	50°48′45.75″N 16°17′3.78″E	
Chimney Siemianowice	129 m	423 ft		Chimney	Siemianowice Śląskie, Silesian Voivodeship	50°17′56″N 19°01′54″E (approximate)	
Świebodów Radio Tower	129 m	423 ft		Tower	Świebodów	51°28′1″N 17°18′25″E	
Piątkowo transmitter, TV Tower 2	128 m	420 ft	1993	Lattice tower	Poznań-Piątkowo	52°27′32″N 16°54′20″E	
TP SA Tower	128 m	420 ft	2003	Skyscraper	Warsaw	52°13′38″N 21°0′33″E	
Babice Transmitter	127 m	417 ft	1922	Tower	Babice	52°15′50″N 20°52′40″E	Ten towers that carried antenna for VLF-transmission; destroyed in 1945
Chimney Chełmek	127 m	417 ft		Chimney	Chełmek	50°06′13″N 19°15′24″E	
Nowodwory pylon of Nowodwory-Łomianki Vistula Powerline Crossing	127 m	417 ft	?	Electricity pylon	Nowodwory (Warsaw)	52°19′32.67″N 20°56′08.42″E	
Skolwin pylon of Skolwin-Inoujście Odra Powerline Crossing	126 m	413 ft	?	Electricity pylon	Skolwin	53°31′28.21″N 14°37′42.6″E	
Błękitny Wieżowiec	126 m	413 ft		Skyscraper	Warsaw	52°14′39″N 21°0′09″E	
Suwnica bramowa	126 m	413 ft	2002	Crane	Gdynia	54°32′22″N 18°30′47″E	Shipyard crane with 1000 tons lifting capacity; replaced a similar crane, which was destroyed in December 1999 during a storm
Chimney Bieruń	125 m	410 ft		Chimney	Bieruń	50°05′01″N 19°09′58″E	
Chimney Nikiszowiec	125 m	410 ft		Chimney	Katowice/Nikiszowiec	50°14′24″N 19°04′45″E	
Chimney of KWK Katowice	125 m	410 ft		Chimney	Katowice	50°15′50″N 19°01′46″E	Demolished
Chimney Myszków	125 m	410 ft		Chimney	Myszków, Silesian Voivodeship	50°35′30″N 19°19′34″E (approximate)	
Chimney Olsztyn-Słoneczny Stok	125 m	410 ft		Chimney	Olsztyn-Słoneczny	53°44′48″N 20°26′31″E	
Inoujście pylon of Skolwin-Inoujście Odra Powerline Crossing	125 m	410 ft	?	Electricity pylon	Inoujście	53°31′37.94″N 14°38′13.86″E	
Poltegor Centre	125 m	410 ft	1982	Skyscraper	Wrocław	51°5′38″N 17°1′11″E	
Altus Skyscraper	125 m	410 ft	2003	Skyscraper	Katowice	50°15′41″N 19°1′26″E	
Reform Plaza	124 m	407 ft		Skyscraper	Warsaw	52°13′30″N 20°59′35″E	
Chimney Wołomin	124 m	407 ft		Chimney	Wołomin	52°21′26″N 21°15′57″E	
Łodygowo Wind turbines	124 m	407 ft	?	Wind turbines	Łodygowo	53°35′31″N 19°11′27″E; 53°35′35″N 19°11′47″E; 53°35′37″N 19°11′17″E; 53°35′43″N 19°11′59″E; 53°35′42″N 19°11′39″E; 53°35′44″N 19°11′07″E; 53°35′47″N 19°11′26″E; 53°35′52″N 19°11′54″E; 53°35′52″N 19°11′00″E; 53°35′54″N 19°11′38″E; 53°35′59″N 19°11′25″E; 53°36′03″N 19°11′12″E; 53°36′05″N 19°10′55″E; 53°37′00″N 19°10′18″E; 53°37′03″N 19°10′01″E; 53°37′06″N 19°09′46″E; 53°37′12″N 19°10′21″E; 53°37′12″N 19°09′35″E; 53°37′14″N 19°10′01″E; 53°37′21″N 19°09′45″E; 53°37′29″N 19°09′56″E; 53°38′08″N 19°11′18″E; 53°38′09″N 19°10′55″E; 53°38′15″N 19°11′40″E; 53°38′18″N 19°11′22″E; 53°38′19″N 19°10′46″E; 53°38′23″N 19°11′36″E	27 units
Bierkowo TV Tower	124 m	407 ft	2010	Lattice tower	Bierkowo	54°28′59.85″N 16°56′27.92″E	
Malczewskiego transmitter	123 m	404 ft		Guyed mast	Kraków	50°3′1.12″N 19°54′6.17″E	Insulated against ground
Chimney of Power Station Dębica	123 m	404 ft		Chimney	Kraków/Dębica	50°02′47″N 21°23′17″E	
Dębice Radio Tower	123 m	404 ft		Lattice tower	Dębice	51°8′39.61″N 16°28′58.67″E	
Chimney of Dąbska Cogeneration Station	122.1 m	401 ft		Chimney	Szczecin/Słoneczne	53°22′24″N 14°40′31″E	
Chimney Tarnowskie Góry	122 m	400 ft		Chimney	Tarnowskie Góry	50°27′50″N 18°49′42″E	
Chimney Pabianice	121 m	397 ft		Chimney	Pabianice	51°40′21″N 19°22′07″E	
Babka Tower	121 m	397 ft		Skyscraper	Warsaw	52°15′17″N 20°59′10″E	
Chimney Koszalin	121 m	397 ft		Chimney	Koszalin	54°10′35″N 16°10′24″E	
Łomianki pylon of Nowodwory-Łomianki Vistula Powerline Crossing	121 m	397 ft	?	Electricity pylon	Łomianki	52°19′33.65″N 20°55′16.85″E	
Kamieńsk Wind turbines	121 m	397 ft	?	Wind turbines	Kamieńsk	51°12′22″N 19°26′02″E; 51°12′33″N 19°26′23″E; 51°12′34″N 19°25′59″E; 51°12′38″N 19°25′39″E; 51°12′47″N 19°25′22″E; 51°12′47″N 19°26′05″E; 51°12′50″N 19°26′27″E; 51°12′58″N 19°25′37″E; 51°13′05″N 19°25′16″E; 51°13′05″N 19°26′26″E; 51°13′09″N 19°25′59″E; 51°13′12″N 19°25′38″E; 51°13′19″N 19°26′13″E; 51°13′20″N 19°25′10″E; 51°13′25″N 19°25′39″E	15 units
Chimney 1 of Siekierki Heat Power Station	129 m	394 ft	1961	Chimney	Warsaw-Siekierki	52°11′29.17″N 21°5′20.91″E	
Sucha Góra TV Tower	120 m	394 ft	1962	Concrete tower	Sucha Góra, Subcarpathian Voivodeship	49°45′23″N 21°48′56″E	
Cooling Towers of Rybnik Power Station	120 m	394 ft		Cooling tower	Rybnik	50°07′58.85″N 18°31′42.47″E; 50°08′0.93″N 18°31′49.65″E	Two towers
Chimney Koksownia Radlin	120 m	394 ft	2007	Chimney	Radlin, Silesian Voivodeship	50°2′21″N 18°29′15″E	
Chimney Bielsko-Biała	120 m	394 ft		Chimney	Bielsko-Biała	49°49′00″N 19°03′00″E (approximate)	
Chimney Jastrzębie Zdrój-Moszczenica	120 m	394 ft		Chimney	Jastrzębie Zdrój-Moszczenica	49°56′29″N 18°34′14″E	
Chimney Skawina	120 m	394 ft		Chimney	Skawina	49°58′4″N 19°47′47″E; 49°58′8″N 19°47′45″E	Two chimneys
Chimney Tychy-Lędziny	120 m	394 ft		Chimney	Tychy	50°07′29″N 19°07′51″E	
Chimney Inowrocław	120 m	394 ft		Chimney	Inowrocław	52°46′02″N 18°14′26″E	
Chimney Gorzów Wielkopolski	120 m	394 ft		Chimney	Gorzów Wielkopolski	52°44′43″N 15°08′07″E	
Chimney Dąbrowa Górnicza-Łosień	120 m	394 ft		Chimney	Dąbrowa Górnicza-Łosień	50°20′31″N 19°20′25″E	
Chimney Trzebinia	120 m	394 ft		Chimney	Trzebinia	50°09′01″N 19°27′17″E	
Chimney of Power Station Białystok	120 m	394 ft		Chimney	Białystok	53°08′53″N 23°10′11″E	
Chimney Sandomierz	120 m	394 ft		Chimney	Sandomierz, Świętokrzyskie Voivodeship	50°39′51″N 21°44′42″E	
Chimney of ZWAR Warsaw-Międzylesie	120 m	394 ft		Chimney	Warsaw-Międzylesie	52°12′33″N 21°10′15″E	
Chimneys of Ożarów Cement Plant	120 m	394 ft		Chimney	Ożarów,Świętokrzyskie Voivodeship	50°56′00″N 21°41′00″E (approximate)	Two chimneys
Chimney Opole-Groszowice	120 m	394 ft		Chimney	Opole-Groszowice	50°36′04″N 17°57′55″E	
Chimney Legnica	120 m	394 ft		Chimney	Legnica	51°14′6″N 16°11′26″E	
Chimney Głogów	120 m	394 ft		Chimney	Głogów	51°41′8″N 15°59′13″E	
Makarki Directional Radio Tower	120 m	394 ft		Partially guyed tower	Makarki	52°32′56″N 22°46′7″E	Free-standing tower with guyed mast on top
Chimneys of EC-2 Łódź Power Plant	120 m	394 ft	1957	Chimney	Łódź	51°44′29.63″N 19°26′55.78″E; 51°44′31.09″N 19°26′53.1″E	Two chimneys
Chimney of Łódź EC-3 Power Plant	120 m	394 ft	1969	Chimney	Łódź	51°47′34.03″N 19°25′14.66″E	
Chimney Konin-Gosławice	120 m	394 ft		Chimney	Konin-Gosławice	52°17′01″N 18°16′08″E	
Chimney Krapkowice	120 m	394 ft		Chimney	Krapkowice	50°32′06″N 17°58′43″E; 50°32′06″N 17°58′48″E	Two chimneys
Chimney Police	120 m	394 ft		Chimney	Police	53°33′14″N 14°33′43″E	
Chimney of Power Station Gdańsk	120 m	394 ft		Chimney	Gdańsk	54°22′40″N 18°38′34″E; 54°22′41″N 18°38′31″E	Two chimneys
Chimney Koszalin	120 m	394 ft		Chimney	Koszalin	54°11′46″N 16°09′33″E	
Chimney Suwałki	120 m	394 ft		Chimney	Suwałki	54°06′17″N 22°58′01″E	
Chimney Tczew	120 m	394 ft		Chimney	Tczew	54°04′56″N 18°44′37″E	
Wind turbines Zagórze	120 m	394 ft		Wind turbine	Zagórze	53°47′41″N 14°38′32″E; 53°47′44″N 14°37′23″E; 53°47′47″N 14°38′12″E; 53°47′50″N 14°37′41″E; 53°47′56″N 14°38′28″E; 53°47′57″N 14°38′00″E; 53°47′57″N 14°37′24″E; 53°48′05″N 14°37′42″E; 53°48′10″N 14°38′28″E; 53°48′10″N 14°38′06″E; 53°48′11″N 14°37′22″E; 53°48′18″N 14°37′42″E; 53°48′21″N 14°38′17″E; 53°48′31″N 14°37′47″E; 53°48′34″N 14°38′10″E	16 Units
Wind turbines Kopan, Cisowo	120 m	394 ft		Wind turbine	Kopan, Cisowo	54°26′51″N 16°25′34″E; 54°26′40″N 16°25′08″E; 54°26′48″N 16°24′54″E; 54°26′58″N 16°25′13″E; 54°27′00″N 16°25′44″E; 54°27′10″N 16°25′52″E; 54°27′11″N 16°25′00″E; 54°27′19″N 16°25′34″E; 54°27′21″N 16°25′13″E	Nine units
Błękitny Skyscraper	120 m	394 ft	1991	Skyscraper	Warsaw	52°14′38″N 21°0′9″E	
The Westin Warsaw	120 m	394 ft	2003	Skyscraper	Warsaw	52°14′7″N 20°59′48″E	
Lucka City	120 m	394 ft	2004	Skyscraper	Warsaw	52°13′54″N 20°59′17″E	
Hotel Orbis Szczecin	119 m	390 ft		Skyscraper	Szczecin	53°25′59″N 14°33′26″E	
Chimney of Gdańsk oil refinery	119 m	390 ft		Chimney	Gdańsk	54°20′44″N 18°44′13″E	
Chimney Bukowno	117 m	384 ft		Chimney	Bukowno	50°16′32″N 19°28′33″E	
Chimney Iława	117 m	384 ft		Chimney	Iława	53°35′00″N 19°34′35″E	
Chimney Ciechanów	117 m	384 ft		Chimney	Ciechanów	52°51′23″N 20°36′20″E	
Power line crossings in Poland, Lubaniew-Bobrowniki Vistula Powerline Crossing	117 m	384 ft	?	Electricity pylon	Lubaniew/Bobrowniki	51°30′10.8″N 21°50′45.96″E; 51°30′10.41″N 21°51′37.48″E	
Chimney of Czechnica Heat&Power Station	116 m	381 ft		Chimney	Siechnice	51°02′16.86″N 17°09′1.07″E	
Chimney Ożarów Cement Plant	116 m	381 ft		Chimney	Ożarów	50°55′50″N 21°40′44″E	
Mrągowo Radio Tower	116 m	381 ft		Tower	Mrągowo	53°51′53″N 21°17′43″E	
Power line crossings in Poland,Świerże Górne-Rybaków Vistula Powerline Crossing	116 m	381 ft	?	Electricity pylon	Świerże Górne/Rybaków	51°40′1.94″N 21°29′50.22″E; 51°39′29.07″N 21°29′56.01″E	
Transmitter Heilsberg, Wood radio tower	115 m	377 ft	1935	Wooden lattice tower	Lidzbark Warmiński	54°08′24″N 20°33′46″E	Demolished in 1940 (Lidzbark Warmiński was a German city at those days)
Jagodnik transmitter	115 m	377 ft		Lattice tower	Elbląg-Jagodnik, Warmian Masurian Voivodeship	54°12′24″N 19°29′36″E	
Chimney Zabrze-Biskupice	115 m	377 ft		Chimney	Zabrze-Biskupice	50°20′00″N 18°50′00″E (approximate)	
Ostrówek-Tursko Vistula Powerline Crossing	115 m	377 ft	?	Electricity pylon	Ostrówek/Tursko	50°26′29.17″N 21°21′3.85″E; 50°26′5.21″N 21°21′27.72″E	
Gołogóra transmitter, Mast 2	115 m	377 ft		Guyed mast	Gołogóra, West Pomeranian voivodeship	54°0′14.26″N 16°44′15.46″E	
ORCO Tower	115 m	377 ft	1996	Skyscraper	Warsaw	52°13′37″N 21°0′7″E	
Chimney of Kielce Power Station	114 m	374 ft		Chimney	Kielce	50°53′45″N 20°36′44″E	
Warszewo transmitter	114 m	374 ft		Guyed mast	Szczecin	53°28′30″N 14°32′37″E	
Gliwice Radio Tower	112 m	367 ft		Wooden lattice tower	Gliwice, Silesian Voivodeship	50°18′48.12″N 18°41′20.26″E	Height in the first decade of the 21st century until the removal of the antenna mast on the top in 2013 118 metres
Probostwo Dolne pylon of Nowy Bógpomóż-Probostwo Dolne Vistula Powerline Crossing	111 m	364 ft	?	Electricity pylon	Nowy Bógpomóż/Probostwo Dolne	52°46′10.39″N 18°57′46.73″E	
Novotel Warsaw Centrum	111 m	364 ft	1974	Skyscraper	Warsaw	52°13′45″N 21°0′48″E	
St. James Cathedral	110.2 m	361.55 ft	13th century	Church	Szczecin		The second tallest church in Poland
Szczecin Cathedral	110.18 m	361 ft		Church	Szczecin	53°25′28.61″N 14°33′20.11″E	
FIM Tower	110 m	361 ft		Skyscraper	Warsaw	52°13′59″N 20°59′53″E	
Chimney Ruda Śląska-Halemba	110 m	361 ft		Chimney	Ruda Śląska-Halemba	50°14′00″N 18°51′00″E (approximate)	
Chimney Ozorków	110 m	361 ft		Chimney	Ozorków	51°58′23″N 19°16′56″E	
Chimney Słupsk?	110 m	361 ft		Chimney	Słupsk	54°27′10″N 17°00′40″E	
Chimney Trzemieśno	110 m	361 ft		Chimney	Trzemieśno	52°33′50″N 17°48′55″E	
Chimney Wyszków	110 m	361 ft		Chimney	Wyszków, Masovian Voivodeship	52°36′55″N 21°26′58″E	Demolished or never built
Chimney Włocławek	110 m	361 ft		Chimney	Włocławek	52°39′37″N 19°02′55″E	
Chimneys of Zeran Heat Power Station	110 m	361 ft		Chimney	Warsaw-Żerań	52°17′42″N 20°59′40″E; 52°17′44″N 20°59′43″E	Two chimneys
Bytków TV Tower	110 m	361 ft		Concrete tower	Katowice/Bytków	50°17′43″N 19°0′17″E	
Andersia Tower	110 m	361 ft	2007	Skyscraper	Poznań	52°24′3″N 16°55′33″E	
Transmitter Koszęcin, FM-Mast	110 m	361 ft		Guyed mast	Koszęcin	50°39′8″N 18°51′36″E	
Radojewice Radio Tower	110 m	361 ft		Tower	Radojewice	52°44′23″N 18°25′29″E	
Lublin University Building	110 m	361 ft		Skyscraper	Lublin	51°14′43″N 22°32′26″E	
Nowy Bógpomóż pylon of Nowy Bógpomóż-Probostwo Dolne Vistula Powerline Crossing	109 m	358 ft	?	Electricity pylon	Nowy Bógpomóż	52°45′50.43″N 18°56′48.88″E	
Regów Gołąb Vistula Powerline Crossing	108 m	354 ft	?	Electricity pylon	Regów Stary/Gołąb	51°30′13.39″N 21°50′46.88″E; 51°30′13.05″N 21°51′38.74″E	
Chimney of Chorzów Power Station	108 m	354 ft		Chimney	Chorzów	50°18′36″N 18°58′6″E	
Chimney Tarnobrzeg	108 m	354 ft		Chimney	Tarnobrzeg	50°31′27″N 21°38′16″E	
Górki Duże transmitter	108 m	354 ft		Guyed mast?	Górki Duże	51°33′51″N 19°31′9″E	
Łowicz Radio Tower	107 m	351 ft		Lattice tower	Łowicz	52°6′59″N 19°56′36″E	
Monte Cassino Radio Tower	107 m	351 ft		Lattice tower	Ciechanów	52°52′18.78″N 20°34′48.85″E	
Jasna Góra Monastery	106.3 m	349 ft		Church	Częstochowa	50°48′44.75″N 19°05′49.46″E	The most important place of pilgrimage in Poland
SLR Piotrków	106 m	348 ft		Lattice tower	Piotrków	51°3′22″N 22°38′59″E	
Iglica	106 m	348 ft		Concrete tower	Wrocław	51°6′27″N 17°4′32″E	Height was reduced to 96 metres
Chimney of Power Station Toruń	106 m	348 ft		Chimney	Toruń	53°02′24″N 18°40′00″E	
eR Piotrków	105 m	344 ft		tower	Piotrków Pierwszy-Lublin	51°03′22″N 22°39′00″E	
Boży Dar transmitter, MW-Mast	105 m	344 ft		Guyed mast	Boży Dar	51°0′9.31″N 22°39′20.7″E	Insulated against ground
Chimney Wodzisław Śląski-Pszów	105 m	344 ft		Chimney	Wodzisław Śląski-Pszów	50°02′42″N 18°23′42″E	
Cooling towers of Turów Power Station	105 m	344 ft		Cooling Tower	Turów	50°56′58.78″N 14°54′14.13″E; 50°56′55.09″N 14°54′14.27″E; 50°56′57.89″N 14°54′20.35″E; 50°56′59.87″N 14°54′28.56″E; 50°57′0.1″N 14°54′35.14″E; 50°56′57.72″N 14°54′57.27″E; 50°56′55.54″N 14°55′2.93″E; 50°56′52.43″N 14°54′58.05″E	
Olsztyn Radio Tower	105 m	344 ft		Lattice tower	Olsztyn/Track	53°46′58″N 20°31′59″E	
Gorzków Wieś Radio Tower	105 m	344 ft		Tower	Gorzków Wieś	50°57′44″N 22°58′41″E	
Chimney Dzików	105 m	344 ft		Chimney	Dzików	50°35′00″N 16°35′00″E (approximate)	
Chimney of old Konstilana works	105 m	344 ft		Chimney	Konstantynów Łódzki	51°44′50″N 19°18′01″E	
Boży Dar transmitter, Mast 2	105 m	344 ft		Guyed mast	Boży Dar	51°0′9″N 22°39′20″E	Insulated against ground
Sowlany transmitter	105 m	344 ft		Guyed mast	Sowlany	53°9′2″N 23°16′8″E	Used until 1998 for medium wave broadcasting
Biurowiec Wojewódzki	105 m	344 ft	1985	Skyscraper	Katowice	50°14′50″N 19°0′56″E	
Babka Tower	105 m	344 ft	2000	Skyscraper	Warsaw	52°15′14″N 20°59′3″E	
Złote Tarasy	105 m	344 ft	2007	Skyscraper	Warsaw	52°13′50″N 21°0′12″E	
Cracovia Business Center	105 m	344 ft	1998	Skyscraper	Kraków	50°3′26″N 19°57′39″E	
Chimney KWK Rydułtowy Anna	105 m	344 ft		Chimney	Wodzisław Śląski-Pszów	50°02′42″N 18°23′41″E	
Łódź Cathedral	104.5 m	343 ft	1912	Church	Łódź	51°44′56.34″N 19°27′36.84″E	
Gozd Radio Tower	104 m	341 ft		Lattice tower	Gozd	50°58′57″N 20°44′47″E	
Collegium Altum w Poznaniu	104 m	341 ft	1991	Skyscraper	Poznań	52°24′17″N 16°55′17″E	
Raabego TV Tower	104 m	341 ft		Concrete tower	Lublin	51°14′38″N 22°32′42″E	
St. Stanislaus and St. Wenceslaus Cathedral	103 m	338 ft	1565	Church	Świdnica	50°50′27.63″N 16°29′29.7″E	The oldest structure in Poland exceeding 100 metres
Chimney of Cementownia Grodziec	103 m	338 ft		Chimney	Będzin-Grodziec	50°21′15″N 19°05′15″E	
Chimney Fasty	103 m	338 ft		Chimney	Fasty	53°09′43″N 23°04′54″E	
Gorzów Wielkopolski Provincial Office Building	103 m	338 ft		Skyscraper with antenna mast	Gorzów Wielkopolski	52°44′20″N 15°13′46″E	
Ilmet	103 m	338 ft	1997	Skyscraper	Warsaw	52°13′55″N 20°59′52″E	
Third Millennium Bridge	103 m	338 ft	2001	Bridge	Gdańsk	54°21′19.65″N 18°41′40.71″E	
Chojna Maria Church	102.6 m	335 ft	1854	Church	Chojna	52°57′45.57″N 14°25′45.92″E	
Transmitter Heilsberg, Towers of T-antenna	102 m	335 ft	1930	Wooden lattice tower	Lidzbark Warmiński	54°08′24″N 20°33′46″E	Two towers; demolished in 1935 (Lidzbark Warmiński was a German city at those days)
Zakopane-Gubałówka transmitter	102 m	335 ft		Lattice tower	Zakopane	49°18′28″N 19°56′10″E	
Zakrowski Chimney	102 m	335 ft		Chimney	Wrocław	51°09′37.09″N 17°07′6.29″E	
Chimney of Wujek Coal Mine	102 m	335 ft		Chimney	Katowice	50°14′39″N 18°59′20″E	
RCTN Białystok (Krynice), Mast 2	102 m	335 ft	1962/1996	Guyed mast	Krynice	53°13′52.84″N 23°1′34.23″E	Tower was originally 262 m tall until 1996
SLR Włodawa	102 m	335 ft		Lattice tower	Włodawa	51°33′12.38″N 23°32′12.92″E	
Ascension Church in Bielawa	101 m	331 ft	1876	Church	Bielawa	50°42′39.89″N 16°34′50.28″E	
Chimney Wrocław	101 m	331 ft		Chimney	Wrocław	51°07′37″N 17°05′58″E	Demolished or never built
SLR Żelechlinek	101 m	331 ft		Lattice tower	Żelechlinek	51°42′30″N 20°02′08″E	
Chimney of Power Station Poznań-Garbary	100 m	328 ft	1929	Chimney	Poznań-Garbary	52°24′57″N 16°56′40″E	
Chimney at Nowy Sącz-Biegonice	100 m	328 ft		Chimney	Nowy Sącz-Biegonice	49°35′00″N 20°40′08″E	
Chimney at Skoczów	100 m	328 ft		Chimney	Skoczów	49°47′00″N 18°47′00″E (approximate)	
Chimney of Tereny Power Station	100 m	328 ft		Chimney	Bielsko-Biała	49°52′24″N 19°01′46″E	
Chimney of Polar S.A.	100 m	328 ft		Chimney	Wrocław		Demolished in 2004
Chimney Niedomice	100 m	328 ft		Chimney	Niedomice	50°06′25″N 20°53′59″E	
Chimney Z. Ch. Bonarka	100 m	328 ft		Chimney	Kraków	50°01′35″N 19°57′07″E	
Chimney Mysłowice-Wesoła	100 m	328 ft		Chimney	Mysłowice	50°10′52″N 19°06′20″E	
Chimney Leżajsk	100 m	328 ft		Chimney	Leżajsk	50°19′00″N 22°09′00″E (approximate)	
Chimney Bytom-Miechowice	100 m	328 ft		Chimney	Bytom-Miechowice	50°21′00″N 18°50′00″E (approximate)	
Chimney Klucze	100 m	328 ft		Chimney	Klucze	50°21′06″N 19°33′28″E	
Chimney Tarnobrzeg	100 m	328 ft		Chimney	Tarnobrzeg	50°35′06″N 21°50′33″E	
Chimney Opole	100 m	328 ft		Chimney	Opole	50°40′30″N 17°59′30″E	
Chimney Kostrzyca	100 m	328 ft		Chimney	Kostrzyca	50°49′00″N 15°48′00″E (approximate)	
Chimney Ostrowiec Świętokrzyski	100 m	328 ft		Chimney	Ostrowiec Świętokrzyski	50°56′56″N 21°26′45″E	
Różniatów Radio Tower	100 m	328 ft		Lattice tower	Różniatów	50°30′1″N 18°14′53″E	
Górażdże Cement Plant	100 m	328 ft		3 concrete towers	Górażdże	50°32′8″N 17°58′45″E	
Jędrzejów Radio Tower	100 m	328 ft		Lattice tower	Jędrzejów,Świętokrzyskie Voivodeship	50°37′23″N 20°18′53″E	
Osmolin Radio Tower	100 m	328 ft		Lattice tower	Osmolin	52°18′0″N 19°49′54″E	
RTON Kobyłka	100 m	328 ft		Guyed mast	Kobyłka	52°21′3″N 21°9′21″E	
Radom longwave transmitter	100 m	328 ft		Guyed mast	Radom	51°24′30″N 21°7′6″E; 51°24′40″N 21°7′13″E; 51°24′39″N 21°6′56″E	Three masts
Gorzów Wielkopolski Radio Tower	100 m	328 ft		Lattice tower	Gorzów Wielkopolski	52°44′15″N 15°16′34″E	
Chimney Chełm Lubelski	100 m	328 ft		Chimney	Chełm Lubelski	51°08′55″N 23°29′43″E	
Chimney Brzeg Dolny	100 m	328 ft		Chimney	Brzeg Dolny	51°16′00″N 16°44′00″E (approximate)	
Chimney Rudna	100 m	328 ft		Chimney	Rudna	51°29′51″N 16°06′39″E; 51°29′53″N 16°06′38″E || Two chimneys	
Chimney Tomaszów Mazowiecki	100 m	328 ft		Chimney	Tomaszów Mazowiecki	51°32′52″N 20°02′42″E; 51°33′01″N 20°02′26″E	
Chimney Zgierz	100 m	328 ft		Chimney	Zgierz	51°50′28″N 19°23′40″E	
Chimney Cigacice	100 m	328 ft		Chimney	Cigacice	52°02′34″N 15°35′54″E; 52°02′34″N 15°36′00″E	Two chimneys
Chimney Żyrardów	100 m	328 ft		Chimney	Żyrardów	52°03′11″N 20°26′14″E	
Chimney Włocławek	100 m	328 ft		Chimney	Włocławek	52°39′06″N 19°05′56″E	
Chimney Kruszwica	100 m	328 ft		Chimney	Kruszwica	52°40′45″N 18°19′07″E	
Chimney Glinojeck	100 m	328 ft		Chimney	Glinojeck	52°50′26″N 20°15′53″E	
Chimney Ujscie	100 m	328 ft		Chimney	Ujście	53°03′17″N 16°43′24″E	
Chimney of Power Station Bydgoszcz-Jachcice	100 m	328 ft		Chimney	Bydgoszcz-Jachcice	53°08′09″N 17°59′00″E	
Surąż Lewy Radio Tower	100 m	328 ft		Lattice tower	Surąż Lewy	52°56′3″N 22°57′3″E	
Stramnica Radio Tower	100 m	328 ft		Lattice tower	Stramnica	54°8′55″N 15°38′13″E; 54°8′55″N 15°38′17″E	Two towers
Chimney Konin-Gosławice	100 m	328 ft		Chimney	Konin-Gosławice	52°17′05″N 18°16′03″E; 52°17′05″N 18°16′07″E; 52°17′05″N 18°16′09″E	Three chimneys
Chimney Leszno-Zatorze	100 m	328 ft		Chimney	Leszno-Zatorze	51°51′43″N 16°33′49″E	
Chimney of Power Station Szczecin-Pomorzany	100 m	328 ft		Chimney	Szczecin-Pomorzany	53°23′28″N 14°31′29″E	
Chimney Świecie	100 m	328 ft		Chimney	Świecie	53°23′38″N 18°22′34″E; 53°23′39″N 18°22′34″E	Two chimneys
Chimney Słupsk	100 m	328 ft		Chimney	Słupsk	54°27′12″N 17°00′07″E	
Kończyce Meteorological Mast	100 m	328 ft		Guyed mast	Kończyce	50°51′50.51″N 17°7′39.32″E	
PAZIM	100 m	328 ft		Skyscraper	Szczecin	53°25′56.12″N 014°33′21.77″E	
Chimney KWK 1 Maja Wodzisław Śląski	100 m	328 ft		Chimney	Wodzisław Śląski	49°58′44″N 18°29′41″E	

== See also ==
- List of tallest buildings in Poland
