= Piaski transmitter =

Lublin/Piaski Transmitter
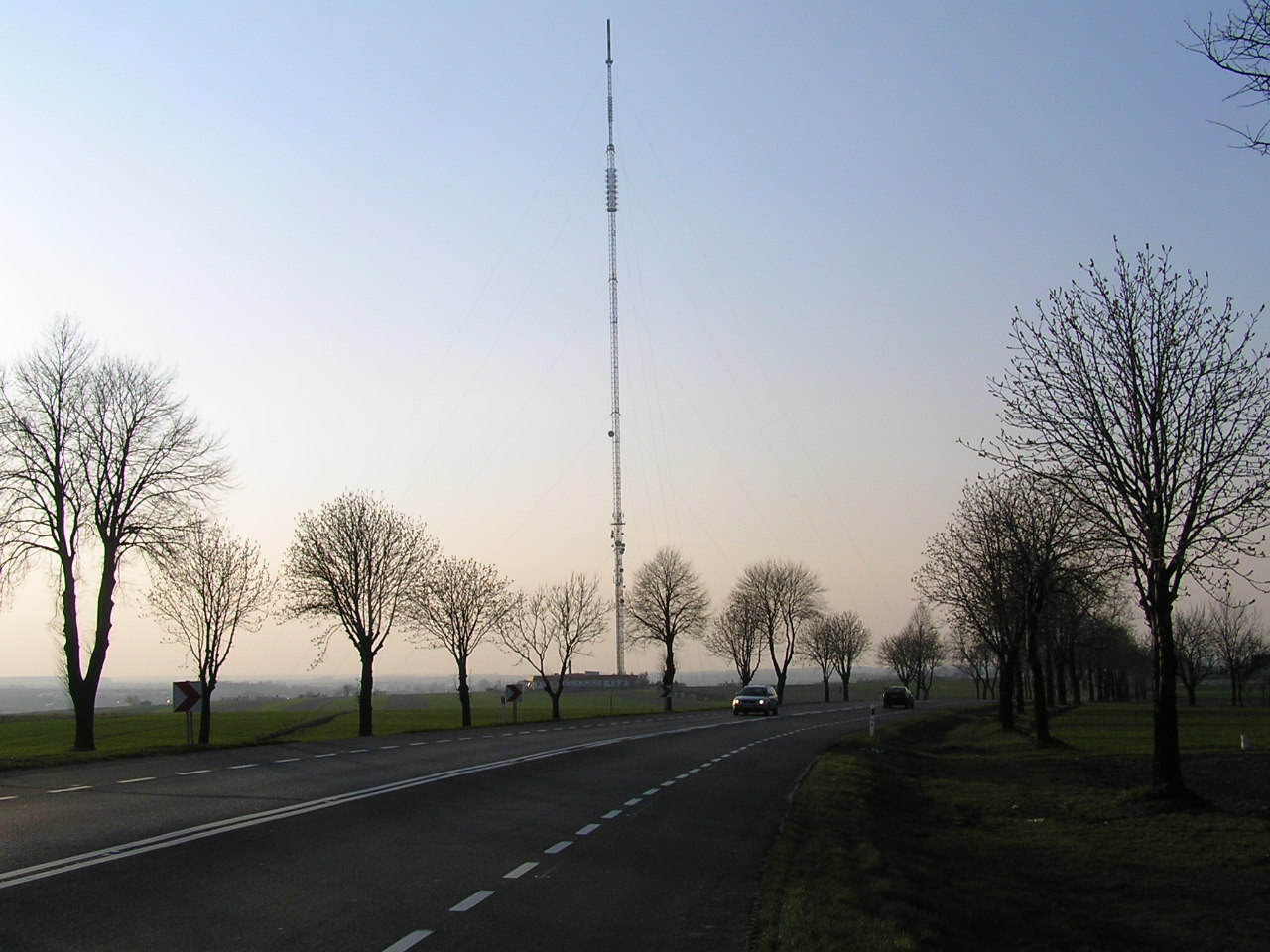
- Interactive map of the Lublin/Piaski Transmitter area

General information
- Status: Completed
- Type: Mast
- Location: Piaski (Lubelskie Voivodeship)
- Completed: 1990

Height
- Height: 342 m (1,122.05 ft)

Piaski Transmitter
- Coordinates: 51°08′02″N 22°52′11″E

The Piaski transmitter ( Polish: Radiowo Telewizyjne Centrum Nadawcze Lublin / Piaski or short RTCN Piaski) is a facility for FM- and TV-broadcasting near Piaski in Lublin Voivodeship, Poland at 51°08′02″N 22°52′11″E. The Piaski transmitter uses a 342-metre-tall (1,122 ft) guyed mast antenna tower, which was built in 1990. After the collapse of the Warsaw Radio Mast the Piaski transmitter became the 4th tallest structure of Poland.

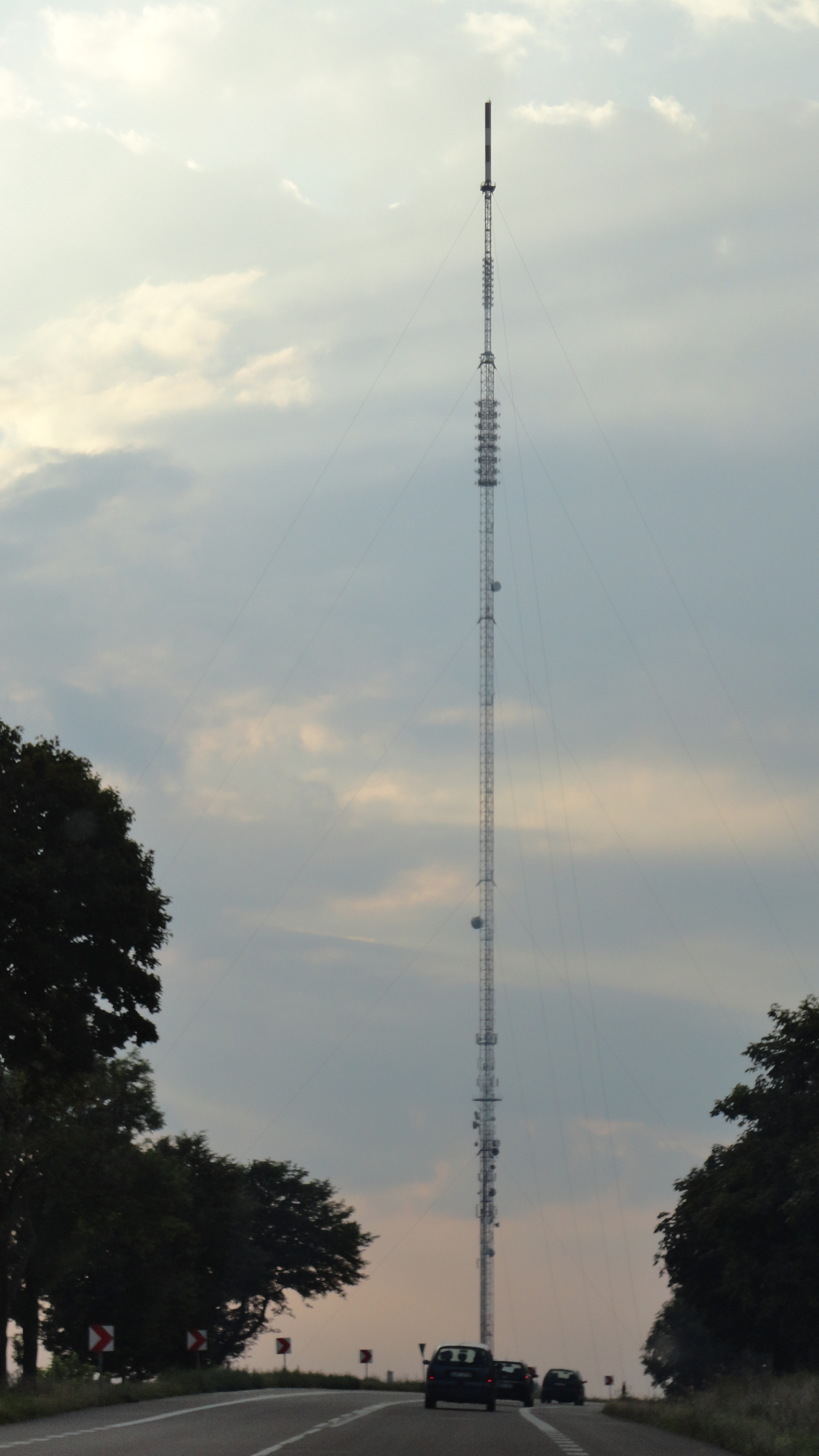
Radio and Television mast in Piaski

The following programmes are transmitted by Piaski transmitter.

== Transmitted programmes ==
=== Digital television MPEG-4 ===
Multiplex Number	Programme in Multiplex	Frequency	Channel	Power ERP	Polarisation	Antenna Diagram	Modulation
MUX 1	TVP1; Stopklatka TV; TVP ABC; TV Trwam; Eska TV; TTV; Polo TV; ATM Rozrywka	570 MHz	33	100 kW	Horizontal	ND	64 QAM
MUX 2	Polsat; TVN; TV4; TV Puls; TVN 7; Puls 2; TV6; Polsat Sport News	474 MHz	21	100 kW	Horizontal	ND	64 QAM
MUX 3	TVP1 HD; TVP2 HD; TVP Lublin; TVP Kultura; TVP Historia; TVP Polonia; TVP Rozrywka; TVP Info	490 MHz	23	100 kW	Horizontal	ND	64 QAM

== FM radio ==
Radio
Program	Frequency	ERP
RMF FM Radio Muzyka Fakty Sp. z o.o.	89,30 MHz	30 kW
PR2 Polskie Radio S.A.	90,80 MHz	30 kW
Radio Lublin Polskie Radio - Regionalna Rozgłośnia w Lublinie "Radio Lublin" S.A.	102,20 MHz	90 kW
PR3 Polskie Radio S.A.	104,20 MHz	90 kW

== See also ==
- List of masts
- List of tallest structures in Poland
