= Limża/Kisielice Transmitter =

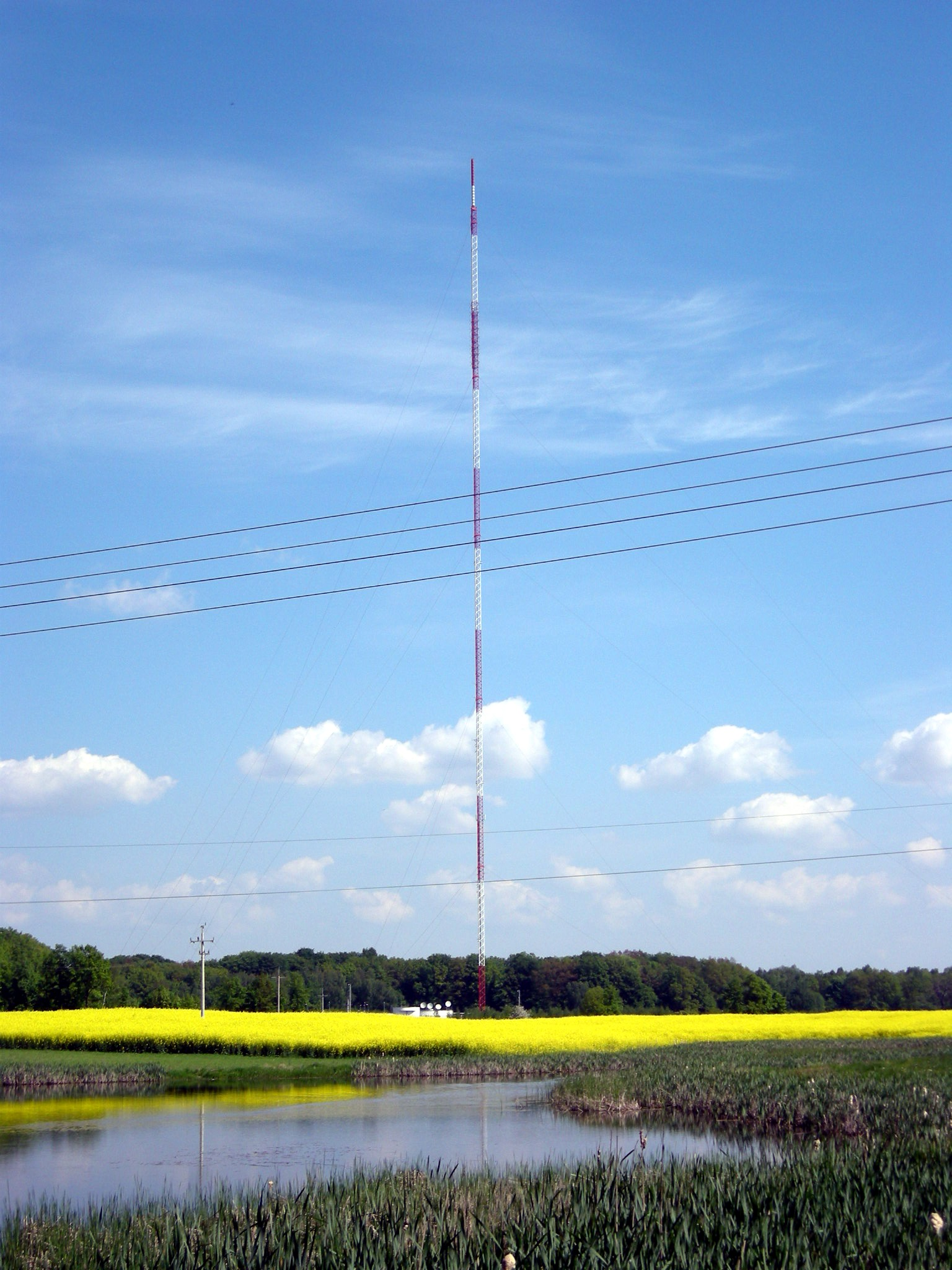
- Interactive map of the Limża/Kisielice Transmitter area

General information
- Status: Completed
- Type: TV-Mast
- Location: Limża, Poland
- Completed: January 2002

Height
- Height: 320 m (1,049.87 ft)

Limża Transmitter
- Coordinates: 53°36′50″N 19°13′16″E

FM/TV Limża Transmitter is a 320 Broadcasting Transmitting Centre in Limża, Poland.

== Transmitted programmes ==
=== Digital television MPEG-4 ===
Multiplex Number	Programme in Multiplex	Frequency	Channel	Power ERP	Polarisation	Antenna Diagram	Modulation
MUX 1	TVP1; Stopklatka TV; TVP ABC; TV Trwam; Eska TV; TTV; Polo TV; ATM Rozrywka	610 MHz	38	100 kW	Horizontal	ND	64 QAM
MUX 2	Polsat; TVN; TV4; TV Puls; TVN 7; Puls 2; TV6; Super Polsat	498 MHz	24	100 kW	Horizontal	ND	64 QAM
MUX 3	TVP1 HD; TVP2 HD; TVP Gdańsk; TVP Kultura; TVP Historia; TVP Polonia; TVP Rozrywka; TVP Info	690 MHz	48	50 kW	Horizontal	ND	64 QAM

=== FM Radio ===
Program	Frequency	Transmission Power	Polarisation	Antenna Diagram
Polskie Radio Program I	94,80 MHz	10 kW	Horizontal	ND
Radio Maryja	96,90 MHz	7,50 kW	Horizontal	ND
Radio ZET	98,70 MHz	10 kW	Horizontal	ND
Polskie Radio Program II	102,70 MHz	10 kW	Horizontal	ND
Polskie Radio Program IV	104,80 MHz	5 kW	Horizontal	ND
RMF FM	107,40 MHz	10 kW	Horizontal	ND

== See also ==
- List of masts
