= Wola Rasztowska transmitter =

Coordinates: 52°26′52″N 21°17′22″E

Wola Rasztowska transmitter (Polish: RCN Wola Rasztowska) was a mediumwave broadcasting facility at Wola Rasztowska near Warsaw in Poland at 21°17' E and 52°27' N. Wola Rasztowska transmitter, which was also known as Warszawa III was receivable until its shutdown on February 1, 1998, on 819 kHz in whole Europe. Wola Rasztowska transmitter went in service on July 22, 1953, and was between 1976 and 1988 an important facility for jamming the mediumwave transmitter of Radio Free Europe. The antenna of Wola Rasztowska transmitter consisted of 2 150 metres tall and 2 200 metres tall guyed masts.

After the shutdown of the facility, the masts were dismantled, but the transmitter building and its surrounding property are still there.

== See also ==
- List of famous transmission sites
- List of tallest structures in Poland
