= Tarnawatka Transmitter =

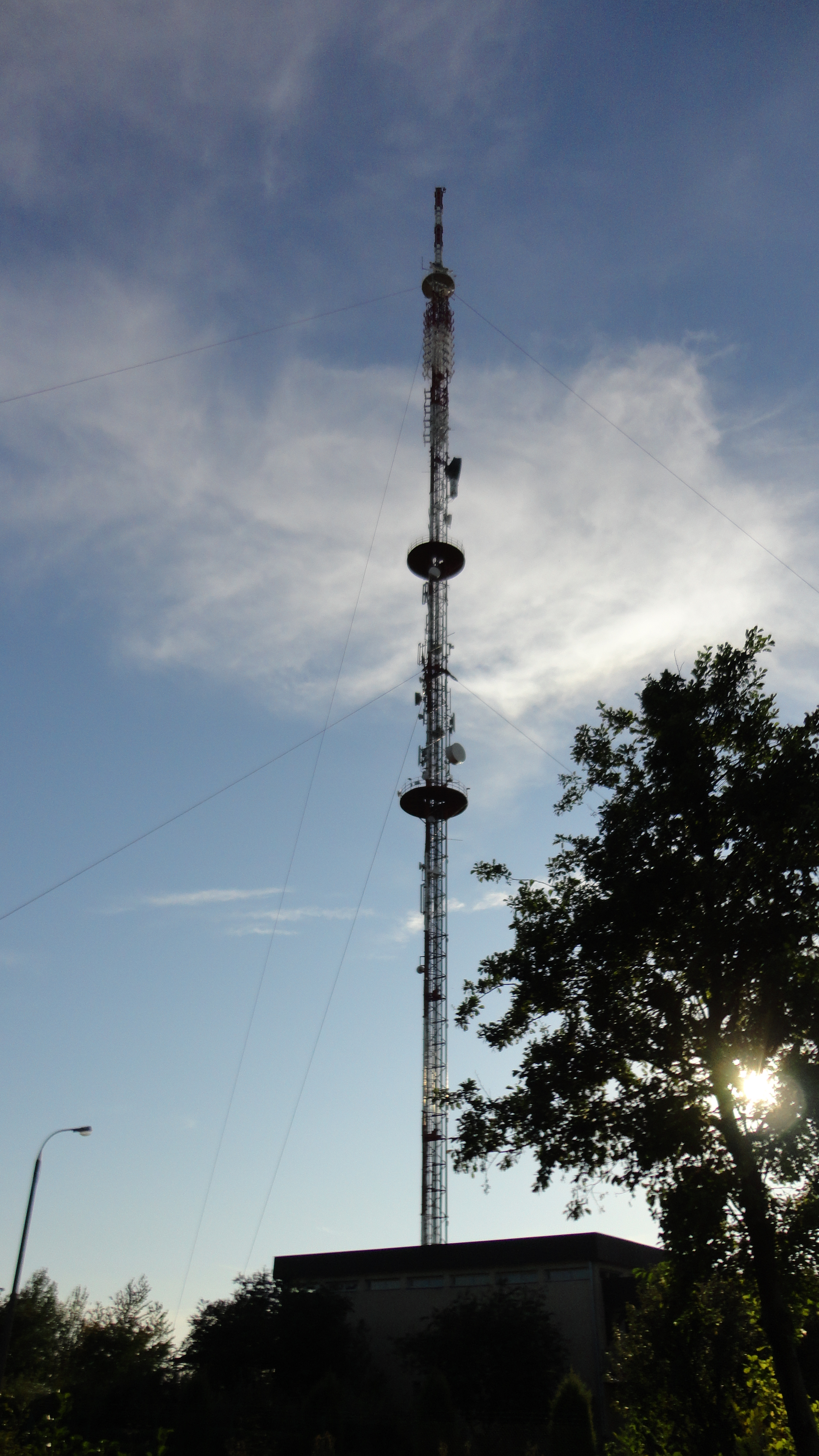
- Interactive map of the Tarnawatka Transmitter area

General information
- Status: Completed
- Type: Mast
- Location: Tarnawatka, Lubelskie Voivodeship
- Completed: 1984

Height
- Height: 154 m (505.25 ft)

Tarnawatka Transmitter
- Coordinates: 50°31′24″N 23°23′50″E

Tarnawatka Transmitter is a radio-television transmitting centre located in the village of Tarnawatka near Zamość. The 154 metre guyed steel mast was built in 1984 in order to provide radio and television coverage in Zamość Voivodeship and the surrounding areas. It is a broadcasting station of about medium powers and reception is also possible in the westmost areas of Ukraine. The transmitter is owned by the EmiTel company.

== Transmitted programmes ==
=== Digital television MPEG-4 ===
| Multiplex Number | Programme in Multiplex | Frequency | Channel | Power ERP | Polarisation | Antenna Diagram | Modulation |
|---|---|---|---|---|---|---|---|
| MUX 1 | TVP1; Stopklatka TV; TVP ABC; TV Trwam; Eska TV; TTV; Polo TV; ATM Rozrywka | 706 MHz | 50 | 50 kW | Horizontal | ND | 64 QAM |
| MUX 2 | Polsat; TVN; TV4; TV Puls; TVN 7; Puls 2; TV6; Polsat Sport News | 730 MHz | 53 | 50 kW | Horizontal | ND | 64 QAM |
| MUX 3 | TVP1 HD; TVP2 HD; TVP Lublin; TVP Kultura; TVP Historia; TVP Polonia; TVP Rozrywka; TVP Info | 594 MHz | 36 | 50 kW | Horizontal | ND | 64 QAM |

== FM radio ==
Radio
| Program | Frequency | ERP |
|---|---|---|
| Polskie Radio Program I | 87,60 MHz | 30 kW |
| Polskie Radio Program III | 91,30 MHz | 30 kW |
| Radio Maryja | 96,50 MHz | 10 kW |
| Polskie Radio Lublin | 103,20 MHz | 30 kW |
| RMF FM | 107,70 MHz | 15 kW |

== See also ==
- Multiplex communication
- List of tallest structures in Poland
