= Kielce Power Station =

Power station in Poland

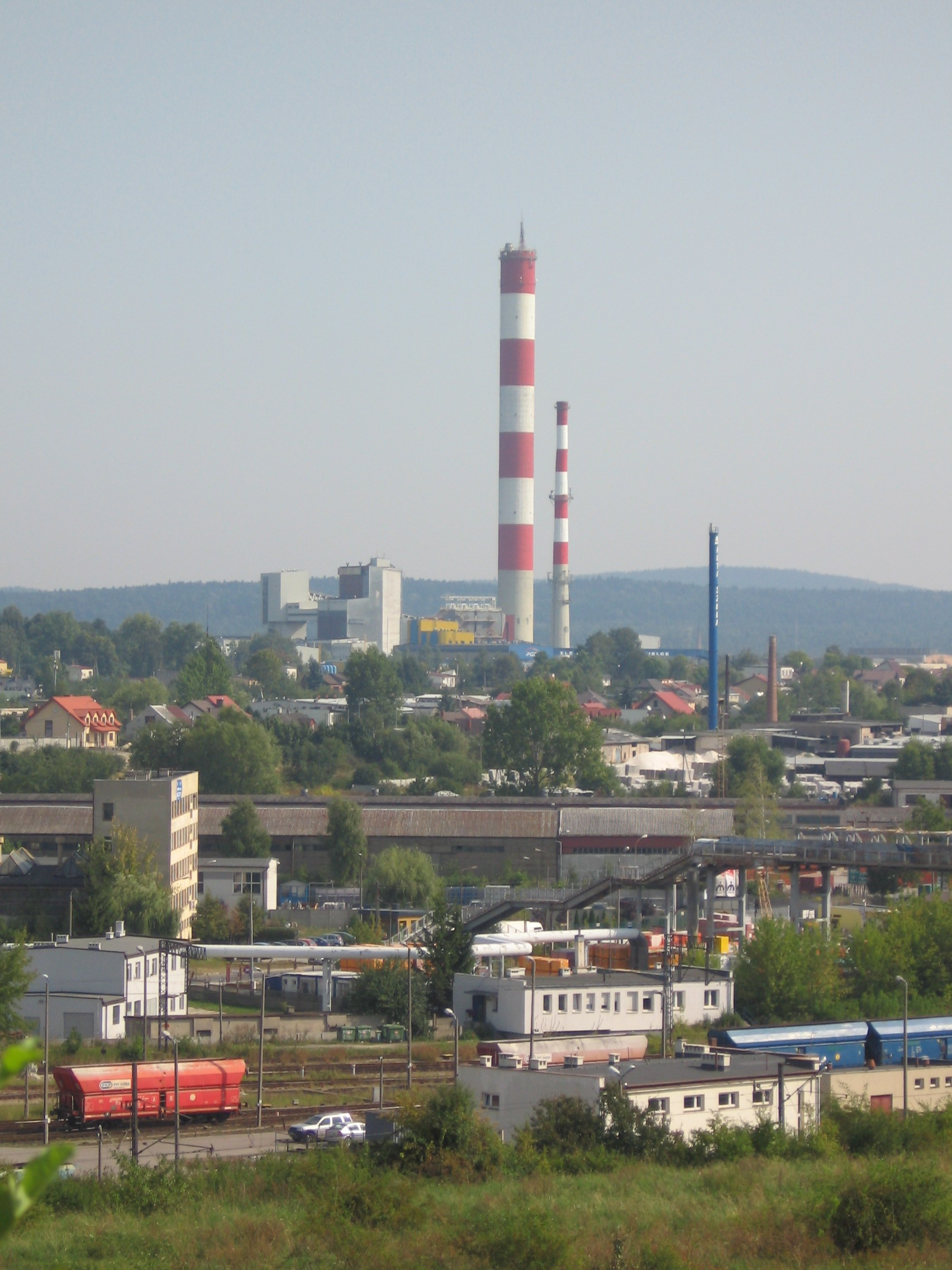
- Official name: Elektrociepłownia Kielce
- Country: Poland
- Location: Kielce
- Coordinates: 50°53′52″N 20°37′0″E
- Status: Operational
- Commission date: 1987
- Owner: PGE

Thermal power station
- Primary fuel: Coal
- Secondary fuel: Biomass
- Cogeneration?: Yes

Power generation
- Units operational: 1 x 140 MW; 6 x 25 MW; 1 x 10 MW
- Nameplate capacity: 300 MW

External links
- Website: www.eckielce.com.pl

Kielce Power Station (Polish: Elektrociepłownia Kielce) is a coal-fired combined power and heat plant at Kielce, Poland. It went operational in 1987 and consists of one 140 MW unit, six 25 MW units and one 10 MW cogeneration unit. It is operated by PGE.

The facility has two flue gas stacks, which are both equipped with telecommunication equipment, whereby the larger chimney, which is 213-metre (699 ft) tall with rooftop antennas (without it is 200-metre (660 ft) tall) is used for FM- and TV-broadcasting. The other chimney is 114-metre (374 ft) tall.

== See also ==
- List of tallest structures in Poland
- List of power stations in Poland
