= Jagodnik transmitter =

Jagodnik transmitter (Polish: RTON Jagodnik) is an FM- and TV-broadcasting facility of TP Emitel near Jagonik, a part of Milejewo community, situated in Warmian-Masurian Voivodeship in Poland at 54°12′28″N 19°29′41″E. Jagodnik transmitter antenna uses a 115-metre-tall (377 ft) lattice tower. Jagodnik transmitter is used for broadcasting the following programmes.

Radio
| Program | Frequency | ERP |
|---|---|---|
| PR4 Polskie Radio S.A. | 101.20 MHz | 0,25 kW |
| PR2 Polskie Radio S.A. | 102.30 MHz | 5 kW |
| Radio Maryja Prowincja Warszawska Zgromadzenia O.O. Redemptorystów | 104.20 MHz | 10 kW |
| Radio Olsztyn Polskie Radio - Regionalna Rozgłośnia w Olsztynie "Radio Olsztyn" S.A. | 103.40 MHz | 0.50 kW |

Digital TV
| Program | Frequency | Channel | ERP |
|---|---|---|---|
| MUX 1 | 650 MHz | 43 | 10 kW |
| MUX 2 | 506 MHz | 25 | 10 kW |
| MUX 3 | 514 MHz | 26 | 4,5 kW |

== See also ==
- List of towers
- List of tallest structures in Poland
