= Gołogóra transmitter =

RTCN Gołogóra
- Location within Poland
- Coordinates: 54°00′15″N 16°44′27″E

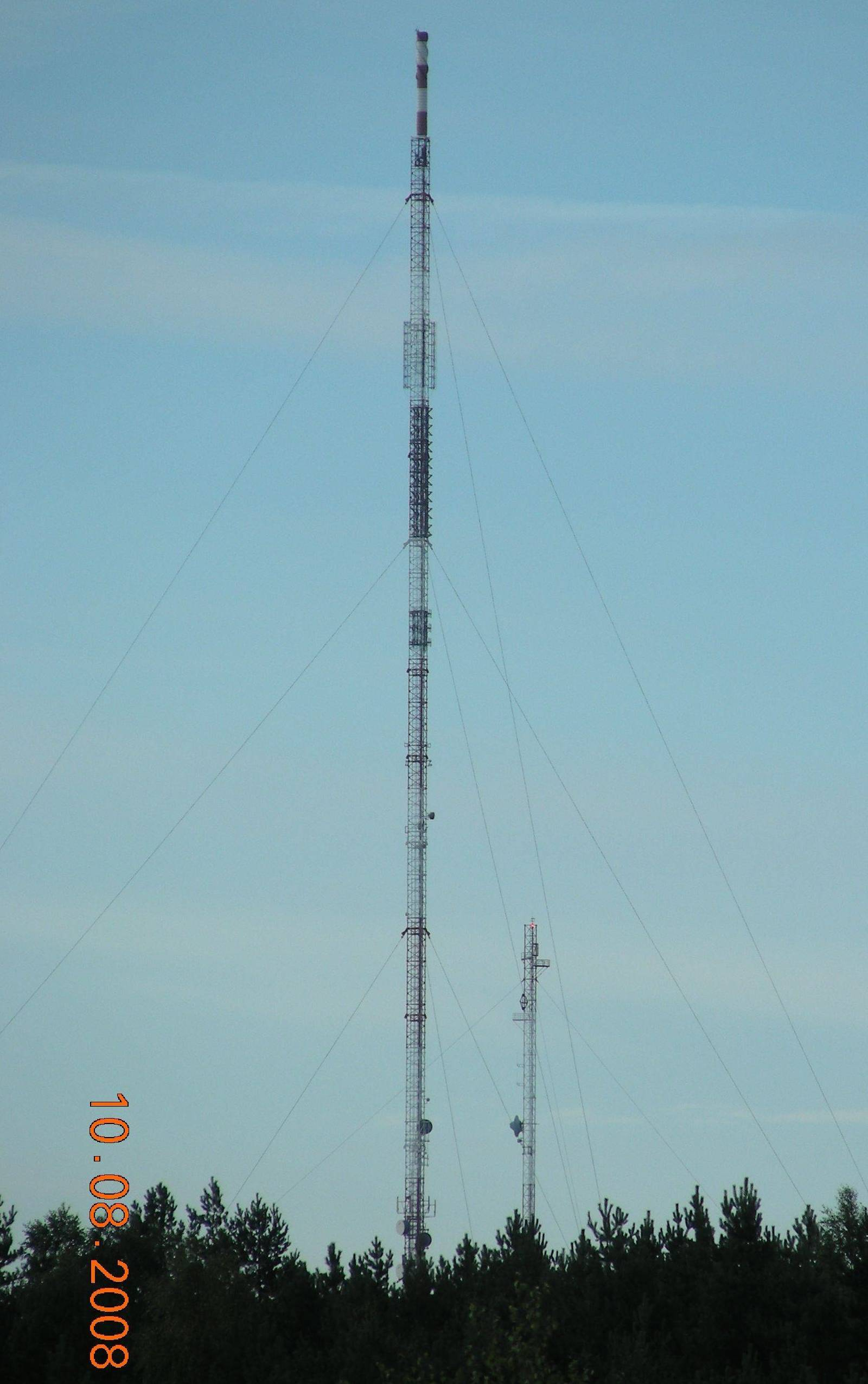
Gołogóra Transmitter

The Gołogóra Transmitter (Polish:RTCN Gołogóra) is a facility for FM radio and TV broadcasting at Gołogóra near Koszalin in West Pomeranian Voivodeship.

It entered service in 1965 and uses two antenna towers of different height. Both are guyed lattice steel masts with triangular cross-section. The smaller mast is 115 metres tall. The bigger mast, which was built in 1962, had originally a height of 226 metres. It was increased to 270 metres by mounting some further segments and a UHF-broadcasting antenna on its pinnacle.

== Transmitted programmes ==
Radio
Program	Frequency	Power	Polarisation
RMF FM	89,3 MHz	60 kW	vertical
Polskie Radio Program II	93,8 MHz	60 kW	horizontal
Polskie Radio Program III	97,4 MHz	60 kW	horizontal
Polskie Radio Koszalin	103,1 MHz	60 kW	horizontal
Radio Zet	105,3 MHz	30 kW	horizontal
Polskie Radio Program I	107,9 MHz	60 kW	horizontal

Digital Television MPEG-4
Multiplex Number	Frequency	Channel	Power	Polarisation
MUX 1	658 MHz	44	100 kW	horizontal
MUX 2	682 MHz	47	100 kW	horizontal
MUX 3	490 MHz	23	100 kW	horizontal
