= Jemiołów Transmitter =

Radio and Television Broadcasting Centre Jemiołów
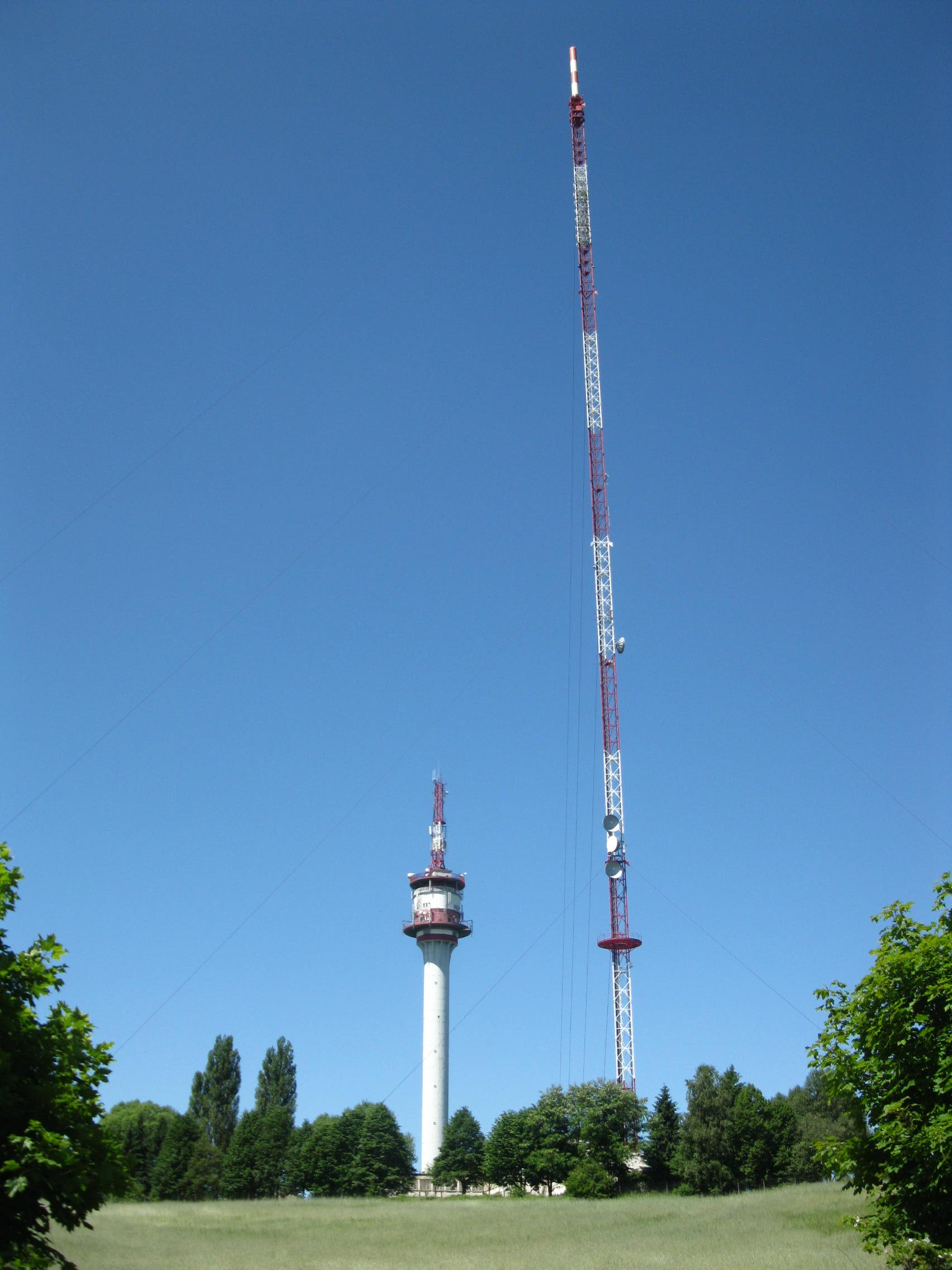
- Interactive map of the Radio and Television Broadcasting Centre Jemiołów area

General information
- Status: Completed
- Type: Mast
- Completed: 1962

Height
- Height: 314 m (1,030.18 ft)

RTCN Jemiołów
- Coordinates: 52°20′51″N 15°16′41″E

Radio and Television Broadcasting Centre Jemiołów (RTCN Jemiołów) is a 314-metre-tall (1,030 ft) guyed mast for FM and TV, and concrete tower about height 99 meters, situated at Jemiołów, Lubusz Voivodeship in Poland. This FM and TV centre which was built in years 1960-1962 from funds assembled socially. There is main broadcast station of Lubusz Voivodeship.

== Transmitted programmes ==
=== FM radio ===
Program	Frequency	ERP	Polarisation	Antenna diagram
Radio ZET	88,30 MHz	60 kW	Horizontal	ND
Polskie Radio Program II	89,90 MHz	60 kW	Horizontal	ND
Polskie Radio Program III	94,10 MHz	60 kW	Horizontal	ND
Radio ZET Chilli	98,40 MHz	0,40 kW	Horizontal	ND
Radio Maryja	100,00 MHz	5 kW	Horizontal	ND
Radio Zachód Zielona Góra	103,00 MHz	120 kW	Horizontal	ND
Polskie Radio Program I	105,00 MHz	60 kW	Horizontal	ND
RMF FM	106,40 MHz	60 kW	Horizontal	ND

== Digital television MPEG-4 ==
Multiplex number	Programme in multiplex	Frequency	Channel	Power ERP	Polarisation	Antenna siagram	Modulation
MUX 1	TVP1; Stopklatka TV; TVP ABC; TV Trwam; Eska TV; TTV; Polo TV; ATM Rozrywka	666 MHz	45	80 kW	Horizontal	ND	64 QAM
MUX 2	Polsat; TVN; TV4; TV Puls; TVN 7; Puls 2; TV6; Super Polsat	474 MHz	21	80 kW	Horizontal	ND	64 QAM
MUX 3	TVP1 HD; TVP2 HD; TVP3 Gorzów Wielkopolski; TVP Sport HD; TVP Info HD; TVP Historia	562 MHz	32	100 kW	Horizontal	ND	64 QAM
MUX 4	TVP 4K; TVP Polonia; TVP Kultura	610 MHz	38	50 kW	Horizontal	ND	64 QAM

== See also ==
- List of masts
