= FM- and TV-mast Zygry =

Zygry Transmitter
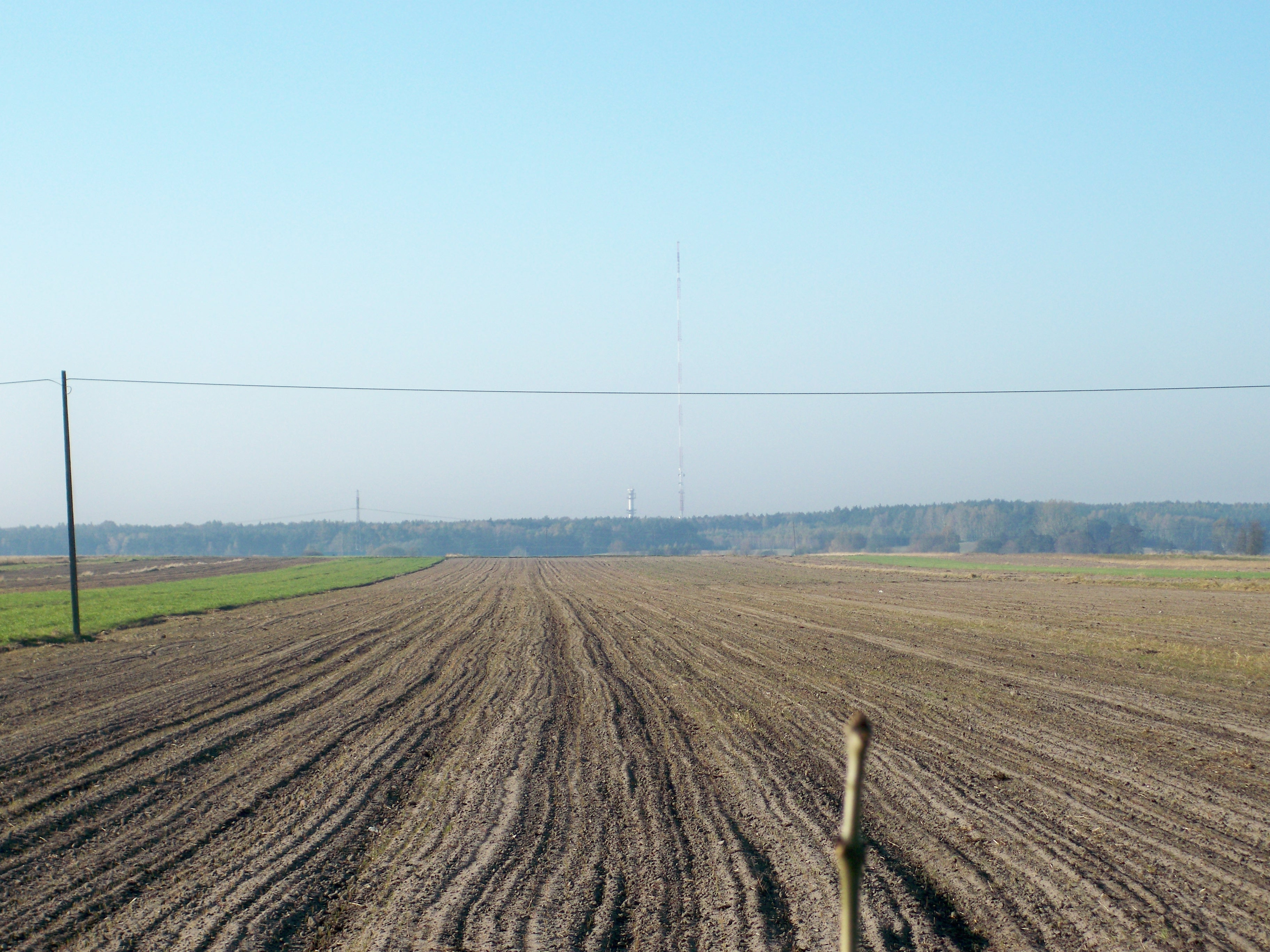
- Interactive map of the Zygry Transmitter area

General information
- Status: Completed
- Type: Mast
- Location: Zygry, Łódź Voivodeship
- Completed: 1975

Height
- Height: 346 m (1,135.17 ft)

Zygry Transmitter
- Coordinates: 51°46′45″N 18°57′12″E

The FM- and TV-mast Zygry is a 346-metre-tall (1,135 ft) guyed mast for FM and TV situated at Zygry in Poland. The FM- and TV-mast Zygry is since the collapse of the Warsaw radio mast the third tallest structure in Poland. FM- and TV-mast Zygry was built between 1970 and 1975.

== Transmitted Programmes ==
=== Digital Television MPEG-4 ===
Multiplex Number	Programme in Multiplex	Frequency	Channel	Power ERP	Polarisation	Antenna Diagram	Modulation
MUX 8	Metro TV; Zoom TV; Nowa TV; WP	205,5 MHz	9	25 kW	Horizontal	ND	64 QAM

== See also ==
- List of masts
