= Śrem Transmitter =

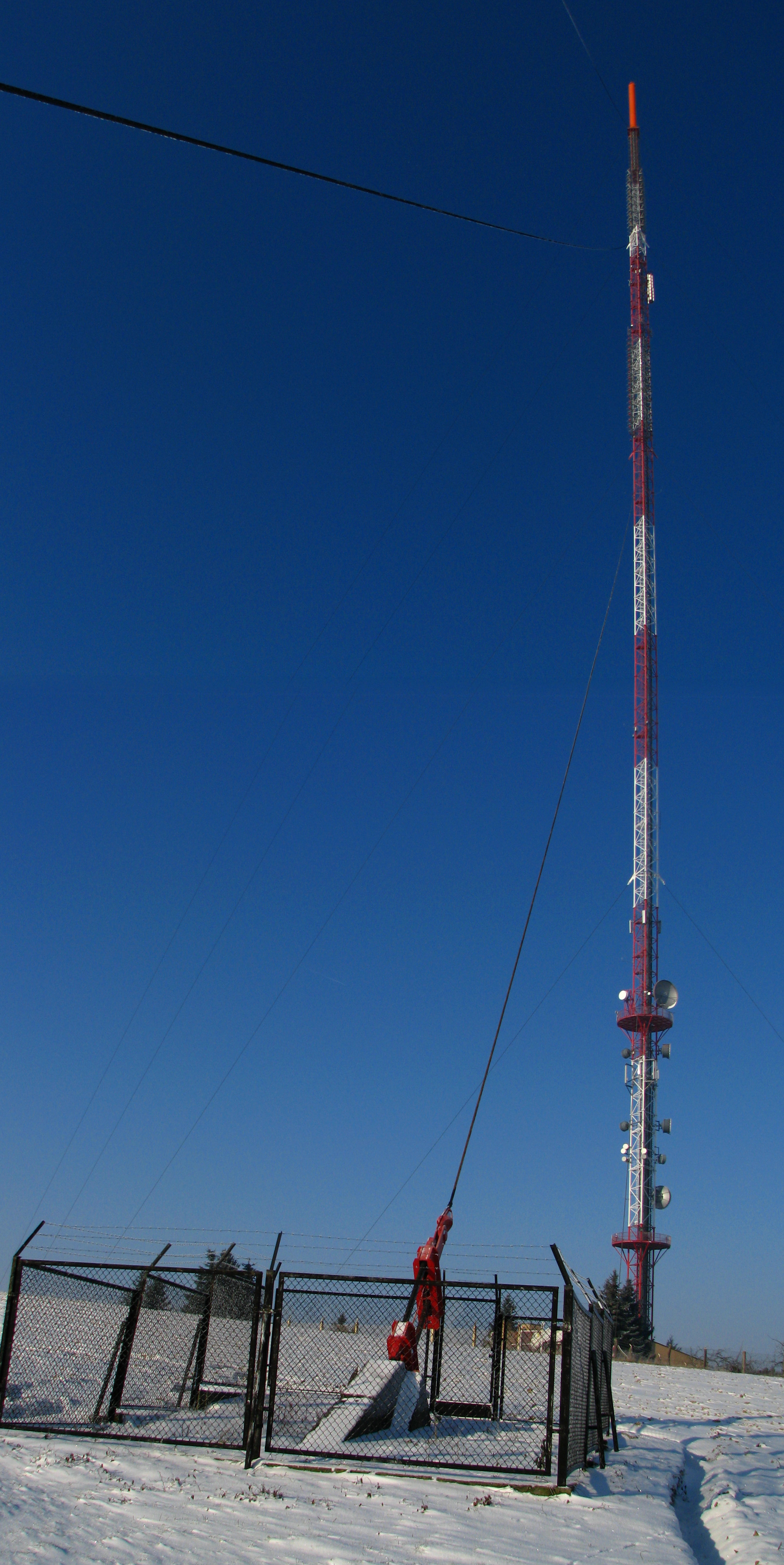
- Interactive map of the Śrem Transmitter area

General information
- Status: Completed
- Type: Mast
- Location: Góra, Śrem County
- Completed: 21 July 1964

Height
- Height: 290 m (951.44 ft)

RTCN Śrem
- Coordinates: 52°07′04″N 16°59′12″E

Śrem Transmitter (RTCN Śrem) Is a 290-metre-tall (950 ft) guyed steel mast, built in 1964 for the broadcasting of signal radio and television signals. It was built as a weighed 220-tonne mast by Mostostal Zabrze. The official opening was on 21 July 1964. The mast is situated in the village "Góra", in Śrem County, Poland. Due to its advantageous location, height and signal strength, its signal covers a considerably large part of the Greater Poland Voivodeship.

== Transmitted Programmes ==
=== FM Radio ===
Program	Frequency	ERP	Polarisation	Antenna diagram
Polskie Radio Program I	92.30 MHz	120 kW	Horizontal	ND
RMF FM	94.60 MHz	120 kW	Horizontal	ND
Polskie Radio Program III	96.40 MHz	120 kW	Horizontal	ND
Radio ZET Gold Poznań	99.40 MHz	2.5 kW	Horizontal	ND
Radio Merkury Poznań	100.90 MHz	120 kW	Horizontal	ND
Emaus – Catholic Radio Poznań	106.20 MHz	1.5 kW	Horizontal	ND
Radio Maryja	106.80 MHz	120 kW	Horizontal	ND

== Digital Television MPEG-4 ==
Multiplex Number	Programme in Multiplex	Frequency	Channel	Power ERP	Polarisation	Antenna Diagram	Modulation
MUX 1	TVP1; Stopklatka TV; TVP ABC; TV Trwam; Eska TV; TTV; Polo TV; ATM Rozrywka	490 MHz	23	100 kW	Horizontal	ND	64 QAM
MUX 2	Polsat; TVN; TV4; TV Puls; TVN 7; Puls 2; TV6; Super Polsat	618 MHz	39	100 kW	Horizontal	ND	64 QAM
MUX 3	TVP1 HD; TVP2 HD; TVP Poznań; TVP Kultura; TVP Historia; TVP Polonia; TVP Rozrywka; TVP Info	522 MHz	27	110 kW	Horizontal	ND	64 QAM

== See also ==
- List of masts
