= Sławoborze Transmitter =

- Interactive map of the Sławoborze Transmitter area

General information
- Status: Completed
- Type: TV Mast
- Location: Sławoborze

Height
- Height: 209 m (685.70 ft)

Sławoborze Mast
- Coordinates: 53°53′10″N 15°41′10″E
- Voivodeship: West Pomeranian Voivodeship
- County: Świdwin County
- Gmina: Sławoborze

Sławoborze Transmitter is a 209-metre-tall (686 ft) guyed mast for FM and TV situated at Sławoborze, West Pomeranian Voivodeship in Poland.

== Transmitted Programmes ==
=== Digital television MPEG-4 ===
Multiplex Number	Programme in Multiplex	Frequency	Channel	Power ERP	Polarisation	Antenna Diagram	Modulation
Multiplex 1	TVP1; Stopklatka TV; TVP ABC; TV Trwam; 8TV; TTV; Polo TV; ATM Rozrywka	666 MHz	45	50 kW	Horizontal	ND	64 QAM
Multiplex 2	Polsat; TVN; TV4; TV Puls; TVN 7; Puls 2; TV6; Super Polsat	706 MHz	50	50 kW	Horizontal	ND	64 QAM
Multiplex 3	TVP1 HD; TVP2 HD; TVP Szczecin; TVP Kultura; TVP Historia; TVP Polonia; TVP Rozrywka; TVP Info	786 MHz	60	50 kW	Horizontal	ND	64 QAM

=== FM Radio ===
Program	Frequency	Power ERP	Polarisation	Antenna Diagram
Polskie Radio Koszalin	92,50 MHz	15 kW	Horizontal	ND
RMF FM	96,40 MHz	15 kW	Horizontal	ND
Polskie Radio Program II	98,20 MHz	15 kW	Horizontal	ND
Polskie Radio Szczecin	98,70 MHz	10 kW	Horizontal	ND
Polskie Radio Program III	101,50 MHz	15 kW	Horizontal	ND
Radio ZET	104,20 MHz	10 kW	Horizontal	ND
Polskie Radio Program I	106,00 MHz	10 kW	Horizontal	ND

== See also ==
- List of masts
