= Mikstat Transmitter =

- Interactive map of the Mikstat Transmitter area

General information
- Status: Completed
- Type: Mast
- Location: Mikstat
- Completed: 1997

Height
- Height: 273 m (895.67 ft)

Mikstat Transmitter
- Coordinates: 51°31′56″N 17°59′39″E

Mikstat Transmitter (RTCN Mikstat) is a 273-metre-tall (896 ft) guyed mast for FM and TV situated at Mikstat, Ostrzeszów County in Poland.

== Transmitted programmes ==
=== Digital television MPEG-4 ===
Multiplex Number	Programme in Multiplex	Frequency	Channel	Power ERP	Polarisation	Antenna Diagram	Modulation	FEC
MUX 1	TVP1; Stopklatka TV; TVP ABC; TV Trwam; Eska TV; TTV; Polo TV; ATM Rozrywka	610 MHz	38	100 kW	Horizontal	ND	64 QAM	3/4
MUX 2	Polsat; TVN; TV4; TV Puls; TVN 7; Puls 2; TV6; Super Polsat	658 MHz	44	100 kW	Horizontal	ND	64 QAM	3/4
MUX 3	TVP1 HD; TVP2 HD; TVP Poznań; TVP Kultura; TVP Historia; TVP Polonia; TVP Rozrywka; TVP Info	554 MHz	31	100 kW	Horizontal	ND	64 QAM	3/4

=== FM radio ===
Program	Frequency	Power ERP	Polarisation	Antenna Diagram
Radio Merkury	91,10 MHz	10 kW	Horizontal	ND
Polskie Radio Program IV	94,20 MHz	10 kW	Horizontal	ND
Polskie Radio Program II	95,60 MHz	10 kW	Horizontal	ND
Polskie Radio Program I	97,90 MHz	10 kW	Horizontal	ND
RMF FM	98,00 MHz	10 kW	Horizontal	ND
Polskie Radio Program I	100,00 MHz	10 kW	Horizontal	ND
Polskie Radio Program III	102,50 MHz	10 kW	Horizontal	ND
Radio ZET	104,40 MHz	10 kW	Horizontal	ND
Radio Centrum	106,40 MHz	10 kW	Horizontal	ND

== See also ==
- List of masts
