= Transmitter Rusinowo =

- Interactive map of the Transmitter Rusinowo area

General information
- Status: Completed
- Type: Mast
- Location: Rusinowo, Wałcz County

Height
- Height: 320 m (1,049.87 ft)

Rusinowo Transmitter
- Coordinates: 53°10′15″N 16°15′49″E

Broadcasting Transmitting Centre in Rusinowo, is a 320 metres tall guyed steel mast, the highest structure of the West Pomeranian Voivodeship, Poland. In years 60 of the ones and 70 of the ones stood right next to the current mast second, earlier put, mast about 270 metres high, as a result of incorrect making of sure join the structure the mast was dismantled because was in danger of collapsing. On the RTCN area Rusinowo are visible in grass old already unused concrete blocks from rust with anchors.

== Transmitted programmes ==
=== FM radio ===
Program	Frequency	ERP	Polarisation	Antenna diagram
Polskie Radio Program Koszalin	88,10 MHz	3 kW	Horizontal	ND
Polskie Radio Program III	90,90 MHz	30 kW	Horizontal	ND
RMF FM	96,60 MHz	30 kW	Horizontal	ND
Radio ZET	97,90 MHz	60 kW	Horizontal	ND
Polskie Radio Program I	101,90 MHz	30 kW	Horizontal	ND
Polskie Radio "Merkury" Poznań	103,60 MHz	60 kW	Horizontal	ND

== Digital television MPEG-4 ==
Multiplex Number	Programme in Multiplex	Frequency	Channel	Power ERP	Polarisation	Antenna Diagram	Modulation
MUX 1	TVP1; Stopklatka TV; TVP ABC; TV Trwam; 8TV; TTV; Polo TV; ATM Rozrywka	642 MHz	42	100 kW	Horizontal	ND	64 QAM
MUX 2	Polsat; TVN; TV4; TV Puls; TVN 7; Puls 2; TV6; Super Polsat	650 MHz	43	100 kW	Horizontal	ND	64 QAM
MUX 3	TVP1 HD; TVP2 HD; TVP Poznań; TVP Kultura; TVP Historia; TVP Polonia; TVP Rozrywka; TVP Info	554 MHz	31	100 kW	Horizontal	ND	64 QAM

== See also ==
- List of masts
