= FM and TV Mast Chwaszczyno =

FM and TV Mast Gdańsk/Chwaszczyno
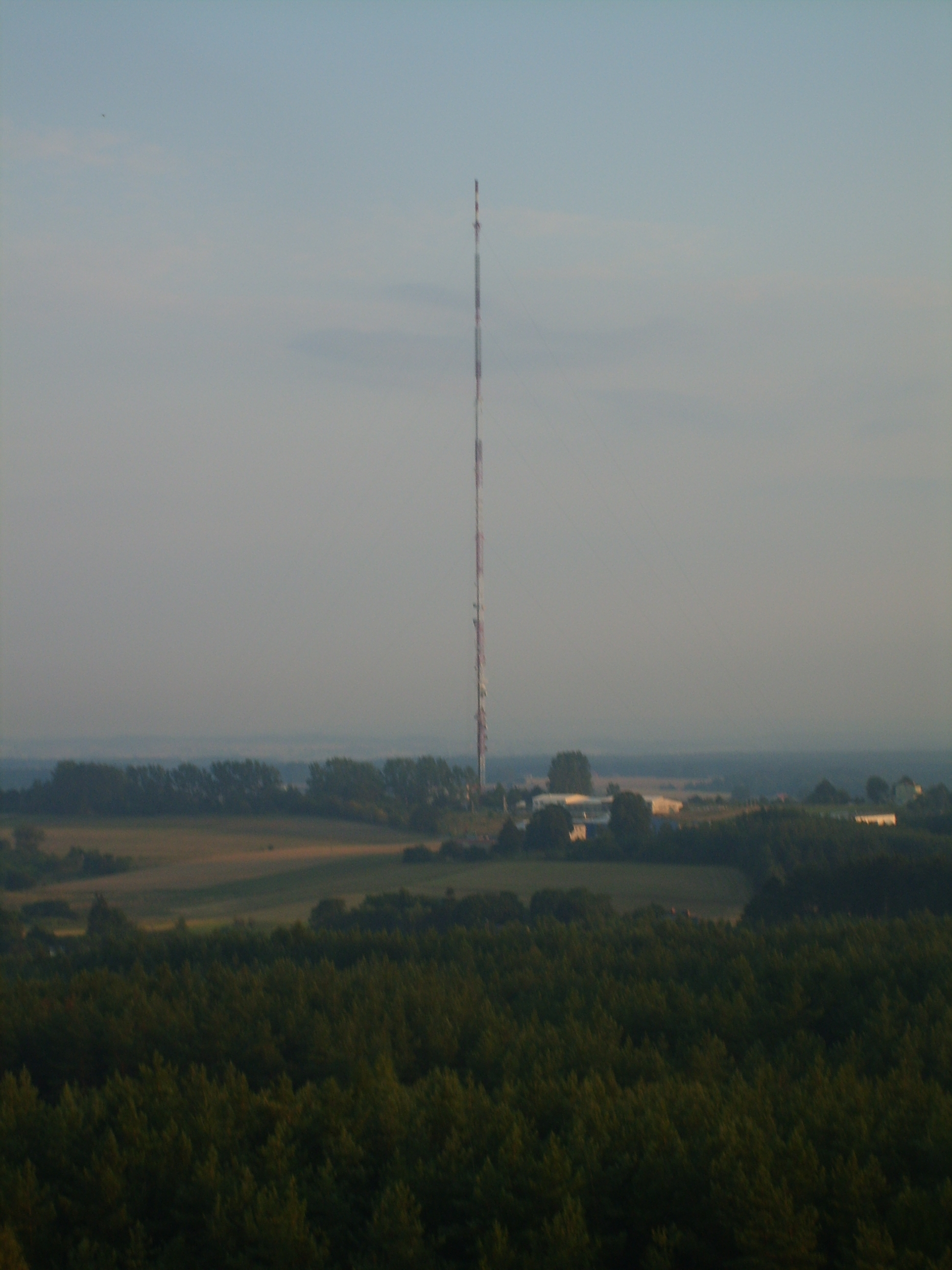
- Interactive map of the FM and TV Mast Gdańsk/Chwaszczyno area

General information
- Status: Completed
- Type: TV Mast
- Location: Chwaszczyno, Poland
- Completed: 1980

Height
- Height: 317 m (1,040.03 ft)

FM and TV Mast Chwaszczyno
- Coordinates: 54°27′10″N 18°26′09″E

The FM and TV Mast Gdańsk/Chwaszczyno (RTCN Gdańsk/Chwaszczyno) is a 317-metre-tall (1,040 ft) guyed mast for FM and TV situated at Chwaszczyno, Kartuzy County, Pomeranian Voivodeship, Poland.

== Transmitted Programmes ==
This mast is used for transmitting the following FM and TV programmes.

== FM Radio ==
Program	Frequency	ERP power	Polarisation	Antenna diagram
Radio Kaszebe	92.30 MHz	2 kW	Horizontal	D
Polskie Radio Program I	95.70 MHz	120 kW	Horizontal	D
RMF FM	98.40 MHz	120 kW	Horizontal	D
Polskie Radio Program III	99.90 MHz	120 kW	Horizontal	D
Radio Plus Gdańsk	101.70 MHz	120 kW	Horizontal	D
Polskie Radio Gdańsk	103.70 MHz	120 kW	Horizontal	D
Radio ZET	105.00 MHz	120 kW	Horizontal	D

=== Digital Television MPEG-4 ===
Multiplex Number	Programme in Multiplex	Frequency	Channel	Power ERP	Polarisation	Antenna Diagram	Modulation
MUX 1	TVP1; Stopklatka TV; TVP ABC; TV Trwam; Eska TV; TTV; Polo TV; ATM Rozrywka	602 MHz	37	100 kW	Horizontal	ND	64 QAM
MUX 2	Polsat; TVN; TV4; TV Puls; TVN 7; Puls 2; TV6; Polsat Sport News	586 MHz	35	100 kW	Horizontal	ND	64 QAM
MUX 3	TVP1 HD; TVP2 HD; TVP Gdańsk; TVP Kultura; TVP Historia; TVP Polonia; TVP Rozrywka; TVP Info	690 MHz	48	100 kW	Horizontal	ND	64 QAM

== See also ==
- List of masts
