= Boży Dar, Lublin County =

Boży Dar
- Village
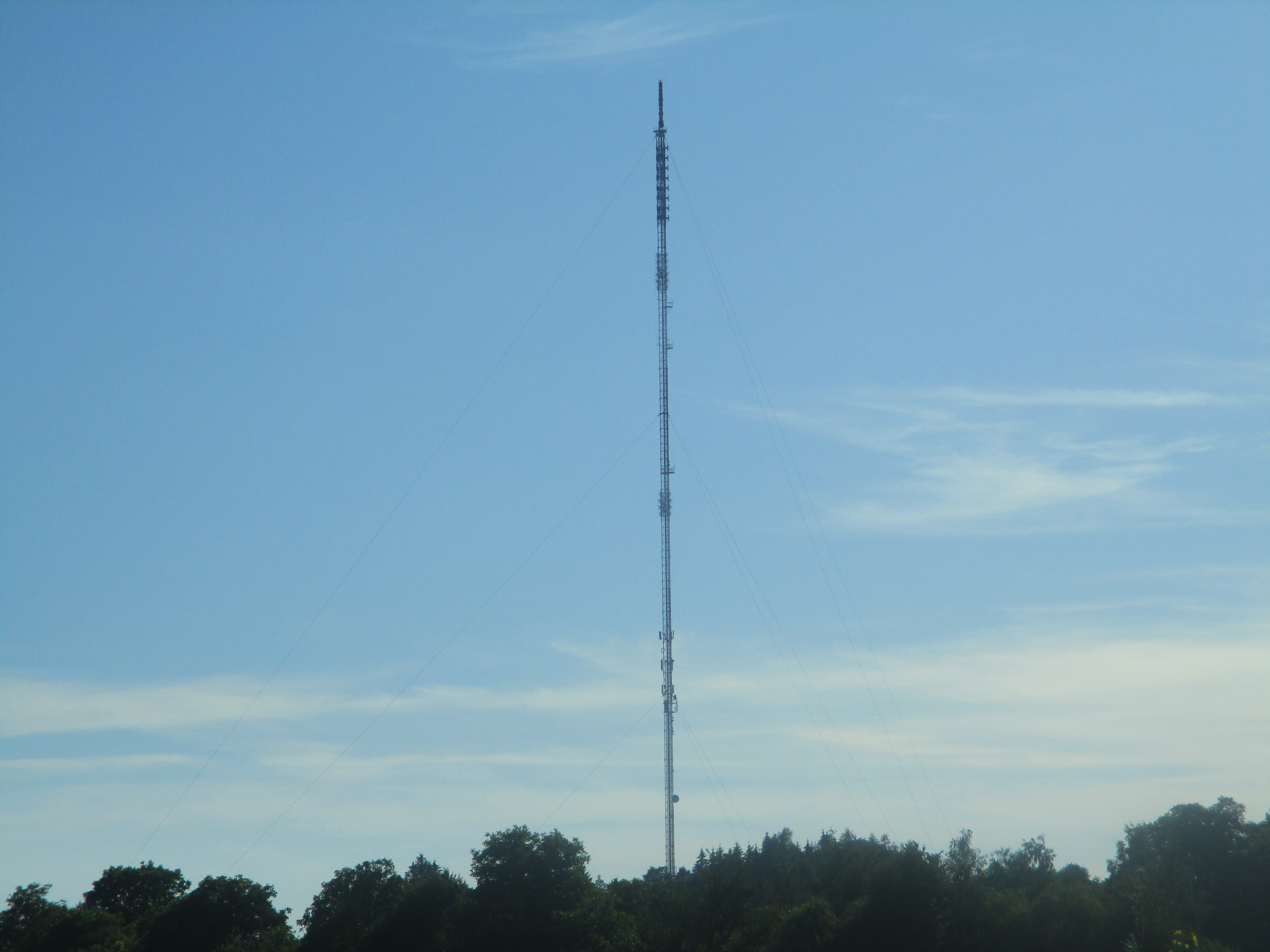

- Location within Poland
- Coordinates: 50°42′10.42″N 23°24′32.42″E
- Country: Poland
- Voivodeship: Lublin
- County: Lublin
- Gmina: Krzczonów

Boży Dar [ˈbɔʐɨ ˈdar] is a village in the administrative district of Gmina Krzczonów, within Lublin County, Lublin Voivodeship, in eastern Poland.
