= Rusinowo, Gmina Tuczno =

Rusinowo
- Village
- Location within Poland
- Coordinates: 53°09′41″N 16°15′14″E
- Country: Poland
- Voivodeship: West Pomeranian
- County: Wałcz
- Gmina: Tuczno
- Population: 240

Rusinowo [ruɕiˈnɔvɔ] (German: Ruschendorf) is a village in the administrative district of Gmina Tuczno, within Wałcz County, West Pomeranian Voivodeship, in north-western Poland.

Before 1772 the area was part of Kingdom of Poland, 1772-1945 Prussia and Germany. For more on its history, see Wałcz County.

The village has a population of 240.
