= ER Piotrków =

ER Piotrków Radio Tower
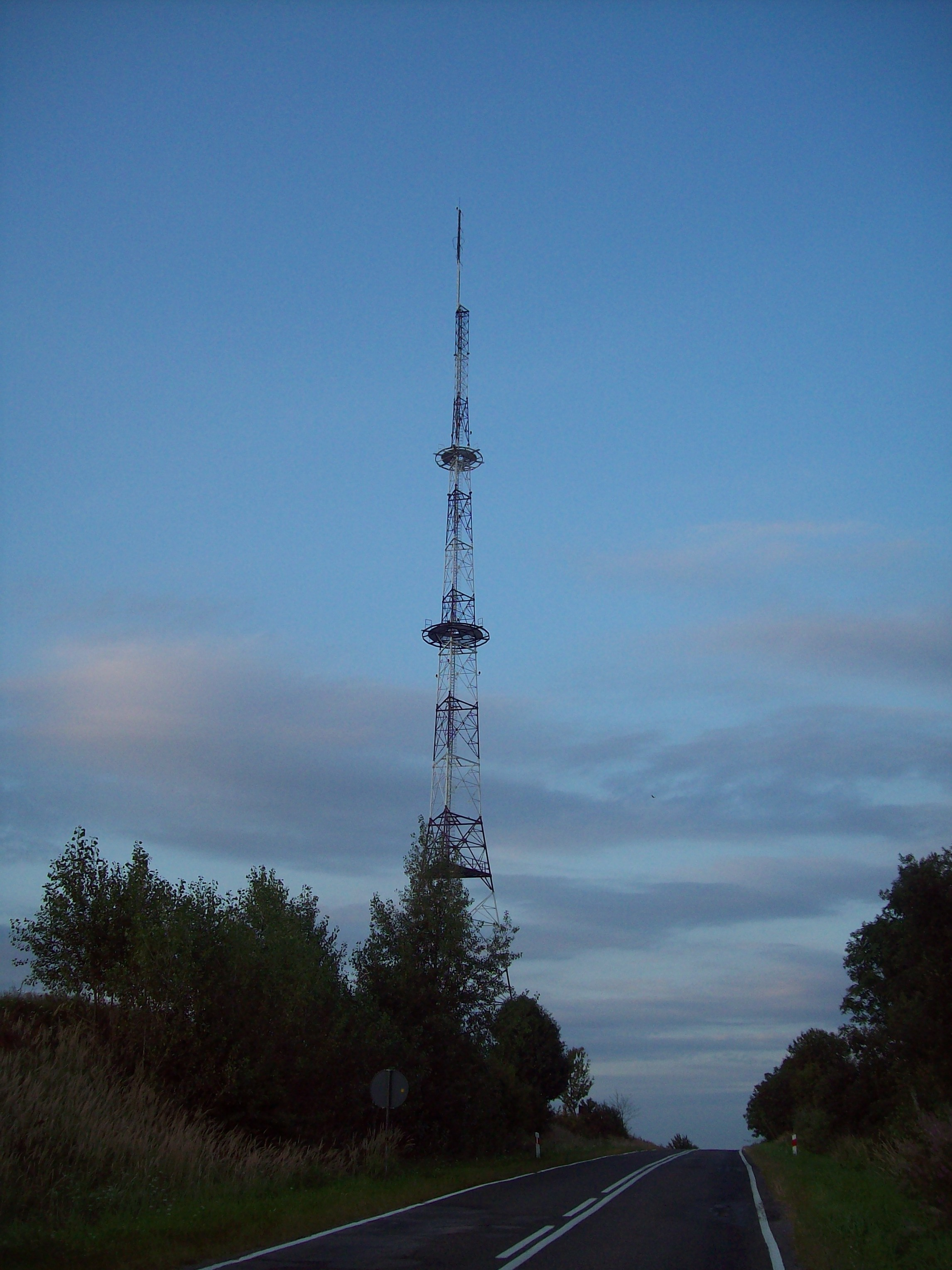
- Interactive map of the ER Piotrków Radio Tower area

General information
- Status: Completed
- Type: Steel mast on a concrete base
- Location: Piotrków Pierwszy
- Completed: 31 December 2003

Height
- Height: 105 m (344.49 ft)

ER Piotrków Radio Tower
- Coordinates: 51°03′22″N 22°38′59″E
- Country: Poland
- Voivodeship: Lublin
- County: Lublin County
- Gmina: Gmina Jabłonna

ER Piotrków is a radio tower in Piotrków Pierwszy, Poland with a height of 105m (344ft.).

The base of the antenna sits at an altitude of 282m (925.2ft.) above sea level. The tower stands at 105m (344ft.), while the antenna systems are suspended at 110m (360.9ft.) above ground level. The tower broadcasts radio station Radio eR Lublin.

Radio
Program	Frequency	Transmitter power	Directivity
Radio Plus Lublin	87.9MHz	25kW	Omnidirectional

== History ==
The construction of the tower of the Archdiocese of Lublin began in the fall of 2003. According to press announcements, the over a hundred-meter-long structure was a votive offering for the 25th anniversary of the pontificate of Pope John Paul II. The radio facility of the tower was also supposed to reduce the costs of broadcasting the archdiocesan program, which was previously broadcast from Bożego Daru (in Polish). Broadcasting from the new location began on December 30, 2003. A week later, Archbishop Józef Życiński consecrated the facility.
