= Transmitter Heilsberg =

Coordinates: 54°08′25″N 20°33′52″E

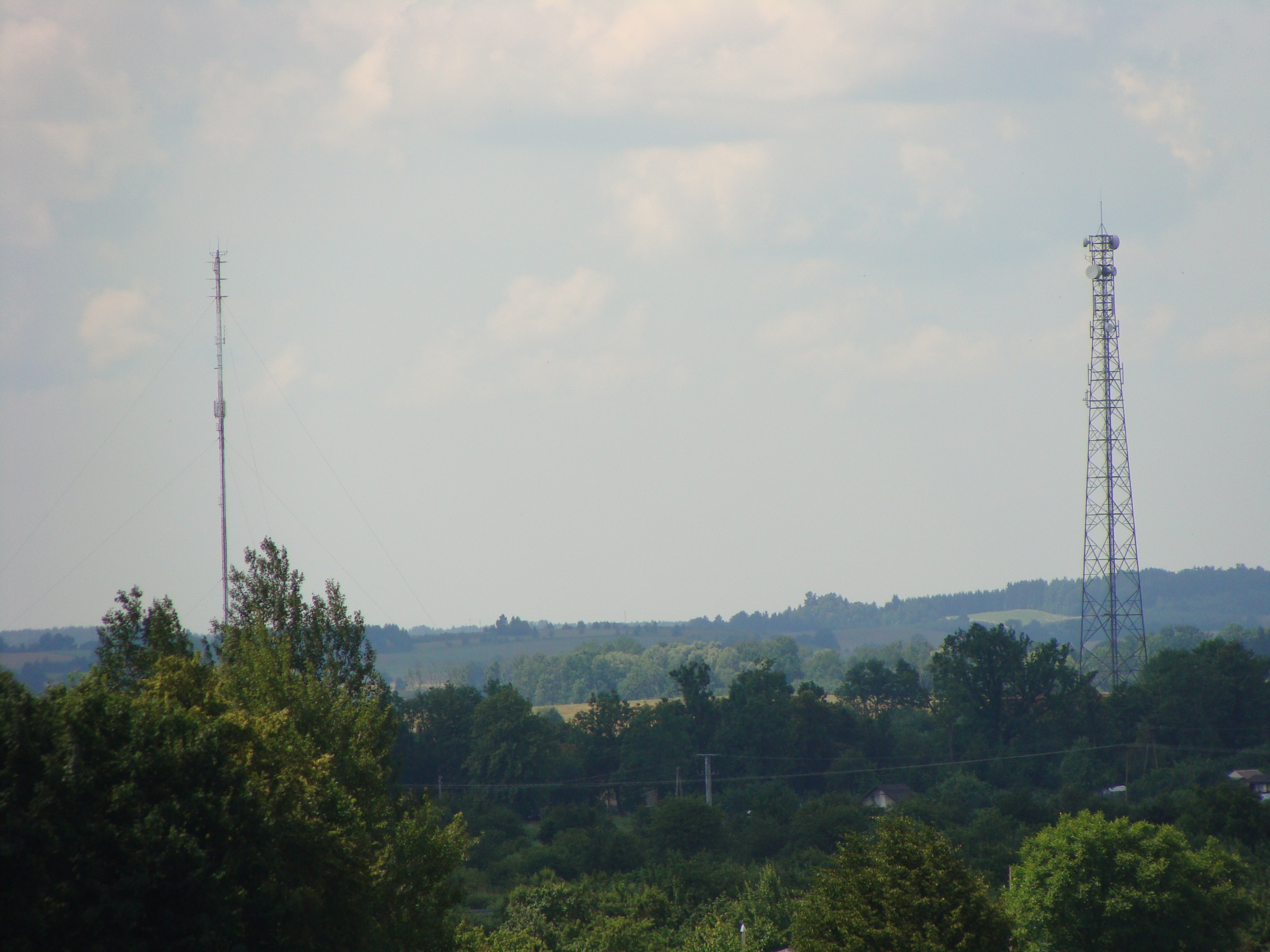
RON Lidzbark Warmiński, 2008 condition

The Heilsberg transmitter (German: Sender Heilsberg) was a large radio transmitting station operated by the Reichs-Rundfunk-Gesellschaft between 1930 and 1945 in the German Province of East Prussia. It was sited approximately 3 kilometres (1.9 mi) northwest of Heilsberg (known after 1946 as Lidzbark Warmiński), on the road to Preußisch Eylau (Bagrationovsk).

== History ==
It went live on 15 December 1930 with a transmitting power of 60 kilowatts, using a vertical cage antenna, which was hung with a rope spun between two 102 metres (335 ft) tall free-standing wood towers 200 metres (660 ft) apart. In 1935, the transmitting power was increased to 100 kilowatts and the vertical cage aerial was replaced by a dipole with top capacity and coil, which was carried by a 115 metres (377 ft) high free-standing wood tower. In 1940, this was replaced with a 151 metres (495 ft) high guyed mast of square cross section lattice steel, which was insulated against ground. In addition, a triangle plane antenna and a 50 metres (160 ft) high guyed mast (also insulated against ground) were installed.

On 31 January 1945, the facility was largely destroyed by the withdrawing Wehrmacht armed forces. After World War II a transmitter was operated on the site by the Soviet Foreign Service. From the mid 1950s until the mid 1990s a local program was broadcast there with low power. A shortwave facility for cross-border skywave jamming beamed towards the Soviet Union, Czechoslovakia and Bulgaria has existed in Lidzbark Warmiński. The jamming facility was shut off for good in late 1988.

The present-day Broadcast Transmitting Site (Polish: Radiofoniczny Ośrodek Nadawczy, RON) at Lidzbark Warmiński which has a 83 metres (272 ft) tall antenna is today used for broadcasting of Radio Maryja on 106,2 MHz with 10 kW ERP and the TV programme TVP 1 on 527,25 MHz with 200 kW ERP.
