= Transmitter Nowa Karczma =

Transmitter Nowa Karczma is a facility for FM and TV transmission at Nowa Karczma, Poland at 51°09′01″N 15°10′34″E. It uses as antenna tower a 134-metre-high (440 ft) guyed mast.

== Transmitted Programmes ==
Radio
Program	Frequency	Transmitted Power	Polarisation
Polskie Radio Program I	99.0 MHz	10 kW	H
Polskie Radio Program III	91.5 MHz	60 kW	H
Polskie Radio Wrocław	103.6 MHz	60 kW	H
RMF FM	93.8 MHz	60 kW	H
Radio ZET	89.4 MHz	60 kW	H

Digital TV
Multiplex 3	Frequency	Channel	Transmitted Power	Polarisation
TVP1; TVP2 HD; TVP Wrocław; TVP Kultura; TVP Historia; TVP Polonia; TVP Rozrywka	698 MHz	49	20 kW	H

== See also ==
List of masts
