= Radom longwave transmitter =

Coordinates: 51°24′30.97″N 21°7′6.51″E

Radom longwave transmitter is a facility for commercial longwave transmission ( not broadcasting) west of Radom in Poland. Radom longwave transmitter, situated at 51°25'N and 21°07' E is the only transmission facility for frequencies under 100 kHz in Poland. It uses an antenna system carried by one 150-metre-tall (490 ft) and three 100-metre-tall (330 ft) guyed masts. Radom longwave transmitter worked (and perhaps still works) on the following frequencies with the following callsigns:

- 55.75 kHz, callsign: SOA60, 40 kW transmission power
- 58.25 kHz, callsign: SOA70, 360 kW transmission power
- 62.45 kHz, callsign: SOA80, 40 kW transmission power
- 64.9 kHz, callsign: SOA90, 40 kW transmission power
- 76.35 kHz, callsign: SNA20, 40 kW transmission power
- 80.5 kHz, callsign: SNA30, 40 kW transmission power
- 81.35 kHz, callsign: SNA40, 40 kW transmission power

== Today's use ==
Today one of the masts is used for FM and TV broadcasting, under the name RON Radom.

DVB-TMPEG-4 Television
Multiplex	Frequency	Channel	Transmission power
MUX 3	642 MHz	42	50 kW

Radio
Program	Frequency	Transmission power
Radio dla Ciebie, Polskie Radio - Regionalna Rozgłośnia w Warszawie "Radio dla Ciebie" S.A.	89.10 MHz	5 kW
Radio Maryja, Prowincja Warszawska Zgromadzenia O.O. Redemptorystów	94.20 MHz	0.50 kW
PR2, Polskie Radio S.A.	100.30 MHz	1 kW
Radio ESKA Radom, Radio Radom Sp. z o.o.	106.90 MHz	10 kW

== Sources ==
- Gerd Klawitter, Lang- und Längstwelllenfunk, Siebel-Verlag, ISBN 3-922221-48-3
- Table of air traffic obstacles, Agencja Ruchu Lotniczego
- Aerial View
- Picture
