= Transmitter Żagań-Wichów =

Transmitter Wichów
- Coordinates: 51°44′54″N 15°28′41″E

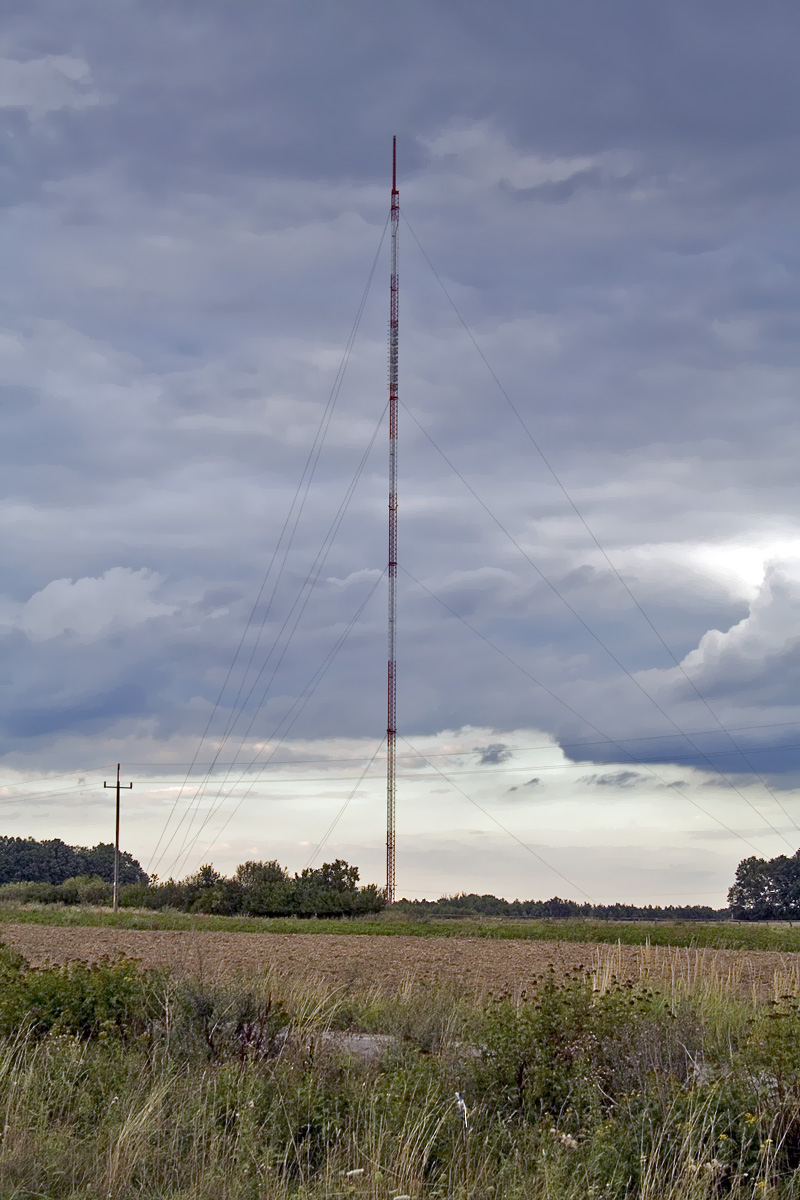
Transmitter Wichów

Transmitter Żagań/Wichów is a facility for FM and TV situated at Żagań/Wichów in Poland. It uses as antenna tower a 280-metre-tall (920 ft) guyed mast built in 2003.

== Transmitted Programmes ==
=== Digital TV-Programmes ===
Program	Frequency	Channel Number	Transmission Power	Polarisation	Antenna diagram
MUX 1	666 MHz	45	50 kW	Horizontal	ND
MUX 2	634 MHz	41	50 kW	Horizontal	ND
MUX 3	562 MHz	32	50 kW	Horizontal	ND

=== FM-Radio Programmes ===
Program	Frequency	Transmission Power
PR3 Polskie Radio S.A.	87,80 MHz	30 kW
PR1 Polskie Radio S.A.	91,20 MHz	30 kW
RMF FM Radio Muzyka Fakty Sp. z o.o.	94,80 MHz	30 kW
Radio ZET Radio ZET Sp. z o.o.	97,50 MHz	30 kW
Radio Maryja Prowincja Warszawska Zgromadzenia O.O. Redemptorystów	101,20 MHz	10 kW
PR4 Polskie Radio S.A.	104,70 MHz	30 kW
Radio Zachód Polskie Radio - Regionalna Rozgłośnia w Zielonej Górze "Radio Zachód" S.A.	106 MHz	30 kW

== See also ==
- List of masts
