= Boży Dar transmitter =

Broadcasting facility in Poland

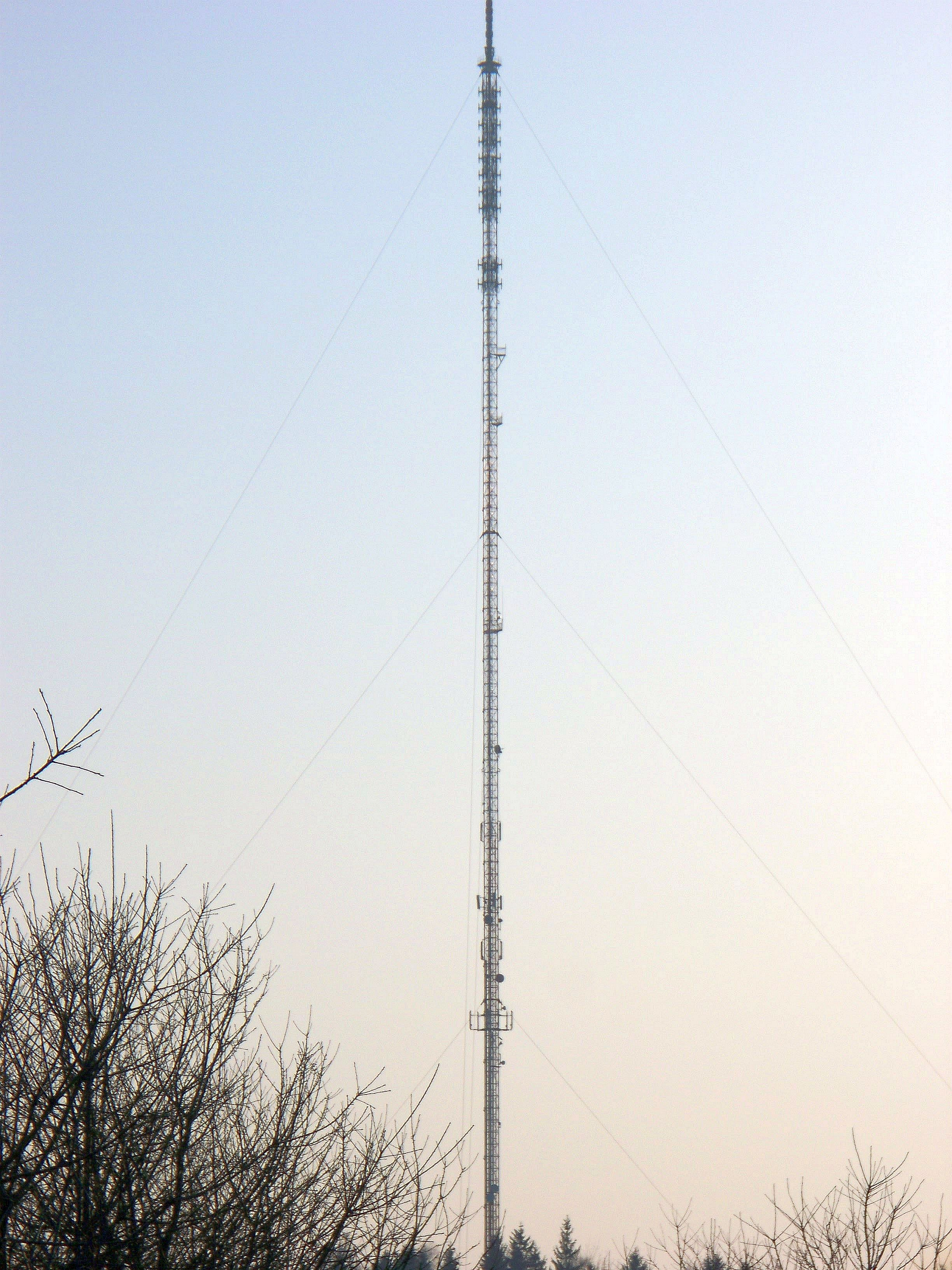
Bozy Dar Mast

Boży Dar transmitter is a broadcasting facility near Bozy Dar close to Lublin, Poland. Built in 1962, it transmits from a 210 metres all guyed mast located at 51°0′17″N 22°39′12″E

It broadcasts the FM radio program Radio Zet on 107 MHz with 120 kW ERP. The FM-broadcasting antennas is 182 metres, while the TV broadcasting antenna is located at 206 metres above ground. Boży Dar transmitter has a second mast with a height of 105 metres. It is a mast radiator insulated against ground situated at 51°0′9″N 22°39′20″E.

It was erected in 1961 and used for broadcasting the second program of Polskie Radio on 1206 kHz (before 23 November 1978 on 1367 kHz) with 60 kW ERP until 1 February 1998. The current use of the mast is unknown.
