= Koszęcin radio transmitter =

Coordinates: 50°39′14″N 18°51′25″E

Transmitter Koszęcin is a facility for mediumwave and FM broadcasting near Koszecin, Poland (Geographical Coordinates: 50°39'14"N 18°51'25"E ). It was opened in 1977. It has two guyed masts: the first one is 110 metres high, is grounded, and carries antennas for FM broadcasting (Radio Maryja on 107.0 MHz ERP, 5.00 kW, polarization V); the second is 138m high. That second mast is insulated from ground and used for mediumwave transmission; broadcasting of the Radio Pahonia in Belarusian is planned on 1080 kHz with ERP 350 kW using this mast. The signal will cover the whole of Europe including the Ural Mountains. Earlier, the AM Mast was used for Polish Radio and used two Tesla transmitters 750 kW each in parallel. With the transmitted power of 1500 kW it was one of the most powerful mediumwave transmitters in the world.

== See also ==
- List of masts
