= Wola Rasztowska =

- Village
- Location within Poland
- Coordinates: 52°27′N 21°18′E
- Country: Poland
- Voivodeship: Masovian
- County: Wołomin
- Gmina: Klembów

Wola Rasztowska ([ˈvɔla raʂˈtɔfska]) is a village in the administrative district of Gmina Klembów, within Wołomin County, Masovian Voivodeship, in east-central Poland.
