= ATM Rozrywka =

Polish television channel

- Country: Poland
- Broadcast area: Poland

Programming
- Picture format: 16:9 576i (SDTV)

Ownership
- Owner: Telewizja Polsat

History
- Launched: 1 August 2012
- Closed: 24 February 2021

Links
- Website: atmrozrywka.tv

Availability

Terrestrial
- Polish Digital: MUX 1 (Channel 15)

ATM Rozrywka was a Polish television channel owned by ATM Grupa. It was launched on 1 August 2012. This channel was created for the first multiplex of digital terrestrial television in Poland and satelitte Eutelsat Hot Bird 13B. It was owned 100% by Telewizja Polsat.

It was closed on 24 February 2021 because the concession of broadcasting wasn’t extended.

== Schedule ==
In network schedule ATM Rozrywka aired comedy sitcoms series, quiz shows and reality shows.

== See also ==
- Television in Poland
