= TVP3 =

Polish public regional television channel operated since 1994

- Logo used since from January 2016
- Country: Poland

Programming
- Picture format: 16:9/4:3 576i/1080i

Ownership
- Owner: Telewizja Polska

History
- Launched: 5 September 1994; 32 years ago (original); 1 September 2013; 13 years ago (relaunch)
- Closed: 5 October 2007; 19 years ago (original)
- Replaced by: TVP Info (Regional branches)
- Former names: TVP Regionalna (1994–2000, 2013–2016); TVP3 Regionalna/TVP3 (2000–2007)

Links
- Website: www.regiony.tvp.pl

Availability

Terrestrial
- Polish digital: MUX 3 (Channel 3)

TVP3 (formerly TVP Regionalna, known also as Regionalna Trójka or Program 3 Telewizji Polskiej) is a Polish TV channel, run by the public broadcaster, TVP and dedicated to the country's regions. It has regional branches in most of the major Polish cities and, similarly to the France 3 in France or Rai Tre in Italy, for a couple of hours every day it broadcast regional programming, including local news and reports. On 20 December 2023, TVP3's signal was shut down and instead, TVP2 started being broadcast. On the same day, the website was shut down and started redirecting to the main TVP website, but on 26 December 2023, the channel returned to the air.

== History ==
=== 1994–2002 (as TVP Regionalna) ===
In the early 1990s, the regional branches of Telewizja Polska (TVP) began launching full-day regional programming, while still airing selected segments (mainly local news) as local slots within the TVP2 schedule.

In 1994, the first management board of TVP S.A. realized that the regional branches were not yet capable of filling several hours of daily programming. Consequently, the eleven existing regional centers at the time decided to create a shared programming block. To coordinate their work, the Office of Regional Branches (Biuro Oddziałów Terenowych) was established on 1 April 1994, initially headed by Janusz Daszczyński.

On 5 September 1994, ten TVP centers launched a daily, nearly four-hour block of shared program and advertising content. It began at 3:10 p.m. with the animated fairy tale “Abdallah ziemski i Abdallah morski” ("Abdallah of the Earth and Abdallah of the Sea"). The block was divided into three parts:

- 3:10–4:30 p.m. – children’s and youth programs,
- 5:35–6:05 p.m. – TV series,
- 7:15–9:15 p.m. – feature and documentary films.

This system of shared programming was named "The Network" (Sieć).

In July 1996, TVP’s management established the twelfth regional branch – OTV Białystok. However, the Białystok center did not yet launch its own programming that year.

By 2001, the shared programming block accounted for over 75% of regional broadcasting time. The block was compiled by the Office of Regional Programs (Biuro Programów Regionalnych – BRP) in Warsaw. The remaining airtime consisted of local programming, independently produced by TVP’s regional branches.

==== Programming statistics for 2001 ====
In 2001, the twelve regional branches of TVP held a 3.5% share of the Polish TV market. Local programming was broadcast on weekdays in the following time slots:

- Morning: 8:00–8:35 a.m.
- Afternoon: 3:25–4:30 p.m. and 5:15–7:00 p.m.
- Evening: 9:30–10:00 p.m.

On weekends, the hours differed slightly:

- Morning: 8:00–9:00 a.m.
- Midday: 1:30–2:30 p.m.
- Afternoon: 5:00–7:00 p.m. (or 6:00–6:20 p.m.)
- Evening: 9:00–10:00 p.m.

The regional programming schedule had a universal character. The main portion of airtime consisted of feature films, series, and animated films, which together made up 53.3% of annual broadcast time. Most films were American productions (11%), followed by Polish (5%) and British (3.3%).

Other program categories by share of annual airtime in 2001 were as follows:

- Documentaries: 14.6% (more than half were reportages)
- Educational programs: 8.8% (most aired in the shared block – 6.5%)
- Public affairs: 8.8%
- Entertainment: 5.9% (mostly in the shared block)
- News: 5.6%
- Music: 4.9% (mostly in the shared block – 3.6%)
- Sports: 4.8% (mostly in the shared block – 3.7%)
- Religious programs: 1.3% (four times more in local than shared blocks)
- Theatrical and dramatized productions: 0.5% (mostly in the shared block)

=== 2002–2007 (as TVP3) ===
By the autumn of 2000, regional broadcasting segments were already using a shared name and logo – TVP3. The shared programming block also adopted this branding.

On 3 March 2002, TVP3 officially launched, replacing the previous regional programs across Poland. All TVP regional stations were reorganized as regional branches of TVP3, airing their local programs in designated time slots on the shared nationwide feed. As a result, TVP3 was treated as one channel with local windows.

The channel offered a variety of content, primarily news and current affairs, but also feature films, documentaries, TV series, magazines, and sports coverage. Its flagship news program was Kurier.

From late August 2002, parliamentary sessions of the Sejm were broadcast exclusively on TVP3’s national feed, whereas they had previously also aired on TVP2.

In March 2003, the channel received a new visual identity and logo. On 7 September 2003, Kurier and TVP3’s public affairs shows adopted new studio designs, featuring white and green colors inspired by the new logo. Around the same time, Telewizja Polska began trial video streaming of TVP3 via mobile networks.

By January 2004, the Warsaw version of TVP3 was already available on the Canal+ satellite platform.

==== Programming statistics for 2006 ====
In 2006, TVP3 held a 4.8% share of the Polish television market. Among the programs that made up both the national shared schedule and the regional programming slots, news and current affairs broadcasts had the largest share — accounting for nearly 54% of the annual airtime in the national block and 48.4% in local programs.

On average, regional TVP3 branches broadcast just over 4 hours of programming per day.

Other program categories by airtime share in 2006 included:

- Documentaries: 12.8% in the national block, 8.5% in regional programming (including 6.8% reportages)
- Feature films: 11.4% in the national block, 0.8% in regional programming (Note: In 2006, feature films were broadcast in the local programming slots only by the regional branches in Wrocław, Katowice, Kraków, and Opole)
- Sports programs and broadcasts: 5.8% in the national block, 12.9% in regional programming
- Religious broadcasts: 1.9% in the national block, 3.4% in regional programming
- Educational programs: 1.6% in the national block, 3.9% in regional programming
- Entertainment programs: 0.2% in the national block, 0.4% in regional programming
- Music programs: 0.2% in the national block, 3.9% in regional programming

==== Programming and visual changes (2007) ====
On 2 January 2007, TVP3 introduced a new schedule featuring a significantly increased number of news bulletins. These not only presented news but also broadcast live press conferences and events.

The bulletins lasted about 15 minutes each and were aired on weekdays from 6:00 to 9:30 a.m. every 15 minutes, and from 10:00 a.m. every 30 minutes. On weekends, they were aired hourly.

The graphic design of the channel was also changed — from then on, it used a red color scheme with some white accents[24], while the station’s logo remained green.

Regionalna Trójka (Regional Channel Three) ended broadcasting on 5 October 2007, and the following day, TVP Info was launched in its place.

=== Notable TVP3 Programs (2002–2007) ===
- Kurier – the main news program of TVP3.
- Echa dnia (Echoes of the day) – a daily live current affairs program broadcast after Kurier, offering commentary on key national and regional political, social, and economic topics, often introduced by short editorials.
- Gość dnia (Guest of the day) – a short morning studio interview.
- Telekurier – a daily publicist and reportage magazine; between 2002 and 2004, it had a companion program Telekurier bis, summarizing the most interesting reports.
- To jest temat (This is the topic) – a daily block of reports prepared by TVP regional journalists.
- Świat (World) – a Saturday magazine presenting a review of the week’s most interesting film materials.
- Teleplotki (Telegossip)– a show covering film and entertainment news about celebrities and curiosities.
- Regiony kultury (Cultural Regions) – a daily cultural information magazine.
- Etniczne klimaty (Ethnic vibes)– a longer program dealing with ethnic and cultural issues.
- Telenowyny – a news program aimed at the Ukrainian minority in Poland.
- Kowalski i Schmidt (Kowalski and Schmidt) – a show about the coexistence of Polish and German communities in Western Poland.
- Kwartet – a magazine featuring the regions of the Visegrád Group countries.
- Integracja (Integration) – a program devoted to people with disabilities.
- Młodzież kontra... czyli pod ostrzałem (Youth Against... Under Fire) – a political debate program featuring youth representatives of political parties.
- Było, nie minęło – Kronika zwiadowców historii (It Was, Has Not Passed – Chronicle of History's Scout) – a historical and exploration-themed television series.

=== 2007–2013 (as TVP Info) ===
On 6 October 2007, the TVP3 channel was replaced by TVP Info, which had an informational and regional profile. The launch of the new channel did not significantly affect the regional centers’ programming, which continued as before — initially without the number "3" in their logos.

On 1 December 2007, these were replaced by logos modeled on the national design.

From 1 September 2013, TVP Info became an independent, 24-hour news channel, while the regional centers reverted to the name TVP Regionalna.

=== 2013–2016 (as TVP Regionalna again) ===
On 23 May 2013, during the international conference “The Role of TVP Regional Branches in the Development of the Information Society” at the University of Warsaw, Telewizja Polska (TVP) announced plans to create a new regional channel that would replace all local TVP stations in Poland. According to the plans presented, the new TVP Regionalna (initially referred to as TVP3 Regiony) would broadcast 18–20 hours of programming daily, gradually increasing its airtime. The schedule was to include 4.5 hours of original programming and 2.5 hours of co-produced content, with a strong emphasis on news and public affairs.

On 1 September 2013, the sixteen regional branches forming TVP Regionalna became part of the newly established Center for Regional Programming (Ośrodek Programów Regionalnych). On the same day, regular broadcasting began at 7:00 a.m., and the channel became available on the third national digital terrestrial multiplex (MUX 3). On 6 September 2013, TVP Regionalna (TVP Warszawa only) joined Polsat Box, and on 9 September, it was also added to Canal+, Telewizja na Kartę, and Orange TV.

On 22 October 2013, a new information portal was launched at regionalna.tvp.pl. That year, TVP Regionalna organized New Year’s Eve concerts in Rzeszów, Katowice, and Wrocław, broadcast nationwide and featuring popular Polish artists such as Doda and Bajm. Between 7 and 23 February 2014, the channel also retransmitted events from the 2014 Winter Olympics in Sochi during late-night national programming blocks. In 2014–2015, it aired live speedway matches from the Nice Polish Speedway League (also on TVP Sport). From autumn 2014, the station began broadcasting weekend film slots and Polish TV series, including the comedy series Święta wojna and the docu-soap Przedszkolandia; in spring 2015, reruns of the telenovela Plebania began from the very first episode.

=== Broadcasting hours ===
Local programming on TVP Regionalna was broadcast 4.5 hours on weekdays and 5.5 hours on weekends.

- From 1 September to 30 November 2013, TVP Regionalna aired 18 hours daily, from 6:30 a.m. to 12:30 a.m. on weekdays, and from 7:00 a.m. to 1:00 a.m. on weekends.
- From 1 December 2013, the channel began 24-hour broadcasting.

During this time:

- From 1 September to 30 November 2013, regional windows were broadcast Monday to Friday at 7:30–8:00, 15:00–16:00, 17:30–19:00, 20:00–21:00, and 22:00–22:30; and on weekends at 10:00–11:00, 15:00–16:00, 17:30–19:00, 20:00–21:00, and 22:00–23:00.
- From 1 December 2013 to 30 August 2015, regional programming aired Monday to Friday at 7:30–8:00, 17:30–21:00, and 22:00–22:30; and on weekends at 10:00–11:00, 17:30–21:00, and 22:00–23:00.
- From 31 August 2015 to 1 January 2016, local programming aired Monday to Friday at 7:30–8:00 and 18:00–22:15, and on weekends at 10:00–11:00 and 18:00–22:15.

==== Notable programs of TVP Regionalna ====
Sources:

- Dziennik Regionów (Regional News Bulletin) – News program from TVP’s regional branches
- Echa dnia (Echoes of the Day) – Public affairs program
- Echa dnia – komentarze (until 2015) – Commentary edition of Echa dnia
- Raport z Polski (Report from Poland, until 2016) – Daily magazine featuring reports from across the country
- Telekurier – Investigative magazine
- Co niesie dzień (What the Day Brings, until 2021) – Morning program presenting the most important national events of the day (Mon–Fri, 8:00)
- Młodzież kontra... czyli pod ostrzałem (Youth vs... Under Fire) – Political discussion program featuring youth wings of political parties
- Kultowe rozmowy (Cult Conversations) – Interview program hosted by Tomasz Raczek and Katarzyna Marcysiak
- Wstęp wolny – z kulturą (Free Admission – With Culture) – Cultural magazine
- Głos regionów (Voice of the Regions) – Weekly live intervention program
- Czas na pracę! Praca na czasie! (Time for Work! Work on Time!)– Employment and career advice program
- AgroSzansa (AgroOpportunity, until 2017) – Agricultural magazine
- Przystanek Ziemia (Station Earth) – Religious program
- Rączka gotuje (Rączka Cooks) – Culinary program from TVP Katowice
- EkoAgent – Environmental and investigative magazine
- Czas na jazdę (Time to Drive) – Motoring program for car enthusiasts
- Polska samorządna (Self-governing Poland) – Local government magazine
- Relacje (Relations) – Economic affairs program
- Seniorada – Family-oriented monthly program
- Klub srebrnego włosa (Silver Hair Club) – Monthly program for seniors
- Akademia.pl – Academic magazine
- Bez barier (Without Barriers) – Monthly program for people with disabilities
- Otwórz oczy (Open Your Eyes) – Monthly program dedicated to the visually impaired
- Telenowyny – Program for the Ukrainian minority in Poland
- Zobacz dokument (Watch the Documentary) – Daily documentary block
- Antenowe remanenty (Antenna Archives) – Archival programming presenting rediscovered regional TV productions
- Zapraszamy na kawę (Join us for coffee) – Live morning lifestyle talk show
- Dzień, miesiąc i rok (Day, month and year) – Short historical calendar program aired after midnight and early mornings
- Wokół nas (Around us) – Live program showcasing various places across Poland

=== Since 2016 (once again as TVP3) ===
==== 2016–2020 ====
On 17 November 2015, during the conference “Regional Public Television, or Public Television of the Regions?” held at the Faculty of Political Science and Journalism of Adam Mickiewicz University in Poznań, which was attended by the Director of the Regional Programming Center of TVP, Bogumił Osiński, and the Director of TVP Poznań, Lena Bretes-Dorożała, information was announced about the return to the name TVP3.

On 17 December 2015, a new website under the address tvp3.tvp.pl was launched, replacing the previous portal regionalna.tvp.pl.

On 2 January 2016, TVP3 returned to Polish screens, replacing TVP Regionalna. The common nationwide programming block was shortened, and each regional branch increased the length of its local programming. On 4 January 2016, new morning and afternoon time slots were introduced. Originally, this was meant to be the beginning of a much broader reform planned for the spring of 2016.

According to the 6+6+4 concept proposed by the then president of TVP, Janusz Daszczyński, each of the 16 regional channels was to broadcast 16 hours of regional and local programming daily, divided into two 6-hour blocks (7:00–13:00 and 13:00–19:00) and one 4-hour block (19:00–23:00). The six-hour block would be repeated in parts during the remaining hours, so that individual programs would appear two or three times per day. The plan also included hourly news flashes created under the Mojo concept (mobile journalism).

Within the 6+6+4 framework, several universal and supra-regional programs were also to be broadcast across all 16 regions, including Młodzież kontra... produced by TVP3 Kraków, Telekurier by TVP3 Poznań, and Kultowe rozmowy by TVP3 Bydgoszcz. However, in February 2016, TVP withdrew from the plan after Jacek Kurski became the new president.

On 26 June 2016, TVP3 broadcast the premiere of the oratorio “Z powodu mojego imienia” (Because of My Name) by Piotr Rubik and Zbigniew Książek, performed at the Kadzielnia Amphitheatre in Kielce. The concert was organized by the Papal Association Aid to the Church in Need.

In 2019, the Regional Channel (Regionalna Trójka) began broadcasting live matches of the Polish Second Football League.

=== 2020–2023 ===
From 30 March to 2 June 2020, due to the COVID-19 pandemic, TVP3 broadcast educational lessons for grades IV–VI of primary school as part of the School with TVP (Szkoła z TVP) project.

From 18 May 2020, the station began daily transmissions of the Chaplet of Divine Mercy from the Sanctuary of Divine Mercy in Łagiewniki, Kraków.

From 18 June 2020, the Studio Lotto program – live draws of number games and lotteries organized by Totalizator Sportowy – began airing on the nationwide feed of TVP3.

As part of the Winter Break with TVP campaign (Ferie z TVP), from 4 to 17 January 2021, (Note: Due to the increasing number of infections caused by COVID-19, the Minister of Education and Science issued a regulation under which the winter school break in the 2020/2021 school year took place nationwide at the same time) the common feed of TVP3 aired daily programming for schoolchildren aged 10 and above, from 8:00 to 13:00, without commercial breaks between shows. The lineup included films, series, and educational and lifestyle programs. Each day concluded with a family feature film broadcast in the evening.

On 4 October 2021, a new programming schedule launched, introducing shows such as Poranek TVP3 (TVP3 Morning), which featured live segments from regional branches, and thematic blocks focusing on gardening, cooking, women’s interests, and lifestyle advice. According to then–TVP3 director Paweł Gajewski, nearly 90% of all productions were to be commissioned from the regional branches to strengthen their position.

From 24 February 2022 (the start of the Russian invasion of Ukraine) until 2024, TVP3 also retransmitted the TVP Wilno news service Info Wilno.

On 15 September 2022, a new information block TVP3 Info was launched, broadcast Monday to Friday from 10:00 to 16:30, replacing most programs previously aired during those hours.

On 27 February 2023, TVP3 began cooperation with Polish Radio’s Channel 3 (Program III), rebroadcasting Salon polityczny Trójki (Political Salon of Trójka) on weekdays and Śniadanie w Trójce (Breakfast on Trójka) on Saturdays.

On 1 June 2023, all 16 regional TVP3 stations became available for free streaming via the TVP VOD website and mobile application.

In 2023, TVP3 organized a series of open-air summer concerts titled Roztańczona Polska – letnia trasa TVP (Dancing Poland – TVP Summer Tour). The tour began in Bogatynia on 14 May 2023 and continued through numerous cities, including Gorzów Wielkopolski (21 May), Stalowa Wola (28 May), Łomża (4 June), Gryfino (18 June), Łowicz (25 June), Ostrów Wielkopolski (2 July), Jaworzno (9 July), Władysławowo (16 July), Chełmno (23 July), Sochaczew (30 July), Zamość (6 August), Myślenice (13 August), Opole (20 August), Sandomierz (27 August), Iława (3 September), Šalčininkai (17 September), Daugavpils (24 September), Warsaw (30 September), and Chełm (8 October). The concert series featured performances by well-known Polish artists such as Karolina Stanisławczyk, Jakub Szmajkowski, Kombi, Weekend, Defis, Top Girls, Andrzej Rybiński, Capitan Folk, Topky, Łobuzy, Boys, Halina Frąckowiak, Stachursky, Camasutra, Weź Nie Pytaj, Masters, Felivers, Grupa Volt, Viki Gabor, Miły Pan, Czerwone Gitary, Mejk, Doda, Paulla, Kajra, Sławomir, Norbi, Kamil Bednarek, Daj To Głośniej, Skolim, Rafał Brzozowski, Marcin Siegieńczuk, Michał Wiśniewski, Piękni i Młodzi, Szpilki, Bajorek, Extazy, Playboys, Akcent, Jorrgus, and Milano.

=== Transition to HD broadcasting ===
In January 2018, TVP president Jacek Kurski announced in an interview with the weekly Wprost that regional branches of TVP would begin producing programs in HD quality. In March of the same year, he also announced the modernization of TVP’s broadcast vans to HD technology and the purchase of four new vans for the regional branches in Gdańsk, Katowice, Lublin, and Poznań.

On 28 February 2022, the TVP branches in Gdańsk, Lublin, and Poznań received new HD broadcast vans, which could be quickly upgraded to 4K quality, delivered by president Jacek Kurski. The vans were equipped with two replay stations, the latest Sony vision mixer, an advanced audio mixer (allowing, among other things, surround sound operation), and system safeguards that ensured continued operation even in case of failure. Connecting all four vans together enabled the broadcasting of events using up to 36 cameras simultaneously.

At that time, Paweł Gajewski, head of TVP3, also announced technological investments in all regional branches and their transition from SD to HD broadcasting. He stated that the shared network block (the common national programming of TVP3) would switch to HD production between the end of 2021 and the beginning of 2022. The transition was completed on 15 February 2022, when the shared TVP3 program and the Warsaw regional program began broadcasting in HD quality via cable networks, on the TVP Stream platform, and in the TVP GO app. Until 3 October 2022, they also operated on TVP’s test DVB-T2/HEVC multiplex.

On 20 November 2023, HD broadcasting was also launched on satellite platforms.

Local TVP3 programs were switched to the new HD picture standard in connection with Poland’s transition from DVB-T/MPEG-4 to DVB-T2/HEVC terrestrial broadcasting. Initially, this change was scheduled for 2022, but it was delayed due to the extension of MUX 3 broadcasting in the old standard until the end of 2023.

Finally, the change in picture quality standard took place in two stages in mid-December 2023, after which all regional branches began broadcasting in HD quality:

- Stage 1 (15 December 2023) – Western Poland: TVP3 Szczecin, Gdańsk, Gorzów Wielkopolski, Poznań, Bydgoszcz, Łódź, Wrocław, Opole, and Katowice.
- Stage 2 (19 December 2023) – Eastern Poland: TVP3 Lublin, Kraków, Warsaw, Rzeszów, Białystok, Kielce, and Olsztyn.

=== After 20 December 2023 ===
Due to changes in the management of Telewizja Polska, Polskie Radio, and the Polish Press Agency (PAP) introduced by the Minister of Culture and National Heritage Bartłomiej Sienkiewicz, on 20 December 2023, around midday, the TVP3 channel (both the shared block and regional branch programs) was suspended. During this time, TVP2’s signal was broadcast instead.

On 26 December 2023, after 10:00 a.m., TVP3’s shared block resumed broadcasting. On 28 December, local programming from the Kraków and Poznań branches returned, and in the following days, other regional centers gradually resumed broadcasting as well.

After the resumption of the shared programming, the TVP3 Info block and rebroadcasts of Radio Trójka’s current affairs programs were removed from the schedule.

== Availability ==
TVP3 channels are broadcast free of charge as part of the nationwide third multiplex of digital terrestrial television (MUX 3). They are also available in all cable networks and on digital satellite platforms (where only TVP3 Warszawa is offered), in accordance with the so-called must carry rule — a provision in the Broadcasting and Television Act that requires every television operator to offer seven mandatory channels. These include three public channels — TVP1, TVP2, and TVP3 — and four private ones — TVN, Polsat, TV4, and TV Puls.

=== Digital terrestrial television ===
On 27 October 2010, TVP’s regional branches began broadcasting their programs on MUX 3, within the local windows of TVP Info, and a year later also on MUX 1.

On 1 September 2013, regional programming moved to TVP Regionalna and began broadcasting exclusively on MUX 3, while TVP Info was available only on MUX 1 until 15 February 2014, when the channel was moved to MUX 3.

From 15 February to 3 October 2022, TVP3 Warsaw was available in HD quality on a test multiplex broadcast in the DVB-T2/HEVC standard.

=== Satellite transmission ===
On 9 January 2004, the TVP3 Warszawa became available on the Canal+ platform. On 2 February 2006, the same version began broadcasting via the Astra 2C satellite (later Astra 1KR) and was only partially encrypted, making the channel also accessible through FTA digital receivers. The Astra transmission, which by then carried the full-time news channel TVP Info, was shut down on 1 January 2015.

On 6 September 2013, TVP Regionalna (only the TVP Warsaw edition) joined Polsat Box as a new channel, and on 9 September it was also added to nc+, Telewizja na kartę, and Orange TV (TVP Info, in its new format, remained available on these platforms). On 2 January 2016, TVP3 replaced TVP Regionalna. On 20 November 2023, satellite transmission was upgraded to HD quality, along with the channel TVP Seriale.

Currently, the station (again, only TVP3 Warsaw) is available exclusively via the Hot Bird satellite on digital platform transponders.

=== Internet ===
Since 25 February 2013, all regional TVP channels have been available free of charge online through the TVP Stream website and app.

From 14 February 2022, they have also been accessible via the TVP GO app, available for iOS and Android devices.

On 1 June 2023, the signal of all 16 regional stations was also made available free of charge on the TVP VOD website and app.

== Broadcast hours of TVP3 local programming ==
Since 2 September 2024, local programming blocks of TVP’s regional branches have been broadcast for 5 hours daily — every day from 3:30 p.m. to 7:30 p.m., and from 9:00 p.m. to 10:00 p.m.

=== Former broadcast hours of TVP3 local programming ===
- From 2 January 2016 to 2 April 2018, regional branches aired their programs Monday to Friday from 7:00–8:15 a.m. and 5:30–10:15 p.m., and on weekends from 10:00–11:00 a.m. and 6:00–10:15 p.m. Local programming blocks were broadcast for 5 hours and 15 minutes daily.
- From 3 April 2018 to 3 October 2021, regional branches aired their programs Monday to Friday from 7:00–9:00 a.m., 12:30–1:00 p.m., 2:00–3:00 p.m., 5:30–8:00 p.m., and 9:00–9:30 p.m., and on weekends from 10:00 a.m.–12:00 p.m., 5:30–8:00 p.m., and 9:00–9:30 p.m. Local blocks lasted 6.5 hours on weekdays and 5 hours on weekends.
- From 4 October 2021 to 26 February 2023, regional branches aired their programs Monday to Friday from 8:00–10:00 a.m., 12:30–12:45 p.m., (Note: Only the regional branches in Lublin, Łódź, Opole, and Warsaw) 2:30–2:45 p.m., 4:30–4:45 p.m., 5:00–5:30 p.m., 6:00–8:20 p.m., (Note: Until 24 February 2022, the programming block ended 10 minutes later (at 8:30 p.m.)) and 9:30–9:45 p.m., and on weekends from 10:00 a.m.–12:00 p.m., 12:30–12:45 p.m., (Note: Only the regional branches in Lublin, Łódź, Opole, and Warsaw) 2:30–2:45 p.m., 4:30–4:45 p.m., 5:00–5:30 p.m., 6:00–8:30 p.m., and 9:30–9:45 p.m. Local blocks lasted 6 hours and 15 minutes on weekdays and 5 hours and 50 minutes on weekends.
- From 27 February 2023 to 20 December 2023, regional branches aired their programs Monday to Friday from 8:00–10:00 a.m., 11:30–11:35 a.m., 12:30–12:45 p.m., 1:30–1:35 p.m., 2:30–2:45 p.m., 4:30–4:45 p.m., 5:00–8:00 p.m., 8:30–8:35 p.m., and 9:25–10:00 p.m., and on weekends from 10:00 a.m.–12:00 p.m., 12:30–12:45 p.m., (Note: Only the regional branches in Lublin, Łódź, Opole, and Warsaw) 2:30–2:45 p.m., 4:30–4:45 p.m., 5:00–8:00 p.m., and 9:25–10:00 p.m. Local blocks lasted 6 hours and 30 minutes on weekdays and 6 hours and 5 minutes on weekends.
- From 25 January 2024 (Note: Due to changes in the management of TVP, on 20 December 2023, the TVP3 broadcast (including both the common block and the regional branch programming) was suspended. Starting from 27 December, the local programming blocks gradually began to return. On 25 January 2024, the Kielce branch was the last to resume broadcasting; therefore, this date is considered the final completion of the reestablishment of TVP3’s local programming schedule.) to 1 September 2024, regional branches aired their programs from 8:00–10:00 a.m. (or 10:00 a.m.–12:00 p.m. on weekends), 2:30–3:00 p.m., 4:30–4:45 p.m., 5:00–8:00 p.m., and 9:25–10:00 p.m. Local programming blocks lasted 6 hours and 20 minutes daily.

== Programs broadcast in the TVP3 common block ==
Apart from its own productions, TVP3 also airs reruns of shows from TVP1, TVP2, and TVP Info, as well as Polish TV series, soap operas (mainly Turkish), broadcasts of state ceremonies, Holy Masses, religious programs, and also short advisory shows.

Since 18 May 2020, the Chaplet of Divine Mercy has been broadcast daily from the Sanctuary in Łagiewniki, Kraków. Since 18 June 2020, Studio Lotto has been broadcast live — the evening draws of number games and lotteries organized by Totalizator Sportowy.

=== Own productions (as of spring 2025) ===
==== News Programs ====
- Dziennik Regionów (Regional Journal, since 2013)

==== Current affairs and intervention programs ====
- Gość regionów (Guest of the Regions, since 2024) – commentary on current national events.
- Telekurier (Telecourier, since 2000) – TVP3’s intervention magazine, produced by the TVP Poznań branch.
- Ktokolwiek widział, ktokolwiek wie (Whoever Saw, Whoever Knows, 2013–2016, revived since 2018) – program about missing persons, produced by TVP3 Katowice.

==== Agricultural Programs ====
- Agrobiznes (AgriBusiness)
- Agrobiznes Info (since 2024)
- Agropogoda (AgriWeather, broadcast since 2021 also on TVP3) – weather forecast for farmers.

==== Society ====
- Spotkania w świecie ciszy (Meetings in the World of Silence, since 2018) – magazine for the Deaf community, produced by TVP3 Katowice.
- Telenowyny (TeleNews) – news program in Ukrainian with simultaneous Polish translation, aimed at Ukraine’s minority in Poland and viewers interested in Ukrainian issues.
- O milimetr (By a Millimeter, since 2025) – magazine presenting the activities of NGOs.
- Wiek to tylko liczba (Age Is Just a Number, since 2023) – program promoting senior citizens’ activity.

==== Advisory programs ====
- Przepis na dziś (Recipe for Today, since 2022) – quick recipes prepared by TVP3 journalists and their guests.

==== Documentary and Reportage ====
- Całkiem niezła historia (Quite a Good Story, since 2020) – series presenting the best reports by TVP journalists.
- Kryminalna Siódemka (The Criminal Seven, since 2018) – program showcasing seven major criminal cases that shocked Poland.

==== Cooking programs ====
- Rączka gotuje (Rączka Cooks, since 2013) – weekly culinary show by Silesian chef Remigiusz Rączka, featuring recipes for traditional Silesian dishes; produced by TVP3 Katowice.

==== Sports ====
- Pierwsza Druga w Trójce (First and Second in the Third, since 2025) – weekly summary of matches in Poland’s first and second football leagues.

==== Culture and Art ====
- Piosenka dla Ciebie (A Song for You, since 2020) – musical dedication concert, produced by TVP3 Lublin.

=== Programs no longer broadcast on TVP3 (incomplete list) ===
- Dziennik Regionów – Tematy Dnia (Regional Journal – Topics of the Day, 2018–2021)
- Express Regionów Flesz (Regions Express Flash, 2023)
- Poranek TVP3 (TVP3 Morning, 2021–2022)
- TVP3 Info (2022–2023)
- Układ (The Deal, 2021) – hosted by Miłosz Kłeczek
- Na ludowo (Folk Style, 2021–2022) – a program promoting regional folklore and folk culture
- Ona (She, 2021–2022) – women’s lifestyle magazine
- Welcome to Poland (2021–2022) – about foreigners living permanently in Poland
- Gwiazdy od szafy (Stars from the Wardrobe, 2021–2022) – interviews with celebrities about fashion, style, and important outfits for them. Produced by TVP3 Kielce
- Zielnik regionalny (Regional Herbarium, 2021)
- Zimowy ogród (Winter Garden, 2021)
- Historie motocyklowe (Motorcycle Stories, 2021)
- Moto Lady (2021)
- Krótko o kulturze (Briefly About Culture, 2021) – information about the latest cultural events, presenting Polish cultural creators in an anecdotal way, and showing places in Poland in the context of interesting stories.
- Szlak przydrożnych kapliczek (The Roadside Chapels Route, 2021)
- Ratownicy (Rescuers, 2021–2022) – the camera follows three protagonists, showing them at work and in personal life.
- Projekt Policja (Project Police, 2021–2022) – a program showing police work through the stories of individual officers. Each episode features a different police unit: counterterrorists, water police, criminal police, mounted police, SPEED group, or motorcyclists.
- Ochotnicy (Volunteers, 2021–2022) – a program about people who work in Volunteer Fire Departments.
- Mroczne dzielnice (Dark Districts, 2021–2022)
- Przyroda – wędka – przygoda (Nature – Rod – Adventure, 2022) – a program presenting the charm of fishing spots in Poland.
- Wyprodukowano w Polsce (Made in Poland, 2021–2022) – a program presenting historical Polish inventions that changed the world history.
- Bazary i bazarki (Markets and Market Stalls, 2021–2022) – a program showing what can be found in Polish markets and bazaars. Each week, viewers learn about the story of one character connected with fashion, cuisine, and antiques. Produced by TVP3 Katowice.
- Słodka kuchnia Pszczółek (The Sweet Kitchen of the Pszczółka Sisters, 2021–2022) – Justyna and Dorota Pszczółka – baking enthusiasts, sisters, culinary bloggers, and participants of the 2nd edition of Bake Off – Ale Ciacho!. In the program, they present recipes for delicious and impressive cakes or desserts. Produced by TVP3 Katowice.
- Na tropie przypraw. Pikantnie i słodko (On the Trail of Spices: Spicy and Sweet, 2021–2022) – travel and culinary show; produced by TVP3 Kraków
- Kuchenne recepty (Kitchen Prescriptions, 2021–2022) – health and cooking guide by Dr. Michał Mularczyk
- Echa dnia (Echoes of the Day, 2002–2007, 2013–2023) – commentary on current national events
- Głos regionów. Interwencje (Voice of the Regions: Interventions, 2013–2021, later 2021–2023) – investigative reports on issues affecting local communities.
- Tygodnik polityczny (Political Weekly, 2018–2023) – weekly political and social summary in the country.
- Regionalny magazyn sportowy (Regional Sports Magazine, 2019–2023) – summary of the most important sports events, with particular emphasis on Polish athletes’ achievements, produced by TVP3 Wrocław.
- Śniadanie samorządowe (Self-Government Breakfast, 2022–2023) – a political talk show on topics related to the functioning of local governments.
- Magazyn Ekspresu Reporterów (Reporters’ Express Magazine, 2023) – social reportage and studio discussions. Guests invited to the studio comment on the materials shown.
- Agrorozmowa (AgroTalk, 2022–2023) – a daily current affairs and informational program about agricultural topics, produced by TVP3 Katowice.
- Starszaki (The Oldies, 2019–2023) – in the program, older and younger people meet. It presents inspiring people, interesting places, and encourages viewers to go out; produced by TVP3 Poznań.
- Debata Senior (Senior Debate, 2023) – a talk show discussing current social and economic issues concerning Polish seniors: health, future, finances, sports, and education.
- Na zdrowie. Poradnik medyczny TVP3 (To Your Health: TVP3 Medical Guide, since 2021) – a medical program
- Telezwierz (TeleAnimal, 2021–2023) – a program presenting various issues related to both domestic and wild animals. It includes educational and advisory elements, as well as curiosities.
- Rozmowy bardzo kulturalne (Very Cultural Conversations, since 2021) – interviews by Danuta Holecka with cultural figures
- Poczytalnia (The Reading Room, since 2021) – program about books, produced by TVP3 Kielce
- Café Piosenka (Song Café, 2019–2023) – hosted by Ryszard Makowski
- Qulszoł – kulinarne potyczki (Cool Show – Culinary Duels, 2021–2023) – a program where Women’s Rural Circles compete with each other. The participants present two traditional regional dishes evaluated by: culinary critic Walentyna Jałocha and chef Bartłomiej Witkowski. The contestants also tell stories and traditions of their hometowns. Produced by TVP3 Bydgoszcz.
- Agrobiznes Extra (AgriBusiness Extra, 2021–2023)
- Z miłości do zwierząt (Out of Love for Animals, 2023) – each episode by Kinga Wasilewska tells intertwined stories of four animal shelters located in different parts of Poland; produced by TVP3 Bydgoszcz
- Zamknięty świat (Closed World, 2021–2023) – stories of people living or working in prisons; produced by TVP3 Bydgoszcz
- Masz prawo (You Have the Right, 2022–2024) – an advisory program on legal topics. The host, Anna Grabowska, invites legal professionals to the studio to answer viewers’ questions and concerns.
- Składka. Emerytura. Przyszłość (Contribution. Pension. Future., 2022–2024) – an advisory and informational program on social insurance issues.
- Rola życia (The Role of a Lifetime, 2022–2024) – interviews with actors hosted by Laura Łącz
- Dobrego dnia (Have a Good Day, 2024) – TVP3’s morning show
- Express Regionów (Regions Express, 2021–2024)
- Igrzyska w Regionach (Olympics in the Regions, 2021–2024) – an educational program presenting profiles of Polish Olympians, their achievements, records, and important moments in their professional and personal lives.
- W dobrej wierze (In Good Faith, 2020–2024) – religious magazine produced by TVP3 Kraków
- Wiosna/Lato/Jesień na RODOS (Spring/Summer/Autumn at RODOS, 2021–2023) – about community gardeners across Poland, produced by TVP3 Bydgoszcz.

== Regional branches ==
- TVP3 Białystok
- TVP3 Bydgoszcz
- TVP3 Gdańsk
- TVP3 Gorzów Wielkopolski
- TVP3 Katowice
- TVP3 Kielce
- TVP3 Kraków
- TVP3 Lublin
- TVP3 Łódź
- TVP3 Olsztyn
- TVP3 Opole
- TVP3 Poznań
- TVP3 Rzeszów
- TVP3 Szczecin
- TVP3 Warszawa
- TVP3 Wrocław

== Logos and identities ==
TVP Regionalna (1994–2002)
Period of use	Description	Image
5 September 1994 – Autumn 2000	The then-current TVP logo (used from 1992 to 2003), with the word Regionalna ("Regional") written in italics underneath.	
TVP3 Regionalna (2000–2007)
Autumn 2000 – 2001	On the left, there were stripes in the colors of the then-current TVP design (these colors were discontinued in 2003). Next to it was the broadcaster’s logo used at that time. On the right side was the number 3. The stripes and the number 3 were connected by a "skate-like" shape, under the lower part of which the word Regionalna was placed. During the use of this logo, several regional centers—Kraków, Łódź, Szczecin, Warsaw, and Wrocław—attached their own traditional emblems onto the stripes or replaced the stripes with them.	
2001 – 6 March 2003	A logo similar to the previous one, but without the "skate" element and with the Regionalna inscription extended. The practice of inserting local center emblems was maintained.	
7 March 2003 – 5 October 2007	The TVP logo on a green background, with the number 3 beside it. On screen, the logo appeared semi-transparent.	
TVP Info (2007–2013)
6 October 2007 – 31 August 2013	A red "TVP" inscription within a gray gradient frame on a white background. Next to it, a white "INFO" inscription on a red background. From 1 September 2013, TVP Info became an independent, 24-hour news channel, continuing to use the same logo until 30 September 2024. On screen, the logo was displayed in the bottom-left corner.	
TVP Regionalna (2013–2016)
1 September 2013 – 1 January 2016	The TVP logo on a green background, with the word Regionalna in the same color underneath.	
1 September 2013 – 31 August 2014	The TVP logo on a green background, with a smaller word "regionalna" (in lowercase) on the right side, in the same color.	
TVP3 (from 2016 onward)
From 2 January 2016	A logo similar to that used between 2003–2007, but the background color is navy blue instead of green. On 14 February 2022, the on-screen logo was reduced in size.	

== See also ==
- Telewizja Polska
- Television in Poland
