= Rachocin Transmitter =

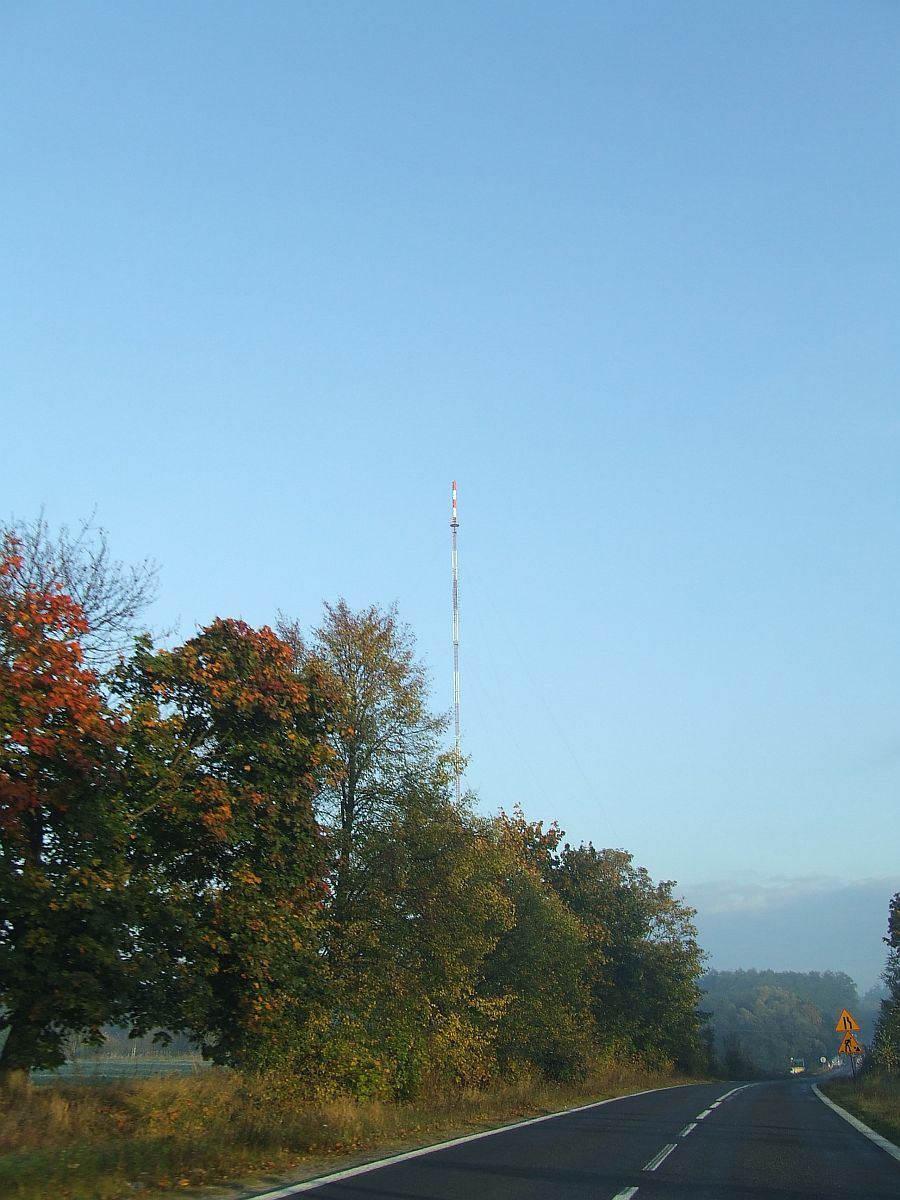
- Interactive map of the Rachocin Transmitter area

General information
- Status: Completed
- Type: TV Mast
- Location: Rachocin, Poland

Height
- Height: 261 m (856.30 ft)

Rachocin Transmitter
- Coordinates: 52°53′28″N 19°39′42″E
- Voivodeship: Masovian Voivodeship
- County: Sierpc County
- Gmina: Rachocin

Radio-Television Transmitting Centre Rachocin, situated by Sierpc/Rachocin on the north-west Masovian Voivodeship. Is a 261-metre guyed steel mast.

The mast was built to the purpose of the broadcasting of a radio signal and television on the large area. Under the reach of this RTCN a north-western part Masovian Voivodeship and an eastern part Kuyavian-Pomeranian Voivodeship, are including such cities as: Sierpc, Płock, Lipno, Rypin, Włocławek, Toruń, Ciechanów, Brodnica, or Działdowo, Lidzbark Warmiński and Mława. Is an owner from EmiTel company.

== Transmitted Programmes ==
=== Digital television MPEG-4 ===
Multiplex Number	Programme in Multiplex	Frequency	Channel	Power ERP	Polarisation	Antenna Diagram	Modulation
Multiplex 1	TVP1; Stopklatka TV; TVP ABC; TV Trwam; Eska TV; TTV; Polo TV; ATM Rozrywka	506 MHz	25	100 kW	Horizontal	ND	64 QAM
Multiplex 2	Polsat; TVN; TV4; TV Puls; TVN 7; Puls 2; TV6; Super Polsat	762 MHz	57	100 kW	Horizontal	ND	64 QAM
Multiplex 3	TVP1 HD; TVP2 HD; TVP Warszawa; TVP Kultura; TVP Historia; TVP Polonia; TVP Rozrywka; TVP Info	618 MHz	39	100 kW	Horizontal	ND	64 QAM

=== FM Radio ===
Program	Frequency	Power ERP	Polarisation	Antenna Diagram
Polskie Radio Program I	92,20 MHz	60 kW	Horizontal	ND
RMF FM	94,30 MHz	60 kW	Horizontal	ND
Polskie Radio Program III	96,10 MHz	60 kW	Horizontal	ND
Radio ZET	97,30 MHz	60 kW	Horizontal	ND
Polskie Radio Program II	98,10 MHz	2,50 kW	Horizontal	ND
Radio Dla Ciebie	101,90 MHz	60 kW	Horizontal	ND
Radio Maryja	106,30 MHz	60 kW	Horizontal	ND

== See also ==
- List of masts
