= Tylko Muzyka =

- Country: Poland
- Broadcast area: National
- Headquarters: Warsaw

Programming
- Language: Polish
- Picture format: 4:3 576i

Ownership
- Owner: Telewizja Polska
- Sister channels: TVP1; TVP2; TVP Regionalna; TV Polonia

History
- Launched: 30 March 1997; 29 years ago
- Closed: 15 February 1998; 28 years ago

Tylko Muzyka (lit. 'Nothing But Music') was Telewizja Polska's first theme channel, operational from 30 March 1997 to 15 February 1998. The channel employed digital encryption and was available on satellite, as well as some cable companies, who converted it to analog.

== History ==
The channel was the second Polish-language music channel to launch after Atomic TV, targeting the 15-35 demographic, airing a wide variety of genres, from jazz to classical music, on a 24/7 basis. Programs included national and international charts, as well as host-based programs, with names such as Kuba Wojewódzki ("Premie i premiery"), Rafał Baran ("Alternatywa"), Paweł Sztompke and Paweł Sito ("Pop wieczorek"), Marek Wiernik ("Rock bez granic"), Robert Leszczyński and Grzegorz Hofffmann ("Za ostatni grosz"). It closed on 15 February 1998 due to technical problems in the satellite signal of TV Polonia; after that, the international channel took over its digital satellite frequency. Moreover, the channel had a limited reach, despite TVP promoting the channel heavily in promos on its other channels and in the series Złotopolscy. There was also pressure from politicians suggestin that TVP should be refrained from opening theme channels, including the creation of a news channel before TVN24.

In 2022, Jacek Kurski pushed for TVP to launch a new music channel, TVP Muzyka, but the plan was quickly abandoned.
