= Święty Krzyż TV Tower =

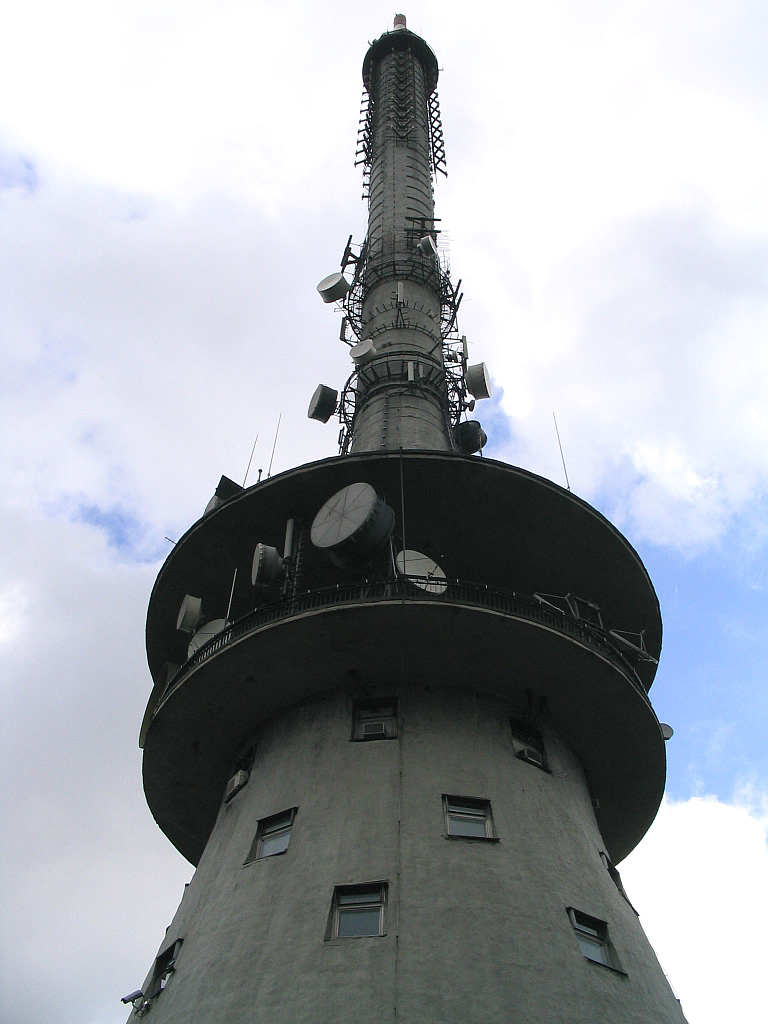
- Interactive map of the Święty Krzyż TV Tower area

General information
- Status: Completed
- Type: Concrete Tower
- Location: Szklana Huta, Poland
- Coordinates: 50°51′37″N 21°02′55″E
- Completed: 17 February 1966

Height
- Height: 157 m (515.09 ft)

Święty Krzyż TV Tower (Polish: Radiowo-Telewizyjne Centrum Nadawcze Święty Krzyż) is the tallest free-standing TV tower in Poland (Taller architectural structures in Poland are guyed masts or highrise buildings and chimneys equipped with antennas). Święty Krzyż TV Tower, which was built in 1966, is a 157-metre-tall (515 ft) concrete TV tower situated near the monastery on Łysa Góra. Święty Krzyż TV Tower is not accessible for tourists. The hyperbolic-shaped basement floors resemble those of the Ochsenkopf TV Tower in Germany.

== Transmitted programs ==
The tower is used for transmitting the following FM and TV programs:

=== FM radio ===
Program	Frequency MHz	ERP kW	Polarisation	Antenna Diagram around (ND) / directional (D)
RMF FM	88.20	120	Vertical	ND
Radio eM Kielce	91.30	0,5	Vertical	ND
Polskie Radio Program I	92.30	60	Vertical	ND
Polskie Radio Program III	96.20	60	Vertical	ND
Polskie Radio Kielce	101.40	120	Vertical	ND
Radio ZET	105.30	60	Vertical	ND
RMF MAXXX	106.50	20	Vertical	ND
Radio Maryja	107.20	120	Vertical	ND

=== Digital radio ===
Multiplex	Programs in Multiplex	Frequency MHz	Channel	ERP kW	Polarisation	Antenna Diagram around (ND) / directional (D)	Bit Rate [MBit/s]
MUX DAB+	Polskie Radio Program I; Polskie Radio Program II; Polskie Radio Program III; Polskie Radio Program IV; Polskie Radio Kielce; Folk Radio; Polskie Radio 24; Polskie Radio Chopin; Polskie Radio Dzieciom; Polskie Radio Dla Zagranicy	215.072	10D	10	Vertical	ND	128

=== Digital Television DVB-T2 ===
Multiplex	Programs in Multiplex	Frequency MHz	Channel	ERP kW	Polarisation	Antenna Diagram around (ND) / directional (D)	Modulation	FEC
MUX 1	Antena HD; Fokus TV; Stopklatka TV; TV Trwam; Eska TV; TTV; Polo TV	546	30	100	Horizontal	ND	HEVC 256 - QAM	1/128
MUX 2	Polsat; TVN; TV4; TV Puls; TVN 7; Puls 2; TV6; Super Polsat	658	44	100	Horizontal	ND	HEVC 256- QAM	1/128
MUX 3	TVP1 HD; TVP2 HD; TVP3 Kielce; TVP Historia; TVP Sport; TVP Info HD	682	47	150	Horizontal	ND	HEVC 256 - QAM	1/128
MUX 4	Eleven Sports 1; Eleven Sports 2; Eurosport 1; Eurosport 2; Polsat News; Polsat Sport; Polsat Sport Extra; TVN Turbo; TVN 24; Wydarzenia 24	642	42	100	Horizontal	ND	HEVC 256 - QAM	1/128
MUX 6	Alfa TVP; Belsat TV; TVP ABC; TVP Dokument; TVP Kobieta; TVP Kultura; TVP Nauka; TVP Polonia; TVP Rozrywka	530	28	100	Horizontal	ND	HEVC 256 - QAM	1/128
MUX 8	Metro TV; Zoom TV; Nowa TV; WP	198,5	8	10	Vertical	ND	64 - QAM	5/6

== See also ==
- List of towers
