= TVP3 Kielce =

Polish TV network

- Logo used since from January 2016

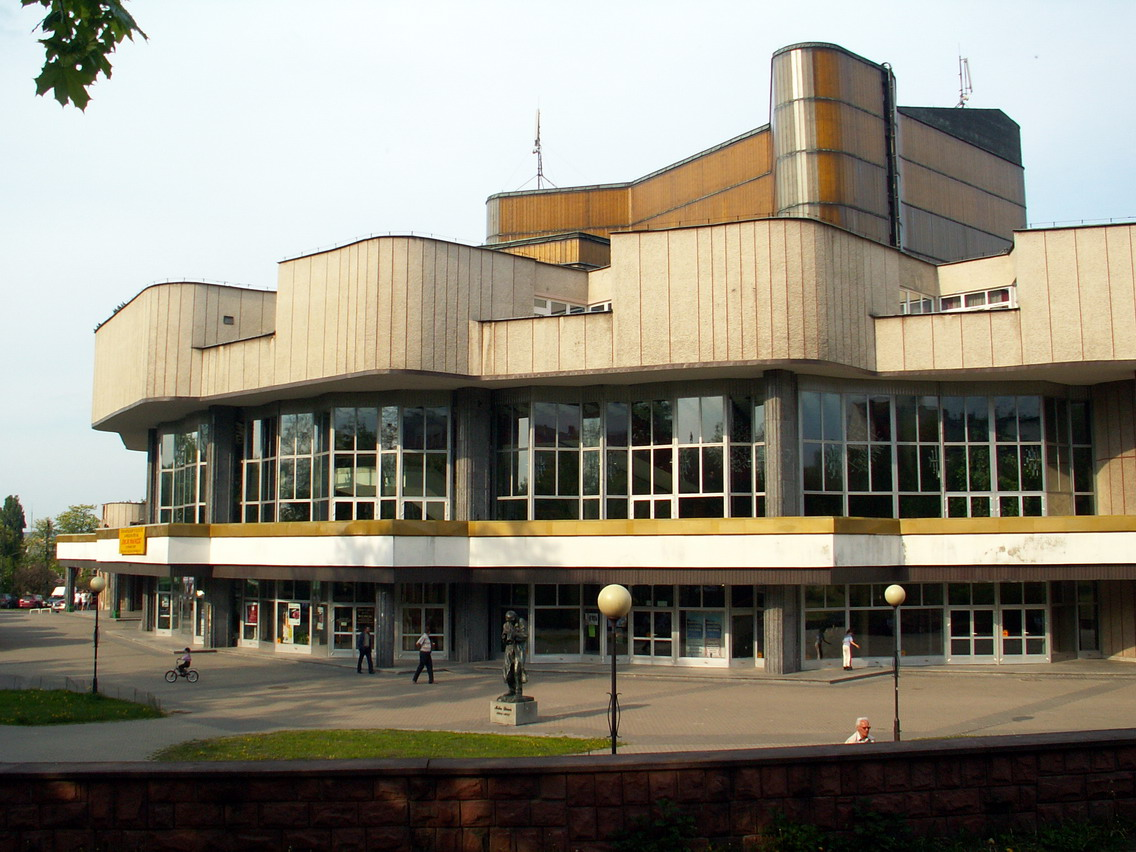
- Kieleckie Centrum Kultury - Headquarters of TVP3 Kielce
- Świętokrzyskie Voivodeship; Poland
- City: Kielce
- Channels: Digital: 47 (UHF); Virtual: 3

Programming
- Language: Polish
- Affiliations: TVP

Ownership
- Owner: Telewizja Polska

History
- Founded: Split from TVP3 Kraków
- First air date: 1 January 1995

Links
- Website: https://kielce.tvp.pl/

TVP3 Kielce is a regional branch of the TVP, Poland's public television broadcaster, with the registered office located in Kielce. It serves Kielce and the entire Świętokrzyskie Voivodeship.

== Own programs ==
TVP3 Kielce is broadcasting own programmes into composition which news programmes are accessing from the region, press, cultural-scientific, community and entertaining programs:

- "Informacje" (Information) - main news bulletin giving to the message from Kielce and of Region
- "Bez Demagogii" (Without the Demagoguery) - weekly program with the participation of politicians and leaders of political parties
- "R jak Reportaż" (R like the documentary) - program in which ordinary people and his problems, but also his passions and initiatives are a hero.
- "7 Minut" (7 Minutes) - interview concerning the current situation in the city and the region.
- "Studio Balkon" (Studio Balcony) - morning feature programme.
- "Magazyn kulturalny Słup" (Cultural magazine Pole) - a cultural magazine is presenting, comments and cultural announcements from the Świętokrzyskie Voivodeship.
- "Czas na zdrowie" (Time for the health) - program for enthusiasts of a healthy lifestyle.

== Broadcast area ==
TVP3 Kielce is transmitted throughout Świętokrzyskie Voivodeship and in parts of the adjacent voivodeships. The transmitter of 150 kW situated on top of Święty Krzyż mountain broadcasts the signal within a radius of 150 kilometres.

== Digital terrestrial transmitters MUX 3 in Świętokrzyskie Voivodeship ==
Location of transmitters	Channel	Frequency	PowerERP
Święty Krzyż TV Tower	47	682 MHz	150 kW
Kielce Power Station	47	682 MHz	9 kW
SLR Busko-Zdrój	47	682 MHz	7 kW
Dobromierz Transmitter	47	682 MHz	5 kW
Sandomierz/Mokoszyńska	47	682 MHz	0,250 kW
Starachowice/Martenowska	47	682 MHz	0,055 kW

== Logo history ==
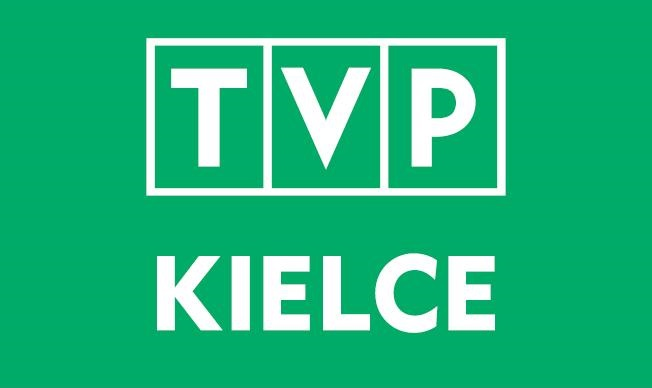
2001 - 2003	2003 – 2007	2007 – 2013	2013 – 2016	2016 –
