= Telewizja Polska =

Polish public service broadcaster

Telewizja Polska S.A. w likwidacji

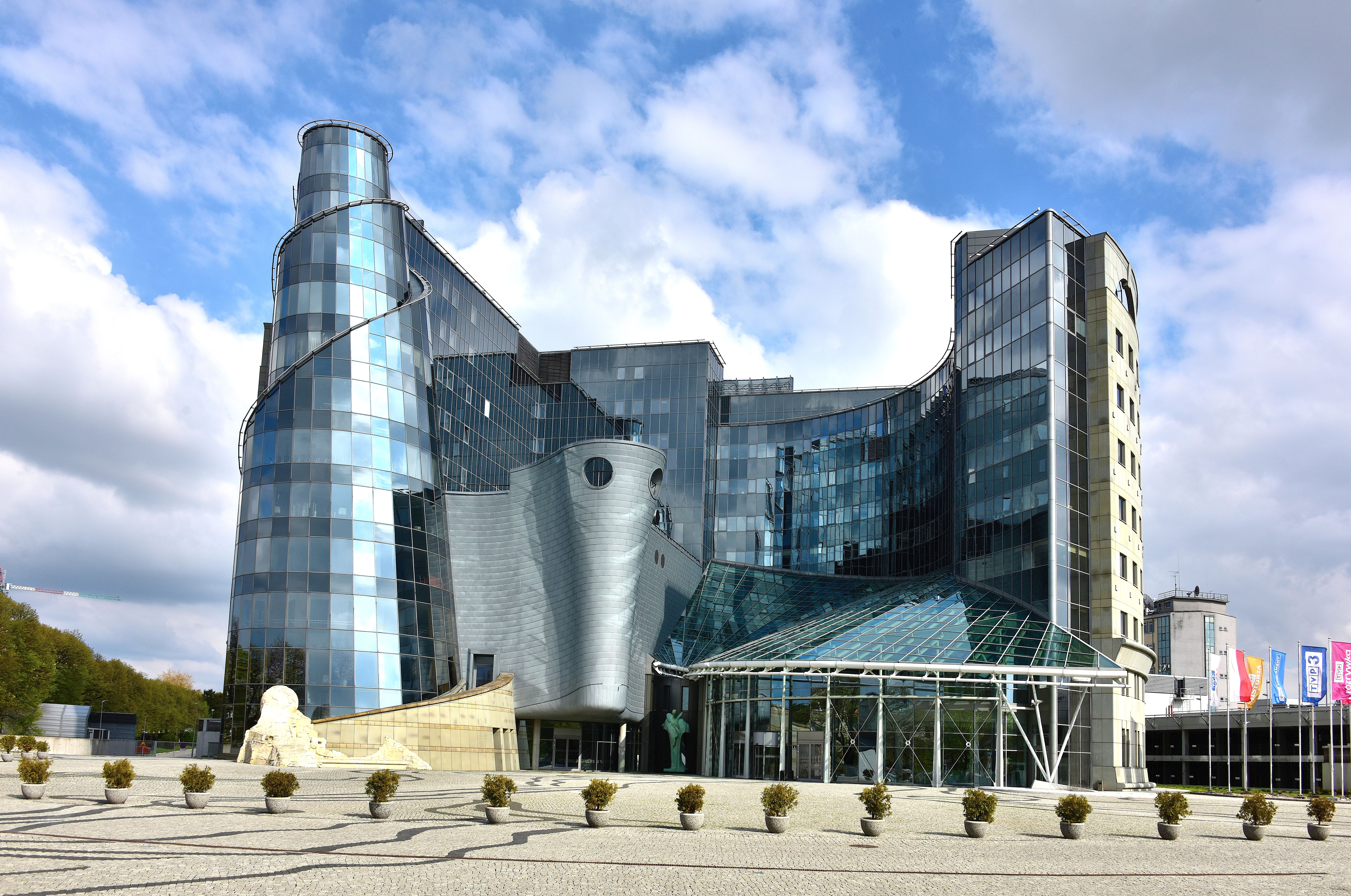
- Headquarters in Warsaw
- Type: Broadcast television
- Country: Poland
- Availability: Nationwide; International
- Motto: Bądźmy razem (lit. 'Let's be together')
- TV stations: TVP1; TVP2; TVP Info; TVP Sport
- Headquarters: Jana Pawła Woronicza 17, Mokotów, Warsaw, Poland
- Owner: State Treasury of Poland
- Launch date: 25 October 1952; 74 years ago
- Liquidator: Daniel Gorgosz
- CEO: Tomasz Sygut
- Supervisory Board chairman: Piotr Zemła
- Official website: tvp.pl

Telewizja Polska S.A. (Polish: [tɛlɛˈvizja ˈpɔlska]; TVP), also known in English as Polish Television, is a public service broadcaster in Poland, founded in 1952. It is the oldest and largest Polish television network.

After 2015, when the right-wing populist Law and Justice (PiS) party won the Polish parliamentary election, TVP progressively aligned with the speaking points of the PiS government. In the run-up to the 2023 Polish parliamentary election, TVP was designated as a "propaganda arm" of PiS by European media and as "a factory of hate" by the Polish opposition. However, after the electoral victory of the opposition party the Civic Platform in 2023, a newly-appointed Minister of Culture began a restructuring of the broadcaster and its news segment. On 27 December 2023, the Minister of Culture and National Heritage, due to the President's veto on the financing of the company, placed it in liquidation.

== Timeline of Polish TV service ==
- 1935: The PIT (Państwowy Instytut Telekomunikacyjny - National Telecommunications Institute) starts working together with Polish Radio on establishing the first television service.
- 1937: Completion of the first black-and-white broadcasting station.
- 1938: Experimental channel launched, regular programming scheduled for 1941.
- 1939: All equipment destroyed by the German Army.
- 1947: PIT resumes work on television broadcasting.
- 1951: First Polish telecast following the Second World War.
- 1952: Beginning of regular programming.
- 1957: Broadcast of the first sports event; a boxing match Skra Warsaw – Gwardia Łódź
- 1958: Newscast Dziennik Telewizyjny ("Journal") is founded.
- 1970: TVP2 is founded.
- 1971: Start of colour broadcasting (in SECAM).
- 1989: Introduction of a teletext service.
- 1989: Dziennik Telewizyjny is replaced by Wiadomości ("News").
- 1992: Telewizja Polska Spółka Akcyjna comes into existence upon the separation of television and radio public broadcasting by an act of parliament.
- 1992: TVP Polonia starts test transmissions.
- 1993: Polskie Radio i Telewizja (Polish Radio and Television) joins the European Broadcasting Union as an active member (regrouping of OIRT and UER).
- 1994: Beginning of the change over from SECAM to PAL for all channels except TVP1.
- 1995: Change over from SECAM to PAL was completed as TVP1 moved to this colour standard.
- 2003: Change of TVP logotype.
- 2009: New main headquarters building opens in Warsaw.
- 2013: Analogue terrestrial television is switched-off.
- 2020: TVP eSzkoła, TVP Kultura 2 and TVP Dokument are founded.
- 2021: TVP Kobieta is founded.
- 2022: TVP ABC 2 is founded, replacing TVP eSzkoła.
- 2022: Alfa TVP is founded, targeting older children.
- 2023: TVP Info was suspended for a few days and the news operation was restructured (hiatus from 20 to 29 December 2023). TVP3 was on hiatus from 20 to 26 December 2023. TVP Parlament was on hiatus from 20 December 2023 to 8 January 2024. TVP World was on hiatus from 20 December 2023 to 11 March 2024.
- 2023: Newscast Wiadomości was replaced by 19.30.

== History ==
=== Pre-war period ===
The forerunner of television in Poland should be Jan Szczepanik, called the "Polish Edison", who in 1897 patented at the British Patent Office (British patent no. 5031). as the "telectroscope" defined as an "apparatus for reproducing images at a distance using electricity".

In 1929, Stefan Manczarski constructed a mechanical television apparatus based on two synchronously rotating Nipkow disks, on the transmitting and receiving sides. The television signal was transmitted via an electric cable. The device only transmitted a still image. Stefan Manczarski called his invention "a method of television transmission of images via wire and radio."

Experiments were also conducted by a team of scientists and engineers in 1931 at the Polish Radio station in Katowice. Transmitting and receiving equipment according to the JL Baird system using a Nipkow shield. Both mechanical television transmitting and receiving devices were driven by one common engine, ensuring full synchronization of both units. The signal was transmitted by cable within one laboratory. The experimental work was led by Eng. Twardawa.

Only later, work on launching a television station in Poland began in 1935 in Warsaw at the State Telecommunications Institute and Polish Radio. In 1937, an experimental television station began operating on the sixteenth floor of the Prudential skyscraper. Władysław Cetner became the station manager.

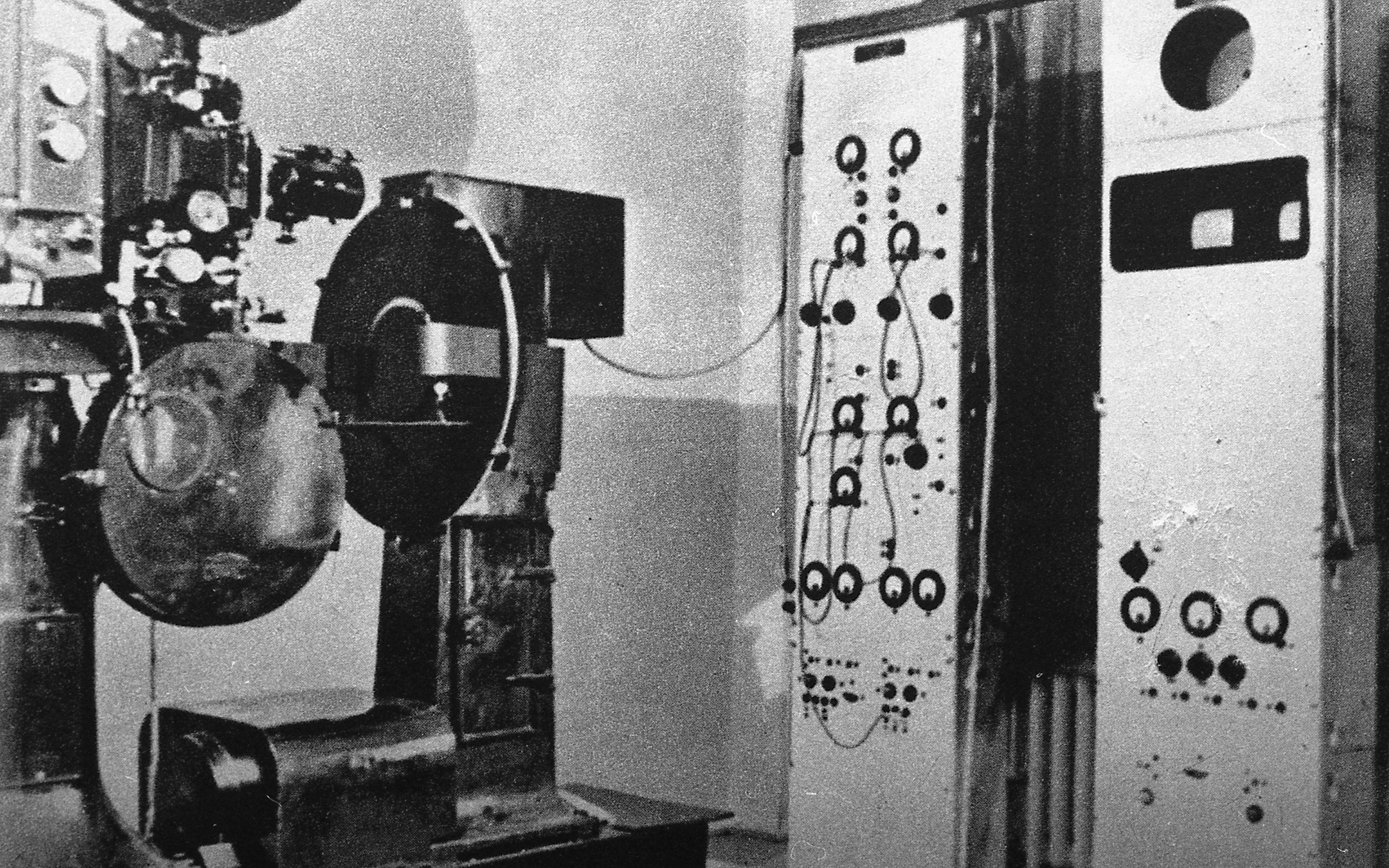
Equipment analyzing the image at the PR Experimental Television Station from 1939 in Warsaw

In 1937, an audio transmitter was installed, and at the beginning of 1938, a video transmitter. Moreover, in 1938, a 16-meter-high tower structure was built on the roof of the "skyscraper", as it was called, on which a tubular mast for an 11-meter-high transmitting antenna was mounted. The antenna was located 87 m above the ground, which ensured reception of the video signal at a distance of 20 km and audio signal 30 km from the transmitting antenna. Test television broadcasts took place on 5 October 1938 and 26 August 1939 in Warsaw with the participation of Mieczysław Fogg.

It was a mechanical television station broadcasting under the 120-line standard. It carried, among others: a telecine film "Barbara Radziwiłłówna" with Jadwiga Smosarska in the main role, and at that time work on 343-line electronic television was in progress. The development of research on television, which was very advanced (the launch of a permanent service was expected in 1940), was interrupted by the outbreak of World War II.

=== Post-war period ===
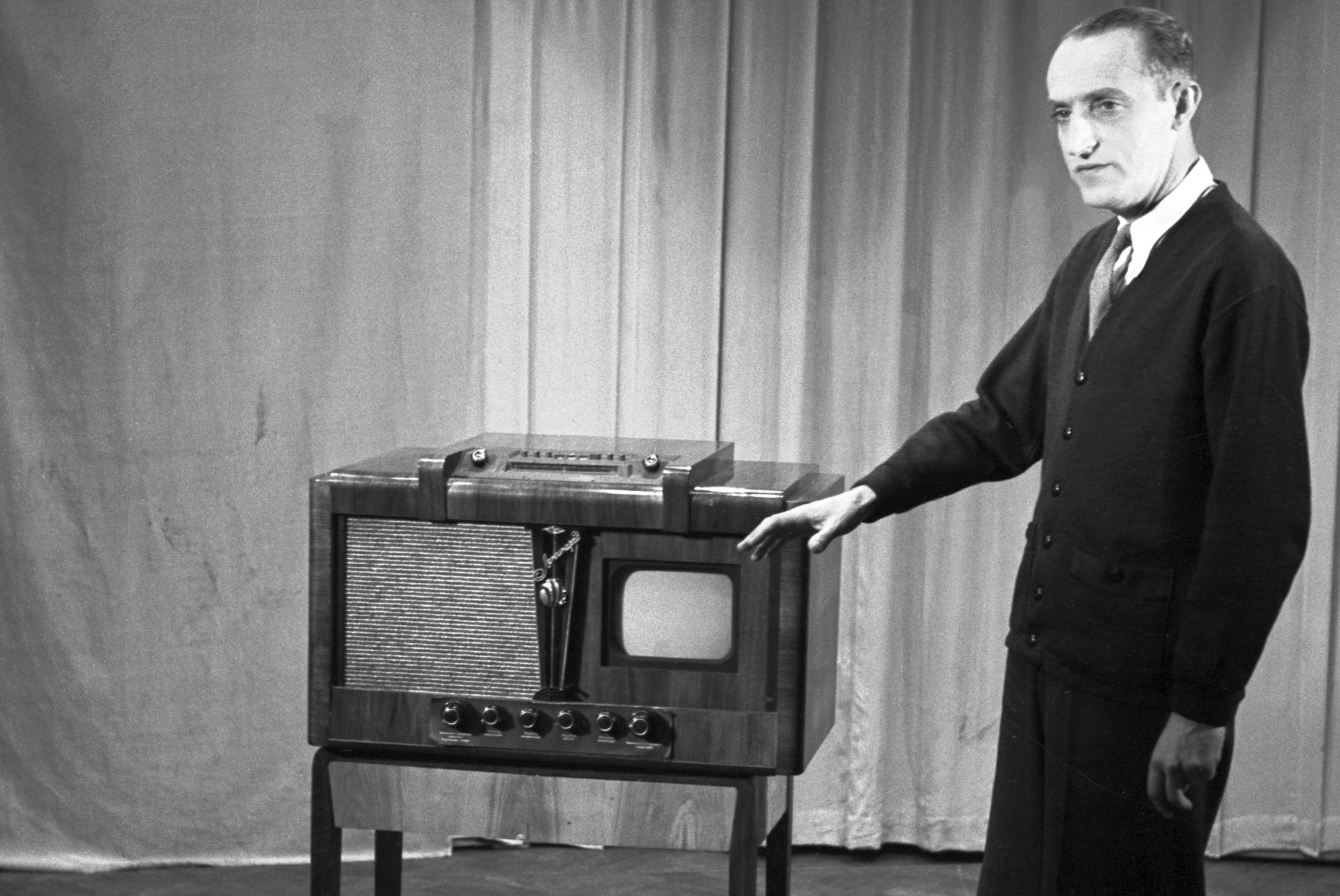
Kazimierz Rudzki presents a "Leningrad" brand television receiver

Work on Polish Television was resumed in 1947. Work at the National Telecommunications Institute (later the Institute of Telecommunications) was carried out under the supervision of Janusz Groszkowski and Lesław Kędzierski. On 15 December 1951, the exhibition "Radio in the fight for peace and progress" was opened, during which trial television broadcasts with the participation of artists were shown, the daily broadcast of the television programme lasted until 20 January 1952. In 1952 a studio was established at the Ratuszowa 11 street in Warsaw, and the first television programme team was established. The first programme was broadcast on 25 October 1952 at 7:00 p.m. (on the eve of the Sejm elections). Then, a 30-minute montage of artistic forms with the participation of Marta Nowosad, Jerzy Michotek, Witold Gruca and Jan Mroziński was broadcast from the Institute of Telecommunications, which was received on 24 Leningrad receivers located in clubs and community centres. The first announcer was Maria Rosa-Krzyżanowska. Subsequent broadcasts took place on 15 November 1952 (excerpts of Lalka with Nina Andrycz in the main role were shown) and 5 December 1952 (excerpts of The King and the Actor from the Chamber Theatre in Warsaw).

Three months later, on 23 January 1953, a regular broadcast of the Polish television programme was initiated (half an hour once a week). On 22 July 1954, the Experimental Television centre was launched with its own journalistic team. The programme was broadcast from the former bank building at Plac Powstańców Warszawy 7, specially rebuilt and enlarged after war damage to meet the needs of the newly established institution. The centre's programme was initially broadcast once a week on Fridays, from 1 April 1955 - twice (on Tuesdays and Fridays), from 1 November 1955 - three days a week (on Mondays, Wednesdays and Fridays), and from 1 January 1956 - four days a week (additionally on Sundays). Exceptionally, daily broadcasts took place during the broadcast of the Peace Races and the 5th World Festival of Youth and Students in 1955.

On 30 April 1956, the Warsaw Television centre (Warszawski Ośrodek Telewizyjny) was opened, which provided access to TV programmes to a larger group of viewers. WOT broadcast five days a week. On 1 May 1956, the Television Transmission centre began operation with a transmitting station located in the Palace of Culture and Science and an antenna on the top of the spire at a height of 227 m. The station's range was approximately 55 km.

=== One-channel period ===
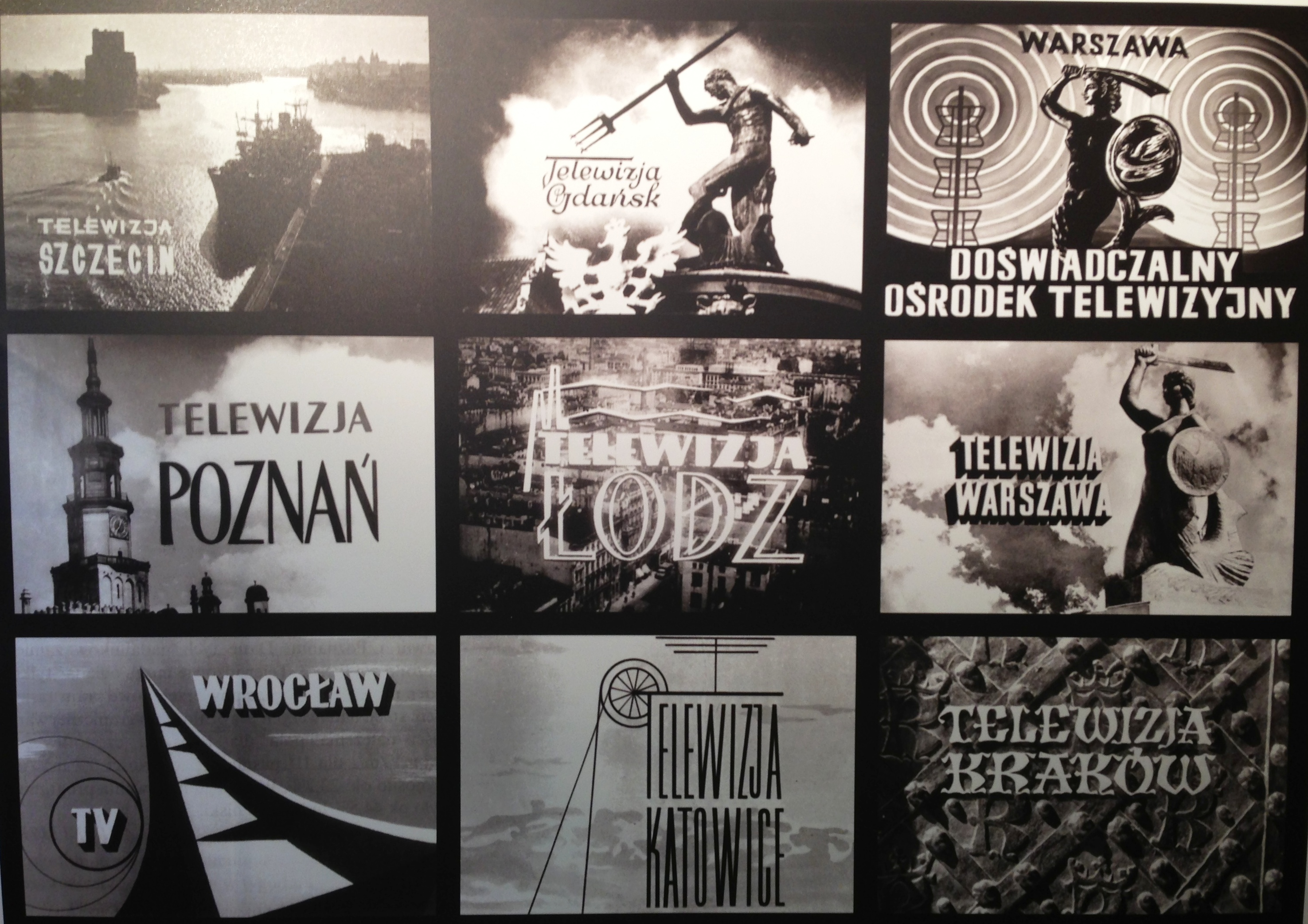
Station identification boards (idents) of each city, 1950s and 1960s

The real beginning of Polish Television was the creation of the Television programme Team at the Polish Radio on 1 August 1958. Two years later (2 December 1960), the "Polish Radio and Television" Committee was established. From then on, Polish Radio and TVP had equal status. The first head of the Radio Committee (a position equivalent to a minister) was Włodzimierz Sokorski (the heads of the radio and television departments had the rank of deputy ministers). On 1 February 1961, the daily broadcast of the television programme began. At the turn of the 1950s and 1960s, seven TVP regional centres were established (with their own studios) in:

- Łódź (22 July 1956) – TVP3 Łódź
- Poznań (1 May 1957) – TVP3 Poznań
- Katowice (3 December 1957) – TVP3 Katowice
- Wrocław (14 December 1962) – TVP3 Wrocław
- Gdańsk (10 August 1959) – TVP3 Gdańsk
- Szczecin (27 April 1960) – TVP3 Szczecin
- Kraków (5 June 1961) – TVP3 Kraków

On 18 July 1969, the Radio and Television centre in Warsaw was opened at Woronicza Street. Large financial outlays were incurred to create it, and the technicians also managed to assemble high-class television equipment.

=== Two-channel period ===
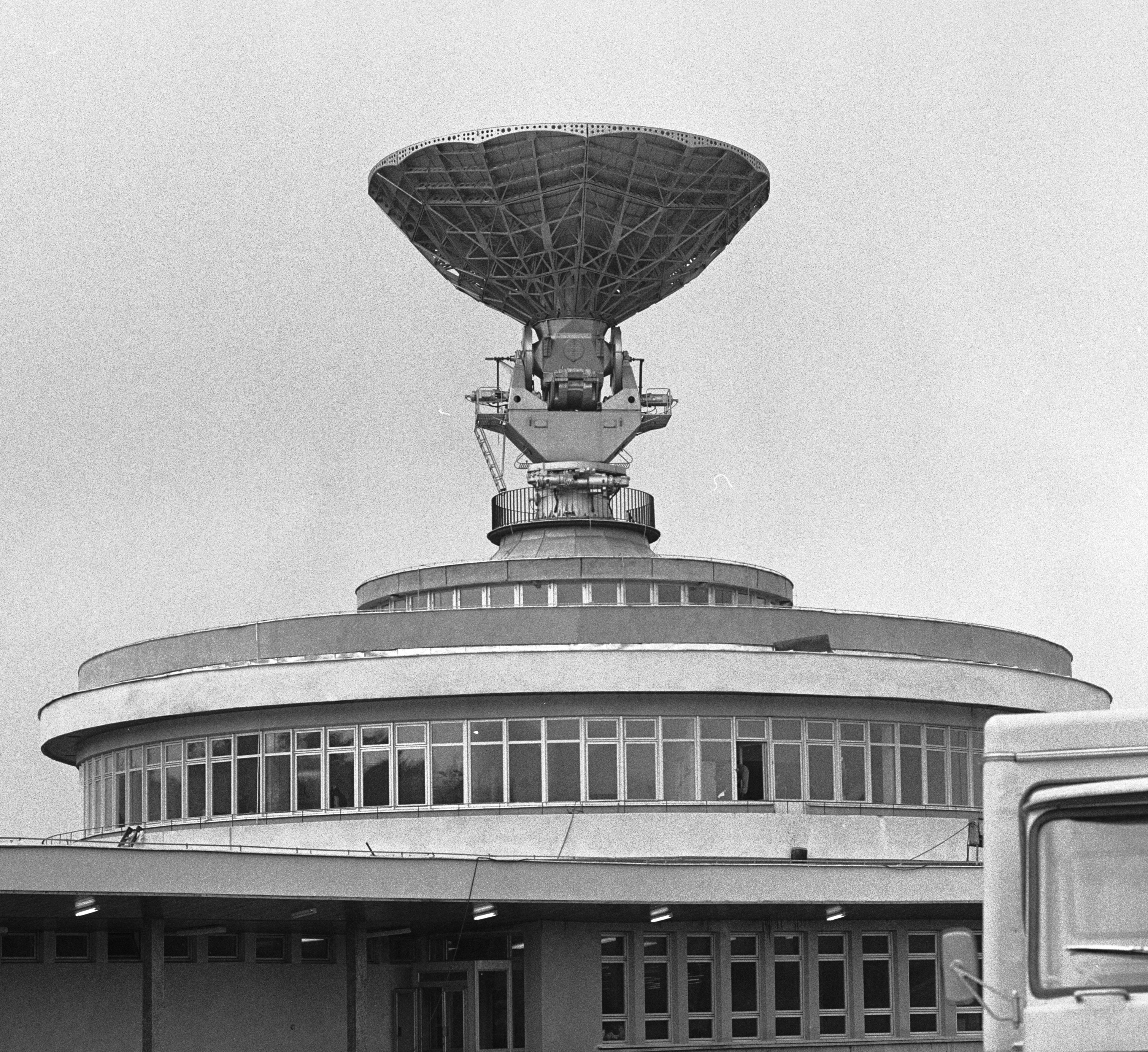
The first ground satellite communication station in Poland

On 2 October 1970, the second national television network was officially launched. From the beginning of its existence, TVP2 focused mainly on cultural and entertainment programmes (including Studio 2).

The opening of Poland to the West - characteristic of Gierek's era - allowed Polish television to have access to modern technologies from the free world. The first result of the cooperation was the broadcasting of the first colour programme on 22 July 1971, using the French SECAM system - it was an adaptation of Anton Chekhov's monodrama On the Harm of Tobacco Smoking. Over time, it was the standard adopted in all countries (except Romania) of the Eastern Bloc. Initially, the programme was broadcast in colour once a week, from December 6, 1971, the proceedings of the PZPR congress were broadcast every day in colour (the first cyclical colour broadcasts in Europe were broadcast in 1967), but due to the lack of receivers and their high cost, colour television was not available to most Polish television viewers at that time.

In 1972, after Maciej Szczepański took over the position of president of TVP, approximately 12,000 people lost their jobs at the corporation.

On 1 November 1975, the first terrestrial satellite communication station in Poland was put into operation in Psary-Kąty (Świętokrzyskie Mountains), which significantly expanded TVP's broadcasting capabilities.

After a long break in the creation of new television centres, on 12 January 1985, a local television branch in Lublin was established, TVP3 Lublin. On 1 January 1989, Telegazeta was established, the first teletext service in Poland.

=== Democracy ===
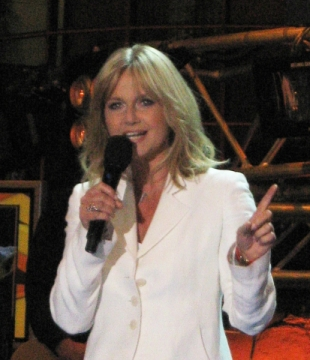
Grażyna Torbicka, longtime TVP presenter

The socio-political changes at the turn of the 1980s and 1990s also resulted in television reform. In 1987, TVP lost its monopoly on broadcasting television in Poland, when the first private Polish television station, "Ursynat", was established in the Ursynów district of Warsaw. In 1989, another station, Sky Orunia, was established, broadcasting in Gdańsk until 1996, and on 6 February 1990, PTV Echo was established, broadcasting in Wrocław and the surrounding area until 8 March 1995, and then on 5 December 1992 Polsat started broadcasting, which on 5 October 1993 received a licence for terrestrial broadcasting in Poland from the National Broadcasting Council and on 27 January 1994 a license for nationwide commercial television. In the early 1990s, it was decided to completely switch from the SECAM system to the PAL system, in which the two national TVP networks adopted it (later TVP Polonia and TVP the regional stations also switched to this system). On 1 January 1993, together with Polish Radio, TVP became a member of the European Broadcasting Union (EBU). At the same time, since the 1990s, many TVP presenters and journalists began to leave public television, moving to commercial television (including Polsat and TVN).

After 1989, TVP news programmes were accused of being subject to political influence depending on who was in power in Poland, as well as being biased and lacking objectivity. In 1997, the first theme channel of public television was launched - Tylko Muzyka, but it ended broadcasting a year later due to formal and legal reasons. In 1998, the official website of Telewizja Polska was created - www.tvp.pl. In 2004, the first edition of the New Year's Eve musical show organised by TVP took place under the name Sylwester z Gwiazdami (New Year's Eve With the Stars). On 24 April 2005, another theme channel - TVP Kultura - started broadcasting. In the following years, Telewizja Polska launched further theme channels (18 November 2006 - TVP Sport; 3 May 2007 - TVP Historia; 6 October 2007 - TVP Info; which replaced TVP3; December 6, 2010 - TVP Seriale; 15 April 2013 - TVP Rozrywka; 1 September 2013 – TVP Regionalna; 15 February 2014 – TVP ABC).

TVP investigated an unidentified television channel in December 2005, which was named TVP Erotyka on satellite decoders, and was not part of the corporation.

In 2008, Telewizja Polska started broadcasting in HD quality, and on 6 August of the same year, TVP HD started broadcasting. On 16 June 2011, the first online theme channel was launched - TVP Parliament . On 1 June 2012, two nationwide networks, TVP1 and TVP2, started broadcasting in HD quality. Polish Television was working on introducing 3D images to its channels. As part of digital terrestrial television and the offers of selected cable and satellite operators, it enables the use of hybrid television using the TVP Hybrid Platform. There were already plans to launch further channels, TVP Nauka, TVP 4K and TVP Muzyka. Since 1993, the legal status of the broadcaster has been defined by the Broadcasting Act, according to which Telewizja Polska is obliged to implement "a public mission ... by offering ... various programmes and other services in the field of information, journalism, culture, entertainment, education and sport, characterised by pluralism, impartiality, balance and independence as well as innovation, high quality and integrity of the message."

In 2018, Telewizja Polska started broadcasting, as one of the three largest television stations, in 4K quality under the name TVP 4K. On 17 September 2019, the TVP Wilno channel intended for Poles living in Lithuania began broadcasting. In March 2020, the decision to close educational institutions due to the COVID-19 pandemic, Telewizja Polska initiated the "Szkoła z TVP" project in cooperation with the Ministry of National Education. On 19 November 2020, the TVP Dokument channel began broadcasting, on 8 March 2021 - TVP Kobieta, and in 2022 - TVP Nauka.

=== 2023 takeover ===
On 19 December 2023, the Sejm passed a resolution on "restoring the legal order and the impartiality and integrity of the public media and the Polish Press Agency" with 244 votes in favour. There were 84 votes against and 16 abstentions. The same day, Minister of Culture Bartłomiej Sienkiewicz dismissed the authorities of public media. The following day saw the termination of TVP Info, TVP 3, and TVP World's programming, with the associated broadcasts being instead switched to those of other TVP stations. News programming that would normally air on TVP 1 (Teleexpress, Wiadomości) and TVP 2 (Panorama) was instead replaced by standby sequences of the stations' respective logos.

On 21 December 2023, at 19:30, TVP broadcast its first evening news bulletin by the new team of journalists, under the title 19.30.

== International cooperation ==
In 2012, TVP signed an agreement with the BBC, under which they will work together on film and television productions.

The French-German TV liberal arts network ARTE cancelled a 15-year cooperation with TVP, when it learned in February 2009 that TVP's general director, Piotr Farfał, was a member of the League of Polish Families, which opposed Arte's "philosophy based on intercultural exchange" and "the party that TVP's chairman is presently connected with does not share European values". It was again cancelled in January 2016 after an amendment of the media law in Poland, which caused fears of a lack of pluralism and independence of TVP.

== Viewership ==
In September 2020, TVP's "Wiadomości" was the most popular news programme in Poland, with an average of 2.66 million viewers a day.
In February 2021, TVP's "Wiadomości" was second most popular news programme in Poland, with an average of 2.41 million viewers a day.

== Logo history ==
TVP's first logo used from 1952 to 1956

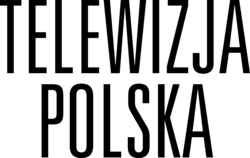
TVP's second logo used from 1956 to 1963

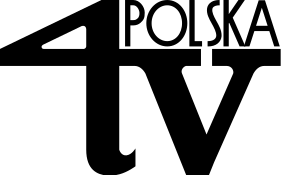
TVP's third logo used from 1963 to 1976

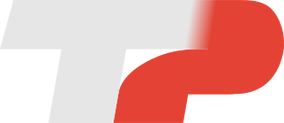
TVP's fourth logo used from 1976 to 1992.

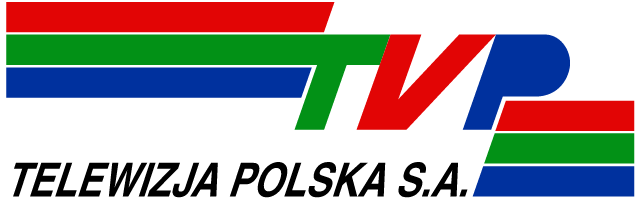
TVP's fifth logo used from 1992 to 2003.

TVP's sixth logo used from 2003

Another variant of TVP's sixth logo used from 2003

== TV channels ==
=== Television channels ===
- TVP1: mostly information, current affairs, reportages, movies, dramas, religious, sports, documentaries, theatres and game shows. Broadcasts 23.5 hours per day. Full HD introduced 1 June 2012.
- TVP2: mostly morning show, entertainments, movies, comedy, soap operas, series, stand-up comedy, culture, sports and game shows. Broadcasts 23.5 hours per day. Full HD introduced 1 June 2012.
- TVP3: region-focused channel, which airs local programmes (regional slots broadcasts 5 hours per day), and acts as the umbrella label for local stations including:
  - TVP3 Białystok in Białystok for Podlaskie region, Full HD introduced 19 December 2023;
  - TVP3 Bydgoszcz in Bydgoszcz-Toruń for the Kuyavian-Pomeranian region, Full HD introduced 15 December 2023;
  - TVP3 Gdańsk in Trójmiasto for the Pomerania region, Full HD introduced 15 December 2023;
  - TVP3 Gorzów Wielkopolski in Gorzów Wielkopolski for Lubusz region, Full HD introduced 15 December 2023;
  - TVP3 Katowice in Katowice (Metropolis GZM) for Silesian region, Full HD introduced 15 December 2023;
  - TVP3 Kielce in Kielce for Holy Cross region, Full HD introduced 19 December 2023;
  - TVP3 Kraków for the Lesser Poland region, Full HD introduced 19 December 2023;
  - TVP3 Lublin for the Lublin region, Full HD introduced 19 December 2023;
  - TVP3 Łódź for the Łódź region, Full HD introduced 15 December 2023;
  - TVP3 Olsztyn for Warmia-Masuria region, Full HD introduced 19 December 2023;
  - TVP3 Opole for the Opole region, Full HD introduced 15 December 2023;
  - TVP3 Poznań for the Greater Poland region, Full HD introduced 15 December 2023;
  - TVP3 Rzeszów for the Subcarpathian region, Full HD introduced 19 December 2023;
  - TVP3 Szczecin for the West Pomerania region, Full HD introduced 15 December 2023;
  - TVP3 Warszawa for Warsaw and the Masovia region, Full HD introduced 15 February 2022;
  - TVP3 Wrocław for the Lower Silesia region, Full HD introduced 15 December 2023.
- TVP Info: news channel. Full HD introduced 30 September 2016.
  - TVP Parlament: Internet-channel, broadcasts of parliamentary sessions and state events. Since February 2024 "TVP Parlament" brand is no longer used in streams, it was replaced by "TVP Info" brand. Available on own portal (tvpparlament.pl/transmisje), and two channels (Sejm and Senat) in streaming service TVP VOD.
- TVP Sport: sport channel. Full HD introduced 12 January 2014.
  - tvpsport.pl: Internet-channel, broadcasts of sporting events not included in the linear TV-channel schedule. Since June 2026 "tvpsport.pl" brand is no longer used in streams, it was replaced by "TVP Sport" brand. Available on own portal (sport.tvp.pl/transmisje), mobile or smart-TV apps and TVP VOD HbbTV app.
- TVP Kultura: high-brow culture channel. Broadcasts 23,5 hours per day. Full HD introduced 23 October 2019.
- TVP Kultura 2: high-brow culture channel. Broadcasts 22-23,5 hours per day (available in HbbTV in Poland and DVB-T in South-East Lithuania). Unofficially, there are plans to close this channel.
- TVP Historia: focusing on history. Broadcasts 23,5 hours per day. Full HD introduced 27 February 2023. Unofficially reported plans to replace this channel with a new channel TVP Wiedza (merge channels TVP Historia, TVP Dokument and TVP Nauka).
- TVP Historia 2: focusing on history. Broadcasts 19,5-20 hours per day (available in HbbTV in Poland and DVB-T in Lithuania and South-East Lithuania). Unofficially, there are plans to close this channel.
- TVP Dokument: documentary movies channel. Broadcasts 23,5 hours per day. Start broadcast in Full HD from 19 November 2020. Unofficially, there are plans to close this channel.
- TVP Nauka: focusing on science and nature. Broadcasts 23,5 hours per day. Start broadcast in Full HD from 3 October 2022. Unofficially, there are plans to close this channel.
- TVP ABC: Children's channel. Broadcasts 19 hours per day. Full HD introduced 28 March 2022.
- Alfa TVP: teenager's channel broadcasts 18 hours per day. Start broadcast in Full HD from 20 December 2022. Unofficially, there are plans to close this channel.
- TVP ABC 2: pre-school channel broadcasts 18,5 hours per day (available in HbbTV). Unofficially, there are plans to close this channel.
- TVP Seriale: focusing on series. Broadcasts 23,5 hours per day. Full HD introduced 27 February 2023. Pay channel (available in pay package TVP VOD+). Unofficially announced plans to transfer these channels to free-to-air broadcasting.
- TVP Kobieta: focusing on programmes aimed at women. Broadcasts 22,5-23,5 hours per day. Start broadcast in Full HD from 8 March 2021. Unofficially, there are plans to close this channel.
- TVP Rozrywka: focusing on entertainment. Broadcasts 23,5 hours per day. Full HD introduced 23 February 2022.
- TVP HD: the best productions of TVP. Broadcasts 23,5 hours per day. Start broadcast in Full HD from 6 August 2008. Pay channel (available in pay package TVP VOD+). Unofficially announced plans to transfer these channels to free-to-air broadcasting.
- TVP 4K: Ultra HD channel from TVP. In the past was a sport broadcasting channel in 2018, 2021 and 2022. But unofficially, the launch of a full-fledged (multithematic) channel is possible no earlier than 2025. Currently this channel is a "frozen project".

=== International channels ===
- TVP World – English-language channel with a focus on news from the CEE region for international audience. The broadcast schedule include 15-minutes news bulletin in German (premiere episode at weekdays 19:30 CET, with replay at 4:40 CET). 4 July 2024 new structure "TVP International Media Centre" (TVP IMC, TVP "Ośrodek Mediów dla Zagranicy") was created based on TVP World. Available on DTT in HbbTV (United Kingdom and Poland), HEVC DVB-T2 (Poland and Vienna) and DVB-T (Estonia and Lithuania). Start broadcast in Full HD from 18 November 2021.
- TVP Polonia – Polish-language channel presenting programm "Polonia 24. Tygodnik" for the Polish diaspora (the so-called Polonia) in worldwide and selected TVP programs and live events. From 1 December 2025 this channel is a part of "TVP International Media Centre". In 2026, due to financial constraints, was closed programs about life of Polish diaspora in favor of the program "Polonia 24. Tygodnik" with extended timing from 30 to 60 minutes. Available on DTT in Lithuania (DVB-T) and Poland (HEVC DVB-T2). Full HD introduced 1 September 2020.
- Belsat – channel in the Belarusian language presenting news, subject-specific and multithematic programmes for the people in Belarus. From 4 July 2024 this channel is a part of "TVP International Media Centre". From 3 March 2025 Belsat linear schedule include to multi-hour slots from Slava (8 hours a day) and Vot Tak/VT (7 hours a day). Available on DTT in Lithuania (DVB-T) and Poland (HEVC DVB-T2). Full HD introduced on 17 February 2022.
  - Slawa - television and multimedia platform with priority on audience in Ukraine. Redaction was begun work on 3 February 2025. As a separate channel, it started broadcasting on 3 March 2025. First, as a multi-hour slot on Belsat linear broadcasting schedule, with the perspective of transferring to a separate linear channel. There is currently no information about when Slava will launch a separate linear channel and when Slava will leave Belsat linear broadcast after the launch of a separate linear channel.
  - Vot Tak - television and multimedia platform for Russian-language audience, with priority on audience in Russia. Start broadcast from 5 June 2017 (first as a television news program). On 3 December 2024 "Vot Tak" became a separate Russian-language redaction, a part of the "TVP International Media Centre". As a separate channel, start broadcast from 3 March 2025. First, as a multi-hour slot on Belsat linear broadcasting schedule, with the perspective of transferring to a separate linear channel. On the end of March 2026 Vot Tak added own second name VT in connection with the launch of news services in other languages (Romanian for Moldova (from 2 February 2026), Armenian (from 30 March 2026), Georgian (from 27 April 2026), Kazakh (from 31 August 2026). Also on Russian for Moldova (from 5 September 2025) and Kazakhstan (from 31 August 2026)) There is currently no information about when Vot Tak will launch a separate linear channel and when Vot Tak will leave Belsat linear broadcast after the launch of a separate linear channel.
- TVP Wilno – channel presenting news and programmeming for the Polish-speaking minority in the Vilnius region of Lithuania, available in DVB-T in this country. Broadcasts 22–23 hours per day. Full HD introduced 10 September 2021. From 3 March 2026 this channel is a part of "TVP International Media Centre".

=== Streaming ===
- TVP VOD: the main streaming service with linear TV-channels (all TVP channels, Belsat and streams from TVP Parlament (Sejm and Senat)), content library and premium content for paid subscribers (pay packages TVP VOD+, Strefa ABO and Filmy na życzenie). After the restart in October 2022, premieres produced specifically for this service began to appear. The list of linear TV-channels disappeared after the restart, but return to service on 1 June 2023. Available on own portal (vod.tvp.pl) and any apps and devices.

=== TVP VOD FAST-channels ===
- TVP Na dobre i na złe
- TVP Barwy szczęścia
- TVP Klan
- TVP Kryminały
- TVP Miłość
- TVP Muzyka I Koncerty

=== Proposed channels ===
- TVP Wiedza
- TVP Festiwale

=== Former channels, services and projects ===
- TVP Regionalna (1994–2000): Regional network (first version).
- TVP3 (2000–2007): Regional network (first version).
- TVP Info (2007–2013): News channel and Regional network.
- TVP Regionalna (2013–2016): Regional network (relauch, second version). Replaced by TVP3 (second version).
- Poland IN (2018–2021): English-language online platform. Replaced by TVP World.
- TVP eSzkoła (2020–2022): educational channel during the pandemic.
- TVP eSzkoła Domowe Przedszkole (2020–2022): educational channel during the pandemic. Replaced by TVP ABC 2.
- Tylko Muzyka (1997–1998): First thematic channel from TVP.
- TVP Żagle (2013)
- iTVP (2005–2008): interactive channel.
- TVP Telewizja Naziemna (2020–2021)
- TVP Bieszczady (2014)
- TVP 25 lat wolności (2014)
- TVP Festiwal Dwa Teatry Sopot 2014 (2014)
- TVP Regionalna śladami Jana Pawła 2 (2014)
- TVP Zdrowo i ze Smakiem (2014)
- TVP GO (2022-2026)
- TVP Stream (de facto closedown from 2025)

== Controversies ==
Before 2015, the PiS (then opposition) often criticised TVP of siding with government (PO–PSL) or even compared it to communist propaganda In 2015, the government passed a law allowing it to directly appoint the head of TVP. Since then, TVP has displayed bias towards the Law and Justice (PiS) party (then government), and was compared by critics with propaganda of the former Communist regime. TVP has also faced criticism for its portrayal of LGBT people, the political opposition, Jews, and other groups as a shadowy conspiracy seeking to undermine Poland. In 2018, The Economist stated: "the [TVP] anchors... praise PiS slavishly while branding its critics treacherous crypto-communists.

In July 2016 Politico Europe criticised it for strong pro-government bias.

In 2017, TVP triggered a hate campaign against Polsat journalist Dorota Bawolek, following a question the Bawolek asked to the European Commission in Brussels regarding a controversial judicial reform in Poland. The hate campaign resulted in death threats against the journalist. The European Commission expressed its condemnation of the online hate campaign caused by TVP and the Strasbourg-based Council of Europe issued an alert to the Polish authorities in respect of the hate campaign against Bawolek.

The press freedom organisation Reporters Without Borders wrote in its 2019 assessment of Polish press freedom that "many blamed state-owned TV broadcaster TVP's 'hate propaganda' for Gdansk mayor Paweł Adamowicz's murder in January 2019.". Ahead of the 2019 European parliament elections, TVP ran 105 segments of the election of which 68 of 69 focused on the ruling party were positive and all 33 about the opposition were negative, according to a study by the Society of Journalists. Polish political scientist and anti-racism activist Rafał Pankowski stated, "I am old enough to remember Communist-controlled television in the 1980s, and I can safely say that what we have now is cruder, more primitive, and more aggressive than anything that was broadcast at that time." This contrasts with the testimonies that killer of Paweł Adamowicz was reading Gazeta Wyborcza, Dziennik Bałtycki, Polityka and Wprost and watched TVN, and Polsat but not TVP

TVP was heavily criticised in the run-up to the 2020 Polish presidential election, being described as the "mouthpiece" of the government and as "peddl[ing] government hate speech" by the organisation Reporters Without Borders. The state television broadcast a segment of Wiadomości called Trzaskowski spełni żydowskie żądania? ("Will Trzaskowski meet Jewish demands?") regarding the Civic Platform candidate Rafał Trzaskowski. A complaint was made by the American Jewish Committee, Union of Jewish Religious Communities, the Chief Rabbi of Poland, to the Polish Media Ethics Council regarding antisemitism in the programme. The Council concluded not only were anti-semitic statements made in the show, it did not uphold journalistic standards: Wiadomości "turned into an instrument of propaganda of one of the candidates in this election".

In 2020, the station was ordered to retract a documentary, Inwazja, released just before the 2019 elections. Comparing the LGBT movement unfavourably to the Swedish Deluge and Communism, the documentary claimed that there is an "LGBT invasion" of Poland and that LGBT organisations have the goal of legalising pedophilia. It was found to defame the Campaign Against Homophobia organisation. Ombudsman Adam Bodnar stated, "The material not only reproduces stereotypes and heightens social hatred towards LGBT people, but also manipulates facts." Following the change of government in the 2023 Polish parliamentary election, a TVP host formally apologised to the LGBT community for attacks broadcast against them.

According to Timothy Garton Ash, "the broadcaster has descended into the paranoid world of the far right, where spotless, heroic, perpetually misunderstood Poles are being conspired against by dark, international German-Jewish-LGBT-plutocratic forces meeting secretly in Swiss chateaux." TVP president Jacek Kurski rejected the contention that the organisation violated broadcasting law, and conservative media commentator and former TVP employee Jacek Kurski says the station "deserves recognition" for its "consistent promotion of patriotism and pro-state thinking".

== See also ==
- Polskie Radio
- Radiokomitet
- National Broadcasting Council
