= TVP3 Szczecin =

- Logo used since from January 2016

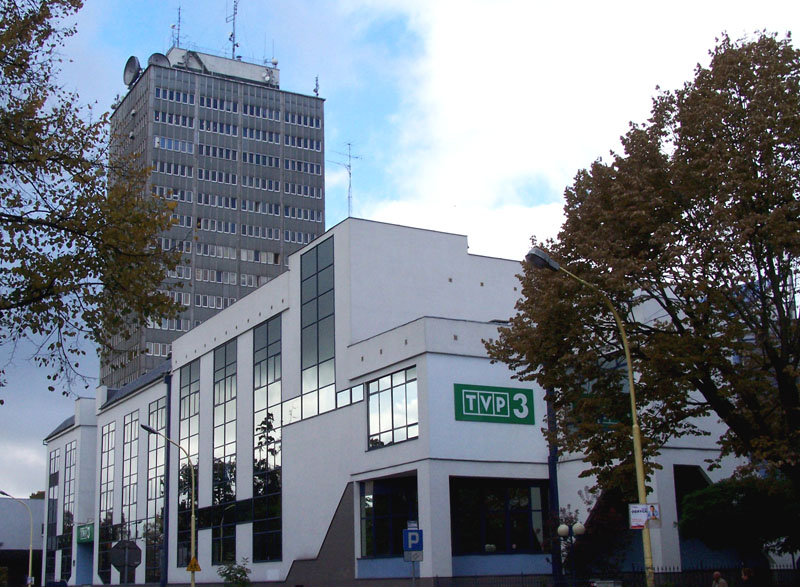
- Studio building

West Pomeranian Voivodeship; Poland
- City: Szczecin
- Channels: Digital: 48 (UHF); Virtual: 3

Programming
- Language: Polish
- Affiliations: TVP

Ownership
- Owner: Telewizja Polska

History
- First air date: 27 April 1960
- Former names: Telewizja Szczecin (1960–1995); Kanał 7 (1992–2000); TVP Szczecin (1995–2003; 2007–2016)

Links
- Website: https://szczecin.tvp.pl/

TVP3 Szczecin is one of the regional branches of the TVP, Poland's public television broadcaster. It is based in the city of Szczecin and serves the entire West Pomeranian Voivodeship.

Telewizja Szczecin was launched in 1960 after a four-year period of television experiments in the region, and in 1965 it was connected to the national TVP network, serving largely as its regional opt-out. In 1992, it relaunched as a standalone channel named Kanał 7, and shifted its focus to Latin American telenovelas and Western documentary programmes, in addition to its own productions. That same year, TVP created its own opt-out channel for the region named TV Szczecin. In 2002–03, TVP3 Szczecin was launched on the former Kanał 7 frequencies as part of the regional TVP3 network.

== Idents and interval signals ==
From 1960 until 1992, Telewizja Szczecin's ident was a static photo of a fragment of the Port of Szczecin taken from the Ewa Grain Elevator. The photo, converted to colour in 1983, was credited to photographer Witold Chromiński (1913–1977). Its interval signal, still in use in modified form as of 2025, consisted of a music theme created by composer Stanisław Modelski (1934–2015), by playing on two French horns with the agile humming of ship sirens.

== Programs ==
- Obiektyw Regionalna
- Wokół nas

== Programs nationwide ==
- Śmiechu warte (America's Funniest Home Videos) TVP1
