= Dorota Bawolek =

Polish journalist

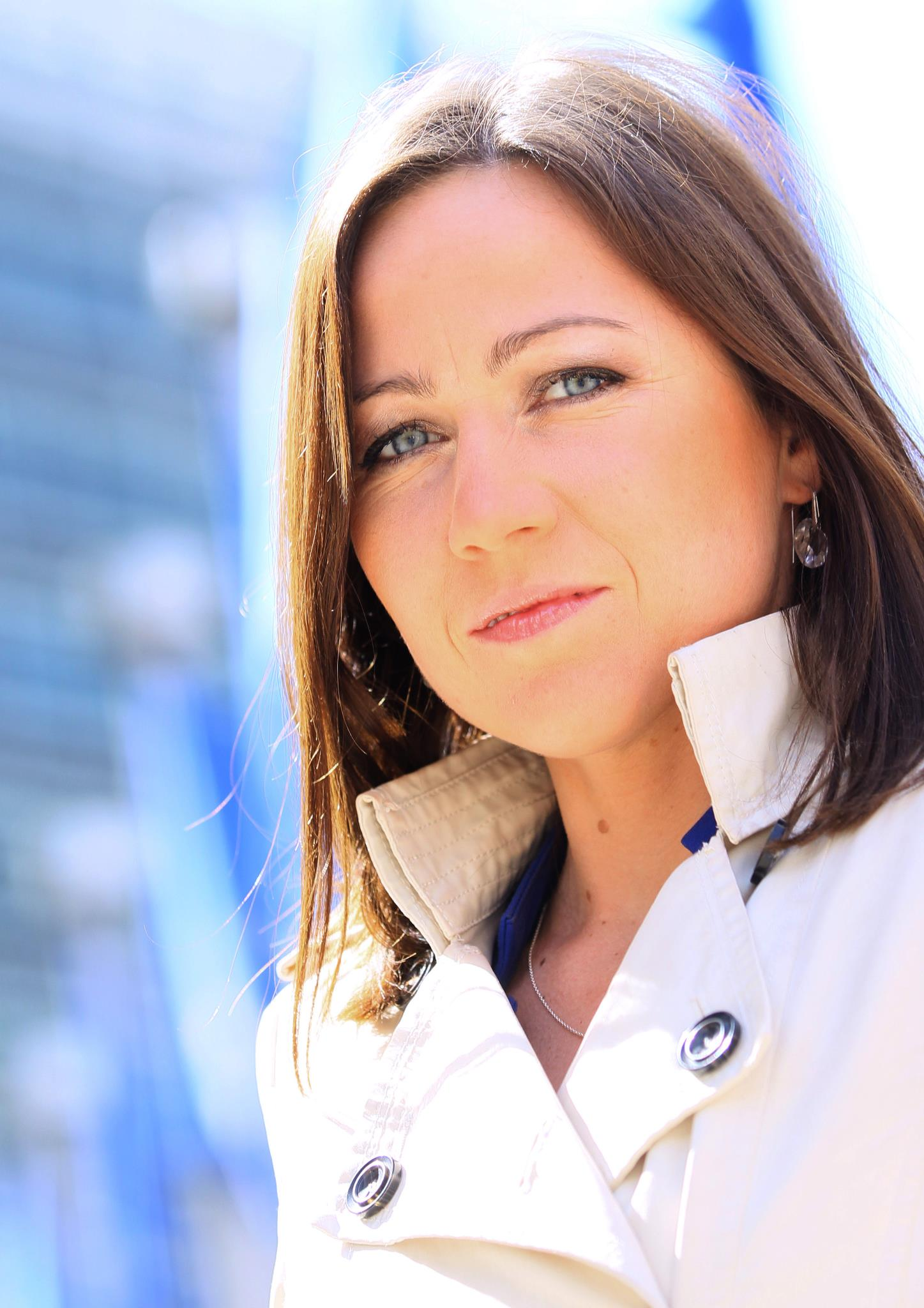
- Dorota Bawolek in 2013
- Born: 1982 (age 42–43); Poland
- Education: Birmingham City University
- Occupation(s): journalist, podcaster

Dorota Bawolek (also spelled Dorota Bawołek) is a Polish journalist. She is a former Brussels correspondent of Polish television channel Polsat.

== Career ==
Bawolek studied European integration in Poland. Following her studies, she completed an internship in Brussels. Bawolek was discouraged from entering politics when faced with the reality of the lengthy legislative process that she witnessed during her initial time in Brussels.

She subsequently studied broadcast journalism at Birmingham City University. She wrote for the BBC about Polish people living in the UK while living in London.

In 2008, Bawolek became the correspondent of Polsat in Brussels. Bawolek's time as correspondent for Polsat ended in 2023.

Under the Law and Justice (PiS) government rule in Poland, Bawolek has been subject to repeated hate and intimidation campaigns by the far right. The campaigns were instigated by Polish state media broadcaster TVP, who is considered to be controlled by the ruling party PiS.

In 2023, Bawolek launched her podcast, Stacja Bruksela.

== Controversy ==
=== 2017 ===
On 14 July 2017, the Polish national broadcaster TVP attacked Bawolek because of a question she asked at the press conference of the European Commission in Brussels on the previous day. Bawolek had insisted the European Commission spokesperson react to developments in Poland relating to a reform of the judicial system by the ruling party PiS. The reforms, widely seen as anti-democratic, did not initially receive any condemnation by the European Commission, leading Bawolek to use a provocative tone with the European Commission's spokesperson when asking her question. TVP reproached Bawolek for her questions, which the broadcaster described as "harmful for Poland".

The hate campaign against Bawolek was condemned within days by the European Commission's spokesperson as inacceptable.

On 18 July 2017, the Strasbourg-based Council of Europe published an alert in regard to alleged online threats made against Bawolek.

The Vice President of the European Commission, Frans Timmermans, defended Bawolek. She was, according to him, doing her job by asking questions in the press room of the European Commission. Other top politicians at the European Commission that expressed support for Bawolek included the Vice president of the European Commission, Vera Jourova.

=== 2022 ===
In October 2022, Bawolek agreed to an exclusive interview with the leader of Polish opposition party Civic Platform, Donald Tusk. The live interview was to take place directly after a summit of the European People's Party in Brussels, as Tusk and other political leaders left the meeting. A Polish journalist from TVP tried to interfere with Bawolek's interview of Tusk and recorded Bawolek objecting to their presence, all without disclosing their identity. The recording was subsequently aired on TVP in an edited format, with commentary accusing Bawolek of preventing TVP from access to Tusk. The broadcast triggered an online hate campaign against Bawolek, including violent messages posted on her social media.

The Brussels-based International Press Association (API) expressed their support to Bawolek. The API's message was echoed by the European Commissioner for Justice Didier Reynders, who expressed his full support for Bawolek and condemned the smear campaign she faced.
