= TVP3 Warszawa =

DVB-T2 station
- Logo used since from January 2016

Masovian Voivodeship; Poland
- City: Warsaw
- Channels: Digital: 27 (UHF); Virtual: 3

Programming
- Language: Polish
- Affiliations: Telewizja Polska

Ownership
- Owner: Telewizja Polska

History
- First air date: 9 November 1958
- Former names: Warszawski Ośrodek Telewizyjny; Kanał 51; TVP Warszawa
- Former channel number: Analog: 51 (UHF)

Technical information
- Translator(s): UHF 31 (Chruszczewka Włościańska, Łosice and Siedlce); UHF 39 (Płock, Radziwie and Rachocin); UHF 42 (Ciechanów, Jastrzębiec, Ławy, Ostrołęka, Ostrów Mazowiecka, Podborze and Różan)

Links
- Website: https://warszawa.tvp.pl/

TVP3 Warszawa (TVP3 Warsaw) is one of the regional branches of the TVP, Poland's public television broadcaster. It serves the entire Masovian Voivodeship with particular dedication to the Warsaw metropolitan area. From 1992 till 2003 it was branded WOT (Warszawski Ośrodek Telewizyjny, Warsaw Television Centre), then till 2007 TVP3 Warszawa and since October 2007 it has been using its current name.

Since the reorganisation of TVP's regional broadcasting in 2013, TVP3 Warszawa has been part of TVP Regionalna, a network of TVP's 16 regional branches. It has its own digital, free-to-air channel branded TVP3 Warszawa, but it produces only several hours of programming a day and the rest of the schedule is filled with network programming.

The main studios are located at the TVP news compound in central Warsaw and local bureaus are in Płock, Radom and Siedlce.

== Programs ==
Some of the best known TVP Warszawa's programmes include:

- Telewizyjny Kurier Warszawski (Warsaw Television Chronicle) - local news from the Warsaw area (the oldest news program in Poland)
- Telewizyjny Kronika Mazowiecki (Mazovia Television Chronicle) - regional news from the voivodeship
- Kronika Warszawy i Mazowsza (Warsaw & Masovia Chronicle) - combined news from Warsaw and the voivodeship
- Raport na gorąco (Hot Report or translating less literally First Hand Report) - news from traffic accidents etc. gathered by reporters on motorbikes
- Wywiad Kronika (The Chronicle's Interview) - local interview show, often with local political topics
- Ratownicy (The Rescuers) - reports from the work of Warsaw's emergency services
