= TVP3 Gorzów Wielkopolski =

DVB-T2 station
- Logo used since from January 2016
- Lubusz Voivodeship; Poland
- City: Gorzów Wielkopolski
- Channels: Digital: 32 (UHF); Virtual: 3

Programming
- Language: Polish
- Affiliations: Telewizja Polska

Ownership
- Owner: Telewizja Polska

History
- Founded: Split from TVP3 Poznań
- First air date: 1 January 2005
- Former channel number: Analog: 49 (UHF)

Links
- Website: https://gorzow.tvp.pl/

TVP3 Gorzów Wielkopolski is one of the regional branches of the TVP, Poland's public television broadcaster. It serves the entire Lubusz Voivodeship.
