= Polish Radio Kielce =

Polskie Radio Kielce
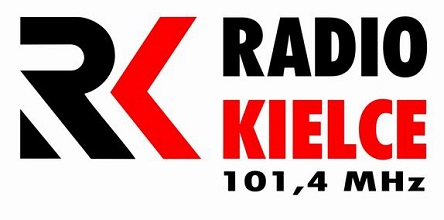

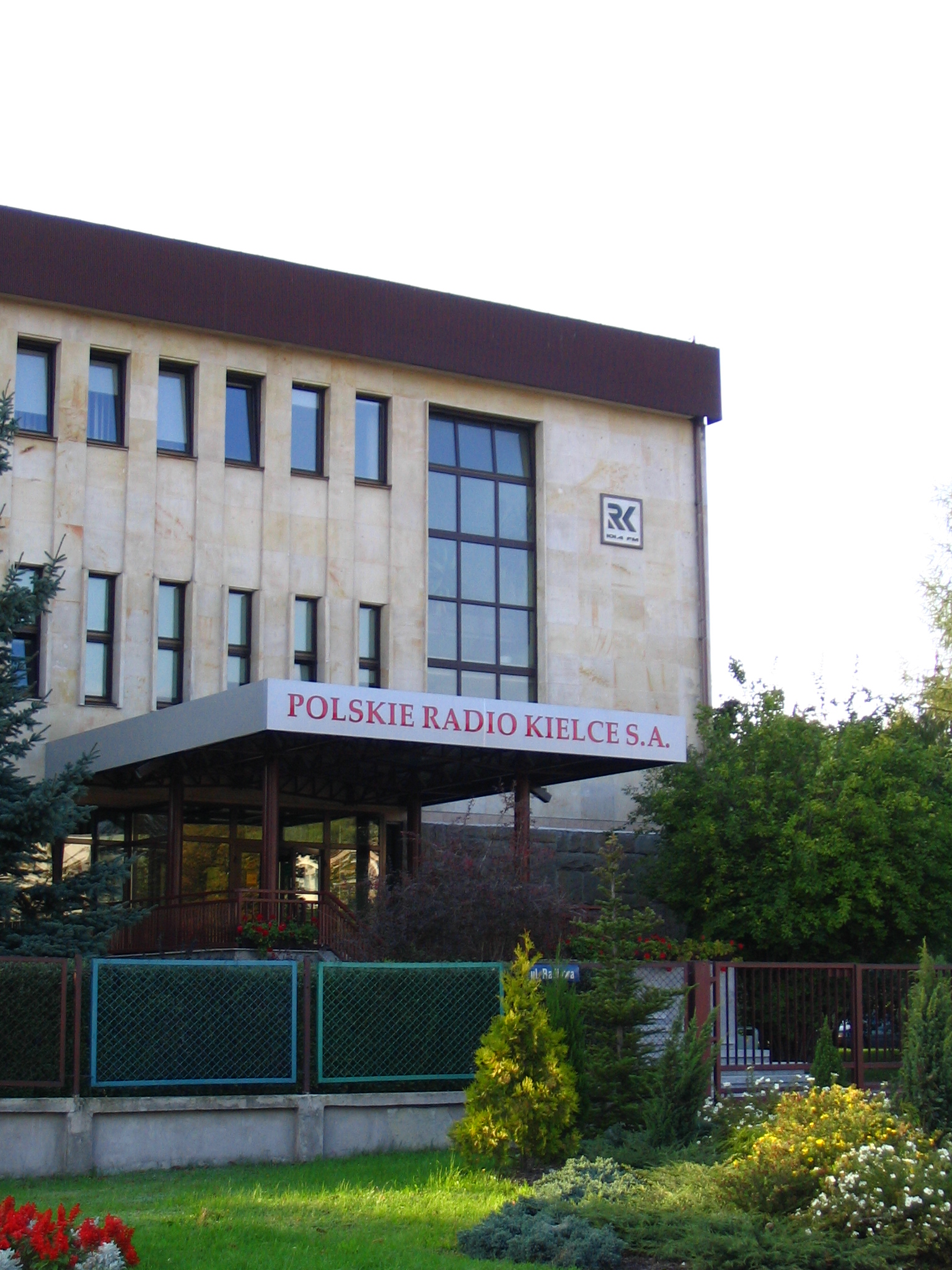
- Headquarters of Radio Kielce
- Kielce, Poland; Poland
- Broadcast area: Świętokrzyskie Voivodeship
- Branding: Radio Kielce

Programming
- Language: Polish
- Format: Regional, News, Music, Easy listening

Ownership
- Owner: Polskie Radio
- Sister stations: Regional Polish Radio

History
- First air date: 1952

Links
- Webcast: http://www.radiokielce.pl/player/
- Website: http://www.radiokielce.pl/

Polish Radio Kielce (Polskie Radio Kielce) - is the regional broadcaster based in Kielce. Radio Kielce is a part of public radio in Poland Polish Radio. It can be received in the Świętokrzyskie Voivodeship and partly in neighboring voivodeships.

== History ==
Radio Kielce has started in 1952.

== Broadcast Frequencies ==
| System transmitters | Location of transmitters | Frequency | Power ERP | Coverage of signal |
|---|---|---|---|---|
| DAB+ | Kielce SLR Targowa | 215.072 MHz, Channel 10D | 1,20 kW | City of Kielce |
| DAB+ | Święty Krzyż TV Tower | 215.072 MHz, Channel 10D | 10 kW | Świętokrzyskie Voivodeship |
| FM | Kielce SLR Targowa | 90.40 MHz | 0,25 kW | City of Kielce |
| FM | Dobromierz Transmitter | 100.00 MHz | 1 kW | Włoszczowa County |
| FM | Święty Krzyż TV Tower | 101.40 MHz | 120 kW | Świętokrzyskie Voivodeship |
