= TVP3 Olsztyn =

- Logo used since from January 2016
- Country: Poland

Programming
- Picture format: 16:9

Ownership
- Owner: Telewizja Polska

History
- Launched: January 1, 2005 -split from TVP3 Gdańsk

Links
- Website: www.tvp.pl/olsztyn

TVP3 Olsztyn is one of the regional branches of the TVP, Poland's public television broadcaster. It serves the entire Warmian-Masurian Voivodeship.
