= TVP Erotyka =

- Country: Poland

Programming
- Picture format: 4:3 SDTV

Ownership
- Owner: Stellar

History
- Launched: 2005
- Closed: 2006

TVP Erotyka was a Polish adult television channel operational between 2005 and 2006, operated by Stellar. Despite the name, the channel had no connection with Telewizja Polska. Until December 2005, it was known as Tęsknota TV; the channel broadcast erotic advertising.

== History ==
The channel was discovered by the editorial team of SAT Kurier, a Polish satellite publication and website, on 13 December 2005. The channel was labelled by the publication as a "new-old channel", due to its rename from the former Tęsknota TV. The channel was available free-to-air on both Hot Bird and Atlantic Bird satellites, using a transponder leased by RRSat. The channel had no on-screen bug, but appeared under the TVP Erotyka name on satellite receivers.

The following day, the channel was reported on Gazeta Wyborcza's website. The newspaper entered in contact with RRSat, who said that it was not involved in the broadcast of the channel, and to TVP, saying that the channel was not theirs and provided more information on the subject: TVP Erotyka was actually operated by Stellar, a German company (from Cologne), but its boss, Steffen Christ, was uncontactable. TVP was investigating the issue.

Around 17 December, the channel changed its name to TV PL Erotyka. The channel ceased transmissions with the new name on 30 March 2006.
