= TVP3 Lublin =

Regional public television broadcaster

TVP Lublin
- Logo used since from January 2016
- Country: Poland

Programming
- Picture format: 16:9

Ownership
- Owner: Telewizja Polska

History
- Launched: January 12, 1985
- Replaced by: TVP info

Links
- Website: www.tvp.pl/lublin

Availability

Terrestrial
- 14:30
- Polish Digital: MUX 3

TVP3 Lublin is one of the regional branches of the TVP, Poland's public television broadcaster. It serves the entire Lublin Voivodeship.
