= TVP3 Opole =

- Logo used since from January 2016
- Country: Poland

Programming
- Picture format: 16:9

Ownership
- Owner: Telewizja Polska

History
- Launched: 1 January 2005 -split from TVP3 Katowice

Links
- Website: www.tvp.pl/opole

Availability

Terrestrial
- Polish Digital: MUX 3

TVP3 Opole is one of the regional branches of the TVP, Poland's public television broadcaster. It serves the entire Opole Voivodeship.
