= TVP3 Białystok =

- Logo used since from January 2016
- Country: Poland

Programming
- Picture format: 16:9

Ownership
- Owner: Telewizja Polska

History
- Launched: December 21, 1997

Links
- Website: www.tvp.pl/bialystok

TVP3 Białystok is one of the regional branches of TVP, Poland's public television broadcaster. It serves the entire Podlaskie Voivodeship in northeastern Poland.

== History ==
In July 1996, a decision was taken by Telewizja Polska to create a regional station for Białystok. It joined the eleven existing regional stations, but at the time had no license and didn't air its own programming. On 1 September, Kazimierz Puciłowski was appointed as its first director, a position held until 31 August 1999.

The first television studio was built in January 1997. Initially it was located at St. Rocha Street, but that month alone, renovation work started for its current facilities at Włókiennicza Street, 16A, where its permanent facilities were going to be located. The facilities were in a former cash and carry; adapted for a television station. On 1 February 1997, Wojciech Worotyński was appointed vice-director of programming (until 31 December 1998). The first edition of Obiektyw, the local news service, aired on TVP2 on its slot for local programming on 16 February 1997.
