= TVP3 Rzeszów =

- Logo used since from January 2016
- Country: Poland

Programming
- Picture format: 16:9

Ownership
- Owner: Telewizja Polska

History
- Launched: October 19, 1990

Links
- Website: www.tvp.pl/rzeszow

TVP3 Rzeszów is one of the regional branches of the TVP, Poland's public television broadcaster. It serves the entire Podkarpackie Voivodeship.
