= TVP3 Wrocław =

TVP3 Wrocław (TVP Wrocław)
DVB-T2 station
- Logo used since from January 2016

Lower Silesian Voivodeship; Poland
- City: Wrocław
- Channels: Digital: 25 (UHF); Virtual: 3 (DTT)
- Branding: 2022-

Programming
- Language: Polish
- Affiliations: Telewizja Polska

Ownership
- Owner: Telewizja Polska

History
- First air date: 14 December 1962
- Former channel number: Analog: 42 (1992–2013)

Technical information
- Translator(s): 24 UHF (Głogów, Jakubów, Jelenia Góra, Legnica, Lubań, Nowa Karczma and Śnieżne Kotły)

Links
- Website: https://wroclaw.tvp.pl/

TVP3 Wrocław is one of the regional branches of the TVP, Poland's public television broadcaster. It serves the entire Lower Silesian Voivodeship.
