= TVP Wilno =

Polish-language channel in Lithuania

- Logo used since September 2019
- Country: Poland; Lithuania
- Broadcast area: Lithuania; Poland; United States

Programming
- Language: Polish
- Picture format: 16:9 (1080i, HDTV)

Ownership
- Owner: TVP International Media Centre
- Sister channels: TVP Polonia

History
- Launched: 17 September 2019; 7 years ago

Links
- Website: wilno.tvp.pl

Availability

Terrestrial
- Telecentras: MUX LRTC2 and local MUX in South-East Lithuania (DVB-T)

TVP Wilno is a Polish-language channel of Telewizja Polska catering to Poles living in Lithuania and Lithuanians interested in Poland. The official launch of the channel took place on 17 September 2019. The channel's offer can be watched throughout Lithuania and on the internet. Wilno is the Polish name of Vilnius.

The Polish Ministry of Foreign Affairs finances the channel's activities. The station also cooperates with other Polish local media: Radio "Znad Wilii", Wilnoteka, and Kurier Wileński.

From 3 March 2026, this channel is a part of the TVP International Media Centre (TVP IMC, TVP "Ośrodek Mediów dla Zagranicy").

== Mission ==
Its tasks include providing information and education among Poles in Lithuania, as well as:

- strengthening friendly relations between the Republic of Poland and the Republic of Lithuania,
- cultivating the Polish language and promoting Polish culture,
- integrating and activating the local community,
- presenting the Polish point of view on events in Lithuania, Poland, and the world,
- documenting the history and life of contemporary Poles living in the Vilnius region.
- acting as a counterweight in the information sphere to the efforts of the Russian media, which have been trying to maintain their *influence in the Baltic countries for years.

== History ==
The idea of creating a Polish channel in Lithuania, TVP Wilno, appeared already in 2010, but its implementation failed. At the beginning of May 2016, after a five-year break, the permanent foreign correspondence office of TVP in Vilnius was reactivated. Work related to the launch of the channel resumed in July 2018, when Mirosław Ciunowicz, as the representative of the management board, started creating the editorial office of the TVP Wilno channel. The then head of the Chancellery of the Prime Minister, Michał Dworczyk, announced in August 2018 that the channel would be launched in the fall of the same year. On 11 January 2019, a member of the management board of TVP S.A. and one of the originators of the station, Maciej Stanecki, stated at the conference that under favorable conditions, TVP Wilno may launch at the turn of March and April 2019.

On 21 March 2019, the president of Telewizja Polska, Jacek Kurski, and the secretary of state for the Polish diaspora, European policy and public diplomacy at the Ministry of Foreign Affairs, Szymon Szynkowski vel Sęk, signed an agreement on the creation, co-financing, and distribution of TVP Wilno channel, which, according to the plans, was to be launched in May 2019. On 1 July 2019, Telewizja Polska announced the completion of the team and announced the start of tests in the same month. On 4 September 2019, during the 29th Economic Forum in Krynica, a press conference of Telewizja Polska was held regarding the inauguration of TVP Wilno.

The channel started broadcasting on 17 September 2019 at 17:30 Polish time (18:30 Lithuanian time). The first program broadcast was the Info Wilno news service. On the same day, the inaugural gala of TVP Wilno took place at the Polish Cultural Center in Vilnius, attended by: Prime Minister of the Republic of Poland Mateusz Morawiecki, Minister of Communication of Lithuania Jarosław Narkiewicz, head of the Chancellery of the Prime Minister Michał Dworczyk, Chancellor of the Government of Lithuania Algirdas Stončaitis, Polish ambassador to Lithuania - Urszula Doroszewska, Secretary of State for the Polish diaspora, European policy and public diplomacy - Szymon Szynkowski vel Sęk, chairman of the National Broadcasting Council - Witold Kołodziejski, president of TVP S.A. Jacek Kurski, member of the management board of TVP S.A. Marzena Paczuska and guests.

Initially, the TVP Wilno program consisted of the TVP Polonia schedule and a specially prepared block of programs for Lithuanian residents, broadcast during prime time from 5:30 p.m. to 8:00 p.m. Polish time (6:30 p.m. to 9:00 p.m. Lithuanian time). Currently, the station broadcasts an independent program every day, 24 hours a day.

On 2 May 2021, Prime Minister Mateusz Morawiecki and the head of the Lithuanian government, Ingrida Šimonytė, signed the foundation act for the expansion of the Polish Cultural Center in Vilnius and the new headquarters of TVP Wilno. In September 2021, the cornerstone for the expansion was laid. On 10 September, the program began broadcasting in high definition. In March 2023, a new, refreshed version of the TVP Wilno online portal was made available. Exactly two years after signing the foundation act – on 2 May 2023 – the new headquarters of TVP Wilno editorial office was opened, which houses, among others, modern studio and newsroom facilities.
