= TVP3 Łódź =

- Logo used since from January 2016
- Country: Poland

Programming
- Picture format: 16:9

Ownership
- Owner: Telewizja Polska

History
- Launched: 22 July 1956

Links
- Website: www.tvp.pl/lodz

TVP3 Łódź is one of the regional branches of the TVP, Poland's public television broadcaster. It serves the entire Łódź Voivodeship.

== Logo Evolution ==
2003-2006

2007-2013

2013-2016
