= TVP3 Bydgoszcz =

- Logo used since from January 2016
- Country: Poland

Programming
- Picture format: 16:9

Ownership
- Owner: Telewizja Polska

History
- Launched: 5 September 1994

Links
- Website: www.tvp.pl/bydgoszcz

Availability

Terrestrial
- Polish Digital: MUX 3

TVP3 Bydgoszcz is one of the regional branches of the TVP, Poland's public television broadcaster. It serves the entire Kuyavian-Pomeranian Voivodeship.
