= TVP3 Kraków =

- Logo used since from January 2016
- Country: Poland

Programming
- Picture format: 576i (16:9 SDTV)

Ownership
- Owner: Telewizja Polska

History
- Launched: May 1961

Links
- Website: krakow.tvp.pl

Availability

Terrestrial
- Polish Digital: MUX 3

TVP3 Kraków (TVP Cracow) is one of the regional branches of the TVP, Poland's public television broadcaster. It serves the entire Lesser Poland Voivodeship.

== Overview ==
The flagship of the branch is the news programme Kronika. The programme is broadcast for free, and can be accessed by internet on the TVP Stream webpage. It can also be watched through the TVP GO app.
