= TVP3 Poznań =

- Logo used since from January 2016
- Country: Poland

Programming
- Picture format: 576i (16:9 SDTV)

Ownership
- Owner: Telewizja Polska

History
- Launched: May 1, 1957
- Replaced by: TVP Poznan (2007-2013)

Links
- Website: poznan.tvp.pl

TVP3 Poznań (also known as Telewizja Poznań) is one of the regional branches of the TVP, Poland's public television broadcaster. It serves the entire Greater Poland Voivodeship.

From 1994 till 2002 it was branded PTV. It has been using its current name from 2002 with almost 10-year hiatus from October 6, 2007, till January 1, 2016 when it was branded TVP Poznań.

From October 6, 2007, till August 31, 2013 it served as a part of TVP Info.

== Programmes ==
Some of TVP Poznań's programmes include:

- Teleskop – local news from Greater Poland
- Telekurier (Telecourier) – nationwide programme covering social issues, within Poland

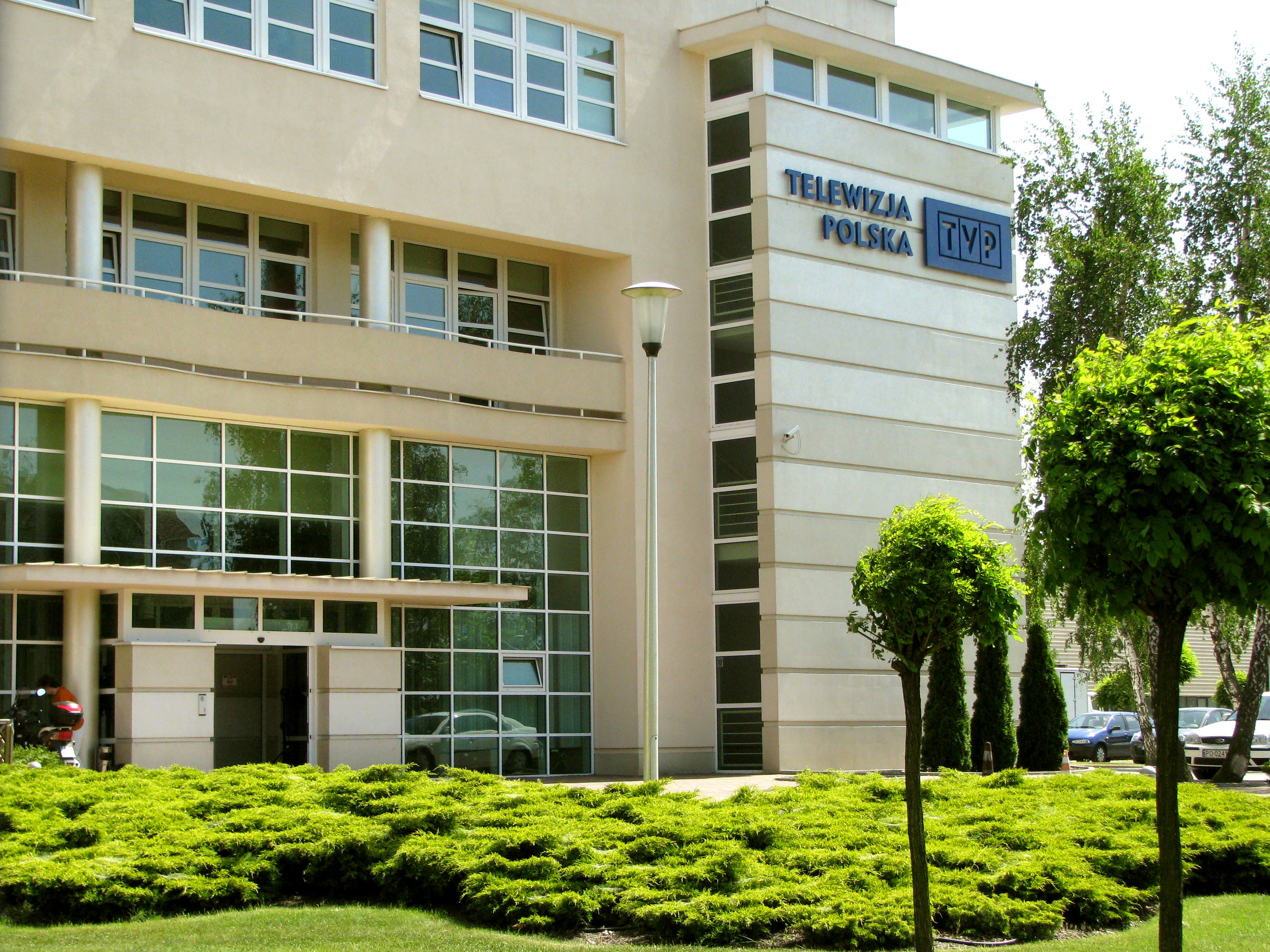
TVP3 Poznań headquarters
