= Rachocin =

- Village
- Location within Poland
- Coordinates: 52°53′28″N 19°39′42″E
- Country: Poland
- Voivodeship: Masovian
- County: Sierpc
- Gmina: Sierpc
- Population: 130

Rachocin [raˈxɔt͡ɕin] is a village in the administrative district of Gmina Sierpc, within Sierpc County, Masovian Voivodeship, in east-central Poland.
