= TVP3 Gdańsk =

- Logo used since from January 2016
- Pomeranian Voivodeship; Poland
- City: Gdańsk
- Channels: Digital: 33 (UHF); Virtual: 3

Programming
- Languages: Polish, Kashubian
- Affiliations: TVP

Ownership
- Owner: Telewizja Polska

History
- First air date: 6 March 1959

Links
- Website: www.tvp.pl/gdansk

TVP3 Gdańsk is one of the regional branches of the TVP, Poland's public television broadcaster. It serves the entire Pomeranian Voivodeship. In 1990–2010, there was an informative television programme Rodnô Zemia in the Kashubian language.
