= List of tallest structures in Europe =

This is a list of the tallest structures of any kind which exist in Europe. The list contains all types of structures, including guyed masts and oil drilling platforms of 350 metres (1,150 feet) or more. The list does not contain Warsaw Radio Mast which was the tallest structure in the world between 1974 and 8 August 1991 at 2120 ft (646.38 m), but does not exist anymore.

== Sortable list ==
Name	Structural type	Usage	Pinnacle height	Year	Country	Town	Coordinates	Remarks
Ostankino Tower	concrete tower	observation, FM-/TV-transmission	540 m (1,770 ft)	1967	Russia (Soviet Union at time of construction)	Moscow	55°49′10.94″N 37°36′41.79″E	The tallest structure in Europe. Fire in 2000 led to renovation
Troll A platform	offshore platform	gas drilling and production	472 m (1,549 ft)	1996	Norway	North Sea	60°40′N 3°40′E	303 m (994 ft) of height is below sea surface
Lakhta Center	skyscraper	offices and public spaces	462 m (1,516 ft)	2019	Russia	Saint Petersburg	59°59′13″N 30°10′41″E	The tallest building in Europe
Balashiha radio mast	guyed mast	longwave transmission	427 m (1,401 ft)	2005 (2014 extended)	Russia	Balashikha	55°47′34″N 37°53′29″E	
Longwave radio mast Hellissandur	guyed mast	longwave transmission	412 m (1,352 ft)	1963	Iceland	Hellissandur	64°54′26″N 23°55′20″W	Built as LORAN-C station. Converted by RÚV for LW broadcasts at 300kW.
Emley Moor radio mast	concrete tower	FM-/TV-transmission	385.5 m (1,265 ft)	1964	United Kingdom	Emley, West Yorkshire	53°36′45.73″N 1°39′57.81″W	Collapsed on 19 March 1969, due to icing. Replaced by 330 m (1,080 ft) tall concrete tower
Kyiv TV Tower	lattice tower	FM-/TV-transmission	385 m (1,263 ft)	1973	Ukraine (Soviet Union at time of construction)	Kyiv	50°28′16.49″N 30°27′11.97″E	Tallest lattice tower in the world. Damaged.
Gullfaks C	offshore platform	Oil drilling and production	380 m (1,250 ft)	1990	Norway	North Sea	61°12′53.80″N 2°16′25.93″E	217 m (712 ft) of height is below sea surface
Federation Tower: East Tower	skyscraper	offices	373.7 m (1,226 ft)	2016	Russia	Moscow	55°44′58″N 37°32′14″E	
Torreta de Guardamar	guyed mast	LF-transmission	370 m (1,210 ft)	1962	Spain	Guardamar del Segura	38°4′18.84″N 0°39′52.65″W	Radio mast used by Spanish Navy
Riga Radio and TV Tower	concrete tower	observation, FM-/TV-transmission	368 m (1,207 ft)	1987	Latvia	Riga	56°55′26.08″N 24°08′13.26″E	Tripod construction, resembling the Eiffel Tower
Berliner Fernsehturm	concrete tower	observation, FM-/TV-transmission	368 m (1,207 ft)	1969	Germany (East Germany at time of construction)	Berlin	52°31′14.91″N 13°24′33.95″E	Was 365 m (1,198 ft) tall when completed in 1969
Gerbrandy Tower	partially guyed tower	FM-/TV-transmission	366.8 m (1,203 ft)	1961	Netherlands	IJsselstein	52°00′34.38″N 05°03′14.53″E	Original height: 382.5 m (1,255 ft). 1987: height reduction to 375 m (1,230 ft). 2007: further height reduction to 366.8 m (1,203 ft)
Skelton transmitter	guyed mast	VLF-transmission	365 m (1,198 ft)	2001	United Kingdom	Skelton, Cumbria	54°43′54.5″N 2°52′58.9″W	Insulated against ground
Trbovlje Chimney	concrete tower	chimney	364 m (1,194 ft)	1976	Slovenia	Trbovlje	46°7′33.68″N 15°03′42.34″E	Tallest chimney in Europe
Sender Donebach	guyed masts	longwave transmission	363 m (1,191 ft)	1982	Germany (West Germany	Donebach	49°33′40.25″N 9°10′22.76″E ; 49°33′33.53″N 9°10′50.82″E	
Tambov TV Mast	guyed mast	FM-/TV-transmission	360 m (1,180 ft)	1991	Russia	Tambov	52°46′51.1″N 41°24′50.8″E	
Donetsk TV Mast	guyed mast	FM-/TV-transmission	360 m (1,180 ft)	1992	Ukraine	Donetsk	47°56′43.49″N 37°38′36.95″E	
Novosokolniki TV Mast	guyed mast	FM-/TV-transmission	360 m (1,180 ft)	1995	Russia	Novosokolniki	56°20′00″N 30°01′00″E	
Longwave transmitter Ingøy	guyed mast	longwave transmission	360 m (1,180 ft)	2000	Norway	Ingøya	71°04′17.5″N 24°05′15″E	Grounded, upfed
Sender Zehlendorf, new longwave transmission mast	guyed mast	longwave /FM-transmission	360 m (1,180 ft)	1979	Germany (East Germany at time of construction)	Zehlendorf bei Oranienburg, Brandenburg	52°47′41.87″N 13°23′9.5″E	Grounded structure with cage antenna
FM- and TV-mast Kosztowy	guyed mast	FM-/TV-transmission	358.7 m (1,177 ft)	1976	Poland	Kosztowy	50°11′16.75″N 19°06′57.97″E	
Richtfunkstelle Berlin-Frohnau	guyed mast	directional radio link	358.5 m (1,176 ft)	1978	Germany (West Germany at time of construction)	Berlin-Frohnau, Berlin	52°39′13.66″N 13°17′43.59″E	Demolished on 8 February 2009 by explosives
Pieczewo TV Mast	guyed mast	FM-/TV-transmission	356.5 m (1,170 ft)	1969	Poland	Olsztyn	53°45′11.94″N 20°31′5.33″E	
Endesa Termic	concrete tower	chimney	356 m (1,168 ft)	1974	Spain	As Pontes, Galicia	43°26′29″N 7°51′45.50″W	
RKS Liblice 2	guyed masts	AM transmission (now turned off)	355 m (1,165 ft)	1980	Czech Republic (Czechoslovakia at time of construction)	Liblice, Český Brod	50°3′43.37″N 14°53′11.27″E ; 50°3′47.12″N 14°53′12.84″E	Former tallest masts used until October 2025 for medium wave broadcasting, grounded structures with cage antennas. Demolished on October 15, 2026.
Strășeni TV Mast	guyed mast	FM-/TV-transmission	355 m (1,165 ft)	1985	Moldova (Soviet Union at time of construction)	Străşeni	47°07′18.97″N 28°33′54.27″E	
Lipetsk TV Mast	guyed mast	FM-/TV-transmission	354.6 m (1,163 ft)	1991	Russia	Lipetsk	52°40′13″N 39°28′59″E	
OKO: South Tower	skyscraper	residential, hotel	354.2 m (1,162 ft)	2015	Russia	Moscow	55°44′58″N 37°32′04″E	
TV Tower Vinnytsia	guyed mast	FM-/TV-transmission	354 m (1,161 ft)	1961	Ukraine (Soviet Union at time of construction)	Vinnytsia	49°14′39.6″N 28°25′45.99″E	Equipped with six crossbars running from the mast body to the guys
Sosnovy Longwave Radio Mast	guyed mast	longwave transmission	353.5 m (1,160 ft)	?	Belarus (Soviet Union at time of construction)	Sosnovy	53°24′10.71″N 28°31′16.32″E	
VLF transmitter DHO38	guyed masts	VLF-transmission	353 m (1,158 ft)	1982	Germany (West Germany at time of construction))	Saterland-Ramsloh, Lower Saxony	53°05′22.15″N 07°37′06.19″E ; 53°05′14.42″N 07°36′31.14″E ; 53°04′59.81″N 07°37′09.88″E ; 53°04′52.03″N 07°36′34.69″E ; 53°04′36.16″N 07°36′58.79″E ; 53°04′30.05″N 07°36′22.87″E ; 53°04′10.66″N 07°36′41.82″E ; 53°04′16.8″N 07°37′17.66″E	Insulated against ground
Chimney of Phoenix Copper Smelter	concrete tower	chimney	351.5 m (1,153 ft)	1995	Romania	Baia Mare	47°39′10.39″N 23°36′19.72″E	Tallest structure in Romania
Belmont mast	guyed mast	FM-/TV-transmission	351.5 m (1,153 ft)	1965	United Kingdom	Donington on Bain, Lincolnshire	53°20′9.07″N 0°10′19.11″W	Until 2010 tallest construction in the EU. Original height 385.6 m (1,265 ft). Extension to 387.7 m (1,272 ft) in 1967. Height reduction in 2010 to 351.5 m (1,153 ft)
Sender Zehlendorf, old longwave transmission mast	guyed mast	longwave transmission	351 m (1,152 ft)	1962	Germany (GDR at time of construction)	Zehlendorf, Brandenburg	52°47′41.87″N 13°23′9.5″E	Grounded structure with cage antenna, destroyed on 18 May 1978, due to aircraft collision
Longwave transmitter Allouis	guyed masts	longwave transmission	350 m (1,150 ft)	1974	France	Allouis	47°10′10.45″N 2°12′16.75″E ; 47°10′25.34″N 2°12′16.81″E	First mast built in 1952 was 308 m (1,010 ft) tall until 1974, second mast built in 1974
Sendemast SL3	guyed mast	longwave transmission	350 m (1,150 ft)	1968	Germany (GDR at time of construction)	Burg bei Magdeburg, Saxony-Anhalt	52°16′9.35″N 11°55′28.84″E	Collapsed on 18 February 1976
Mosolovo TV Mast	guyed mast	UHF/VHF-transmission	350 m (1,150 ft)	1968	Russia (Soviet Union at time of construction)	Mosolovo	54°16′17.9″N 40°33′26.34″E	
Kolodischi TV Mast	guyed mast	UHF/VHF-transmission	350 m (1,150 ft)	1970	Belarus (Soviet Union at time of construction)	Minsk	53°57′40.5″N 27°46′42.08″E	
Lipin Bor TV Mast	guyed mast	UHF/VHF-transmission	350 m (1,150 ft)	1970	Russia (Soviet Union at time of construction)	Lipin Bor	60°21′27″N 37°55′15″E	
Grigoriopol transmitter, large medium wave mast	guyed mast	MW-transmission	350 m (1,150 ft)	1968-1975	Moldova (Soviet Union at time of construction)	Maiac	47°17′21.4″N 29°26′0.25″E	Collapsed in 1997
Selizharovo TV Mast	guyed mast	UHF/VHF-transmission	350 m (1,150 ft)	1971	Russia (Soviet Union at time of construction)	Selizharovo	56°55′03″N 33°34′47″E	
Pinerovka TV Mast	guyed mast	UHF/VHF-transmission	350 m (1,150 ft)	1971	Russia (Soviet Union at time of construction)	Pinerovka	51°35′20″N 43°01′36″E	
Ushachi TV Mast	guyed mast	UHF/VHF-transmission	350 m (1,150 ft)	1974	Belarus (Soviet Union at time of construction)	Ushachy	55°14′40.43″N 28°38′30.95″E	
Yershov TV Mast	guyed mast	UHF/VHF-transmission	350 m (1,150 ft)	1974	Russia (Soviet Union at time of construction)	Yershov	51°21′51″N 48°17′58″E	
Tula TV Mast	guyed mast	UHF/VHF-transmission	350 m (1,150 ft)	1975/76	Russia (Soviet Union at time of construction)	Tula	54°8′27″N 37°35′03″E	
Novo-Bykovo TV Mast	guyed mast	UHF/VHF-transmission	350 m (1,150 ft)	1977	Russia (Soviet Union at time of construction)	Vladimir	56°01′10″N 40°50′25″E	
Rodniki TV Mast	guyed mast	UHF/VHF-transmission	350 m (1,150 ft)	1977	Russia (Soviet Union at time of construction)	Rodniki	57°05′24″N 41°44′02″E	
Volga TV Mast	guyed mast	UHF/VHF-transmission	350 m (1,150 ft)	1978	Russia (Soviet Union at time of construction)	Rybinsk	57°57′53″N 38°21′14″E	
Kanevskaya TV Mast	guyed mast	UHF/VHF-transmission	350 m (1,150 ft)	1979	Russia (Soviet Union at time of construction)	Kanevskaya	46°03′27.18″N 38°57′57.43″E	
Stavropol TV Mast	guyed mast	UHF/VHF-transmission	350 m (1,150 ft)	1979	Russia (Soviet Union at time of construction)	Stavropol	45°00′44.04″N 41°51′11.54″E	
Livny TV Mast	guyed mast	UHF/VHF-transmission	350 m (1,150 ft)	1979?	Russia (Soviet Union at time of construction)	Livny	52°27′03″N 37°30′10″E	
Sovetsky TV Mast	guyed mast	UHF/VHF-transmission	350 m (1,150 ft)	1984	Russia (Soviet Union at time of construction)	Sovetsky, Mari El Republic	56°45′17″N 48°32′05″E	
Smogiri TV Mast	guyed mast	UHF/VHF-transmission	350 m (1,150 ft)	1986	Russia (Soviet Union at time of construction)	Smolensk	55°02′08″N 32°22′52″E	
Varaksino TV Mast	guyed mast	UHF/VHF-transmission	350 m (1,150 ft)	1988	Russia (Soviet Union at time of construction)	Izhevsk	56°52′13.44″N 53°03′03.02″E	
Tsivilsk TV Mast	guyed mast	UHF/VHF-transmission	350 m (1,150 ft)	1990	Russia (Soviet Union at time of construction)	Tsivilsk	55°48′22″N 47°26′42″E	
Galich TV Mast	guyed mast	UHF/VHF-transmission	350 m (1,150 ft)	1991	Russia	Galich	58°26′30″N 42°37′38″E	Unused
Polykovichi TV Mast	guyed mast	UHF/VHF-transmission	350 m (1,150 ft)	?	Belarus	Mahilyow/Polykovichi	53°59′25.22″N 30°19′38.54″E	
Novaya Strazha TV Mast	guyed mast	UHF/VHF-transmission	350 m (1,150 ft)	?	Belarus	Slonim	53°03′51″N 25°28′30″E	
Smetanichi TV Mast	guyed mast	UHF/VHF-transmission	350 m (1,150 ft)	?	Belarus	Smetanichi	52°13′27.87″N 28°30′44.4″E	
HWU transmitter, central mast	guyed mast	VLF-transmission	350 m (1,150 ft)	?	France	Rosnay	46°42′47.49″N 1°14′42.22″E	

=== History ===
The following is a list of structures that were historically the tallest in Europe.

From	To	Structure	Location	Height
1180	1240	Malmesbury Abbey Tower	Malmesbury, United Kingdom	131.3 m (431 ft)
1240	1311	Tower of Old St Paul's Cathedral	London, United Kingdom	150 m (490 ft)
1311	1549	Tower of Lincoln Cathedral	Lincoln, United Kingdom	159.7 m (524 ft)
1549	1647	Tower of St Mary's church	Stralsund, Germany	151 m (495 ft)
1647	1874	Tower of Strasbourg Cathedral	Strasbourg, France	142 m (466 ft)
1874	1876	Tower of St. Nikolai	Hamburg, Germany	147 m (482 ft)
1876	1880	Tower of Rouen Cathedral	Rouen, France	151 m (495 ft)
1880	1889	Tower of Cologne Cathedral	Cologne, Germany	157.38 m (516.3 ft)
1889	1933	Eiffel Tower	Paris, France	312 m (1,024 ft)
1933	1939	Lakihegy Tower	Szigetszentmiklós, Hungary	314 m (1,030 ft)
1939	1946	Deutschlandsender Herzberg/Elster	Herzberg, Germany	337 m (1,106 ft)
1946	1949	Lakihegy Tower	Szigetszentmiklós, Hungary	314 m (1,030 ft)
1949	1961	Raszyn radio transmitter	Łazy, Poland	335 m (1,099 ft)
1961	1963	Gerbrandy Tower	IJsselstein, Netherlands	382.5 m (1,255 ft)
1963	1967	Longwave radio mast Hellissandur	Hellissandur, Iceland	412 m (1,352 ft)
1967	1974	Ostankino Tower	Moscow, Russia	540.1 m (1,772 ft)
1974	1991	Warsaw Radio Mast	Konstantynów, Poland	646.38 m (2,120.7 ft)
1991	present	Ostankino Tower	Moscow, Russia	540.1 m (1,772 ft)

== Gallery ==
Some of the highest structures in Europe

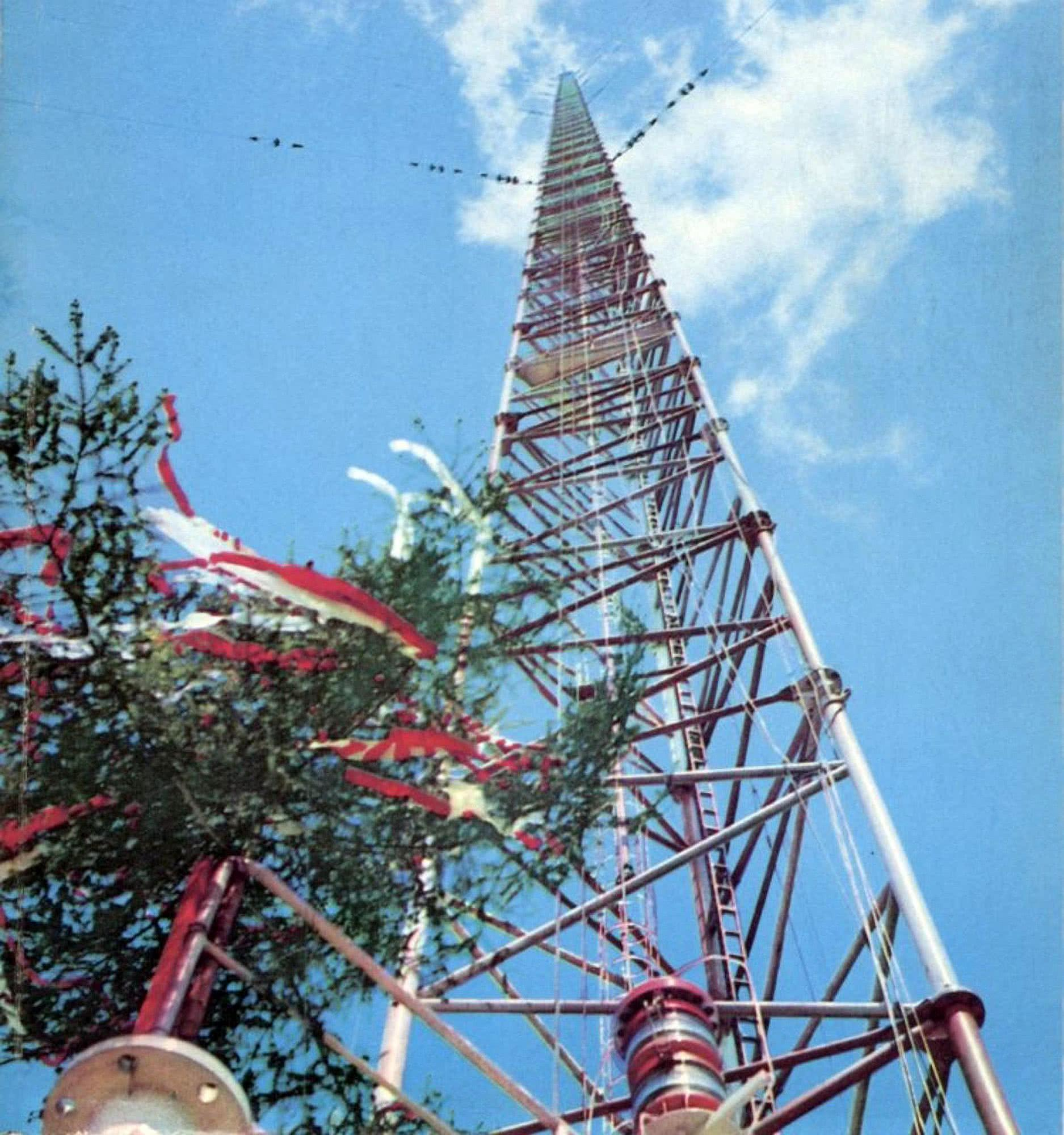
Warsaw Radio Mast, was the tallest structure in the world before it collapsed in 1991

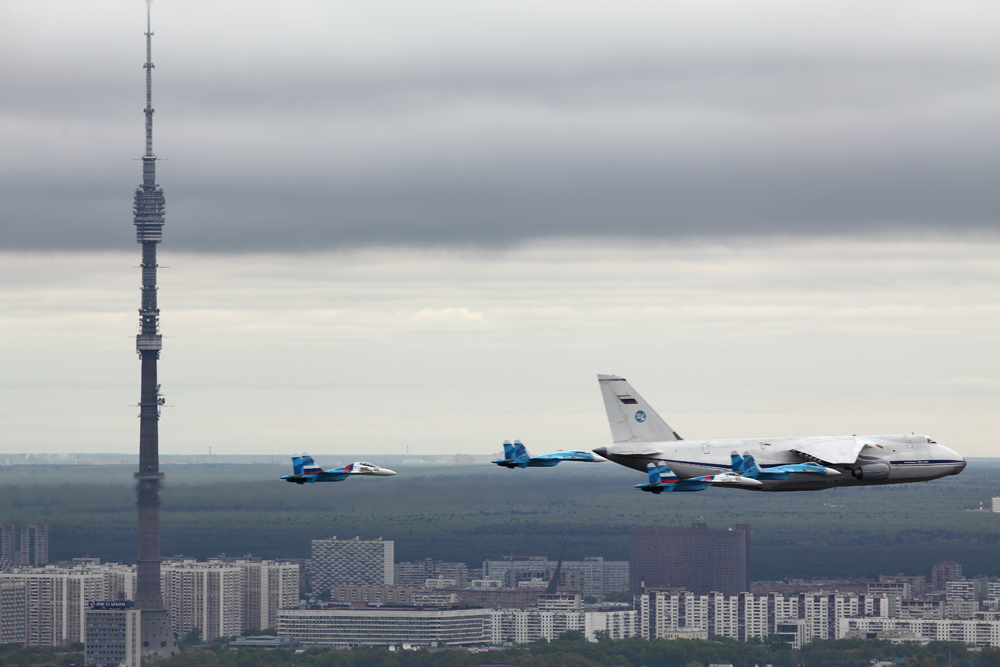
Ostankino TV Tower, the tallest structure in Europe

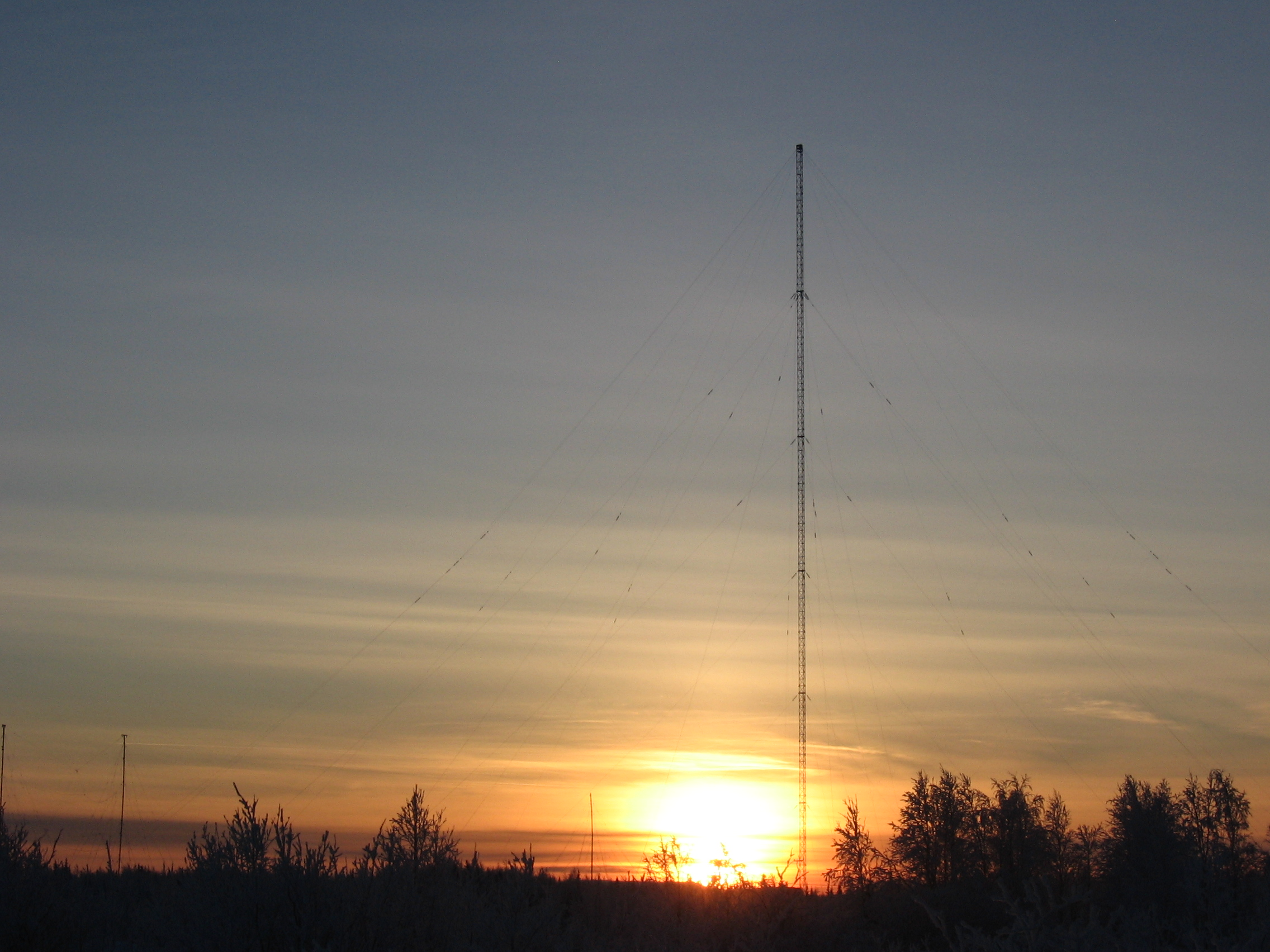
Inta CHAYKA-Mast

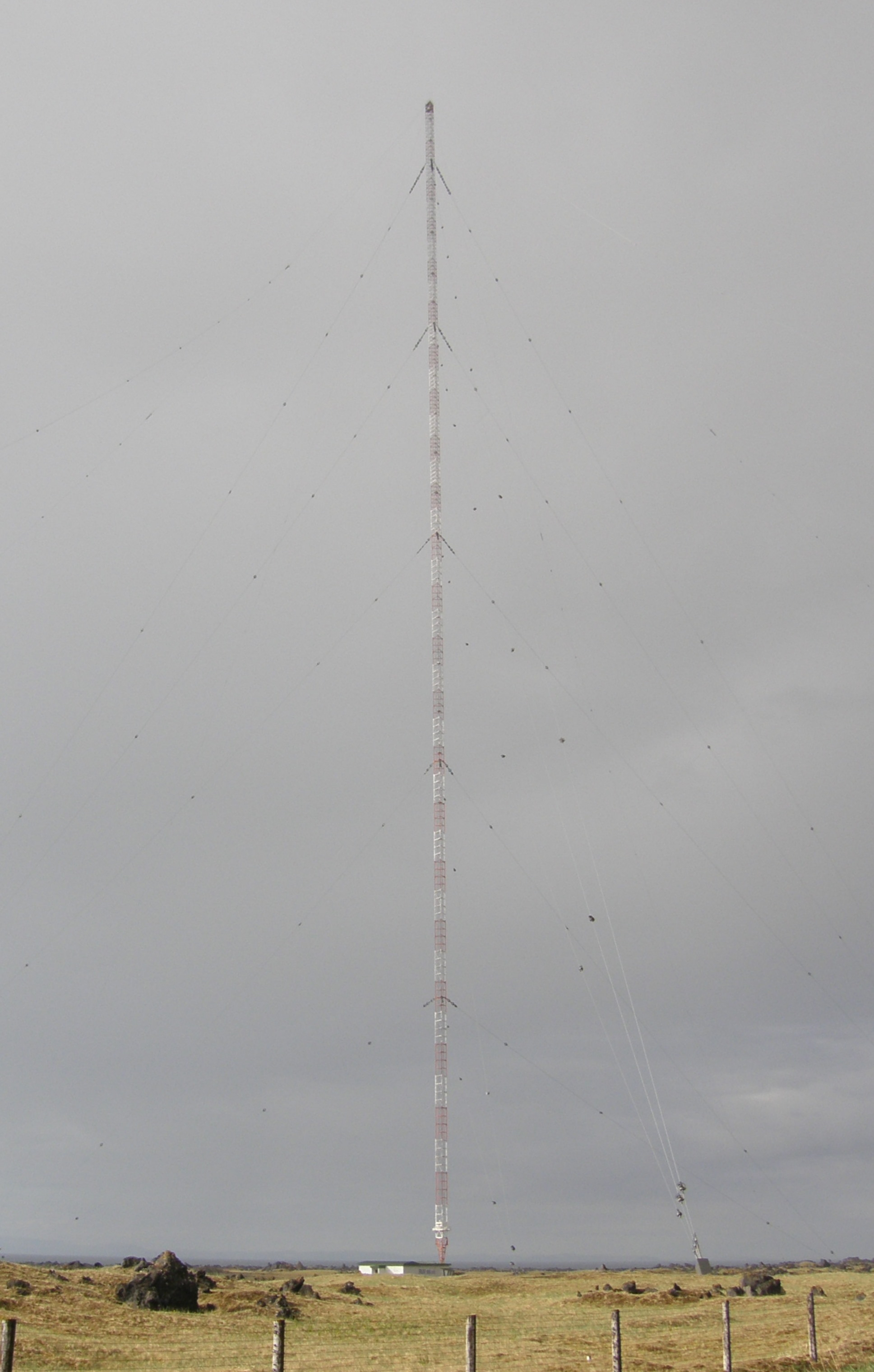
Hellissandur Longwave Radio Mast

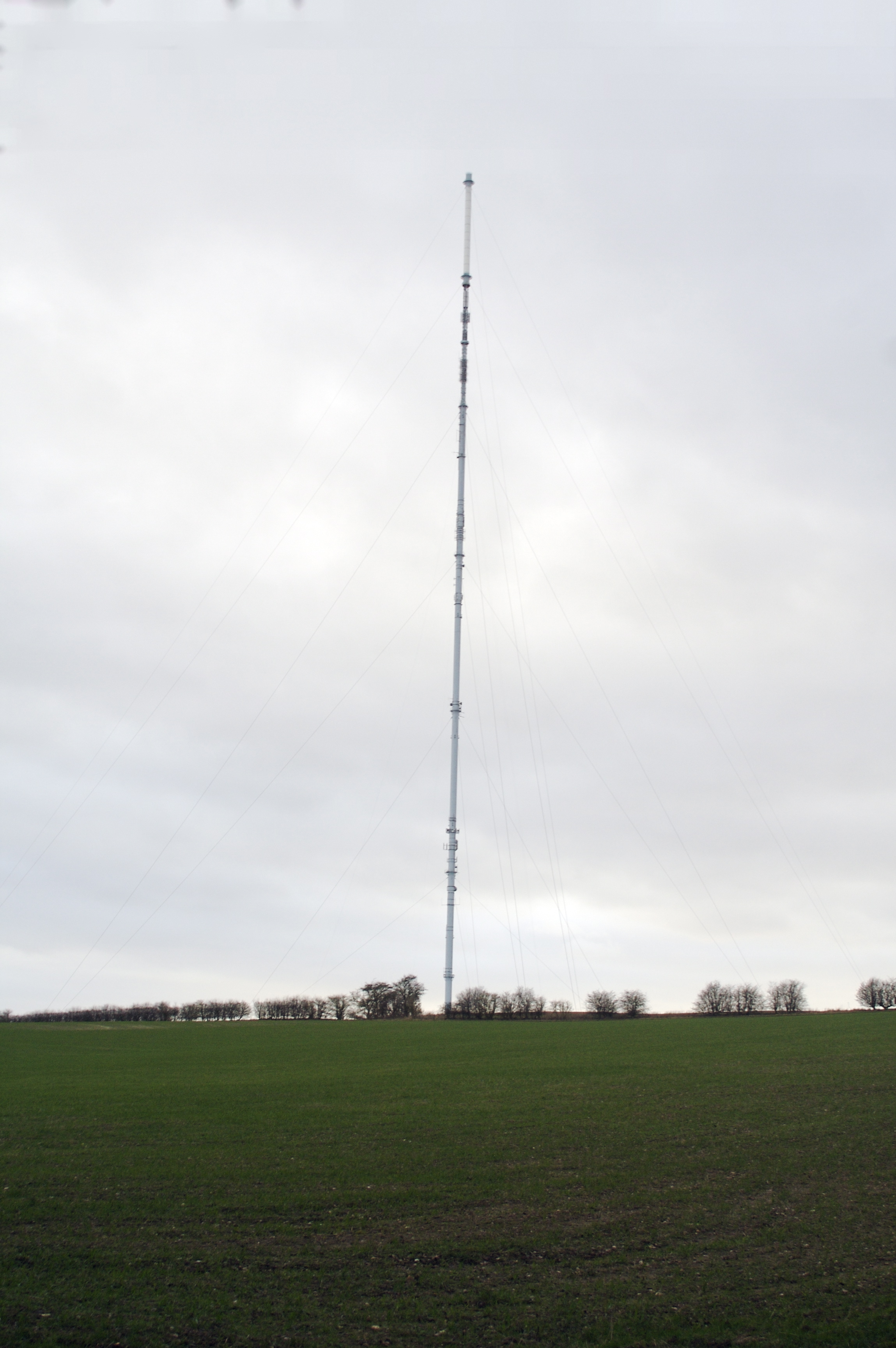
Belmont transmitting station

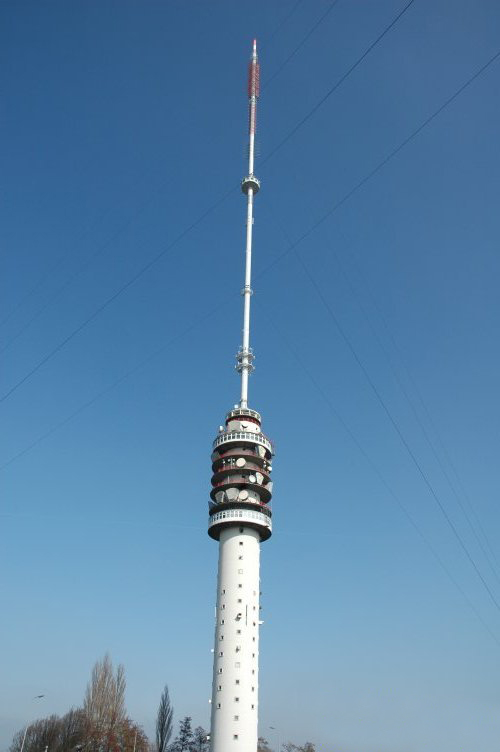
Gerbrandy Tower in 2006

Fernsehturm Berlin

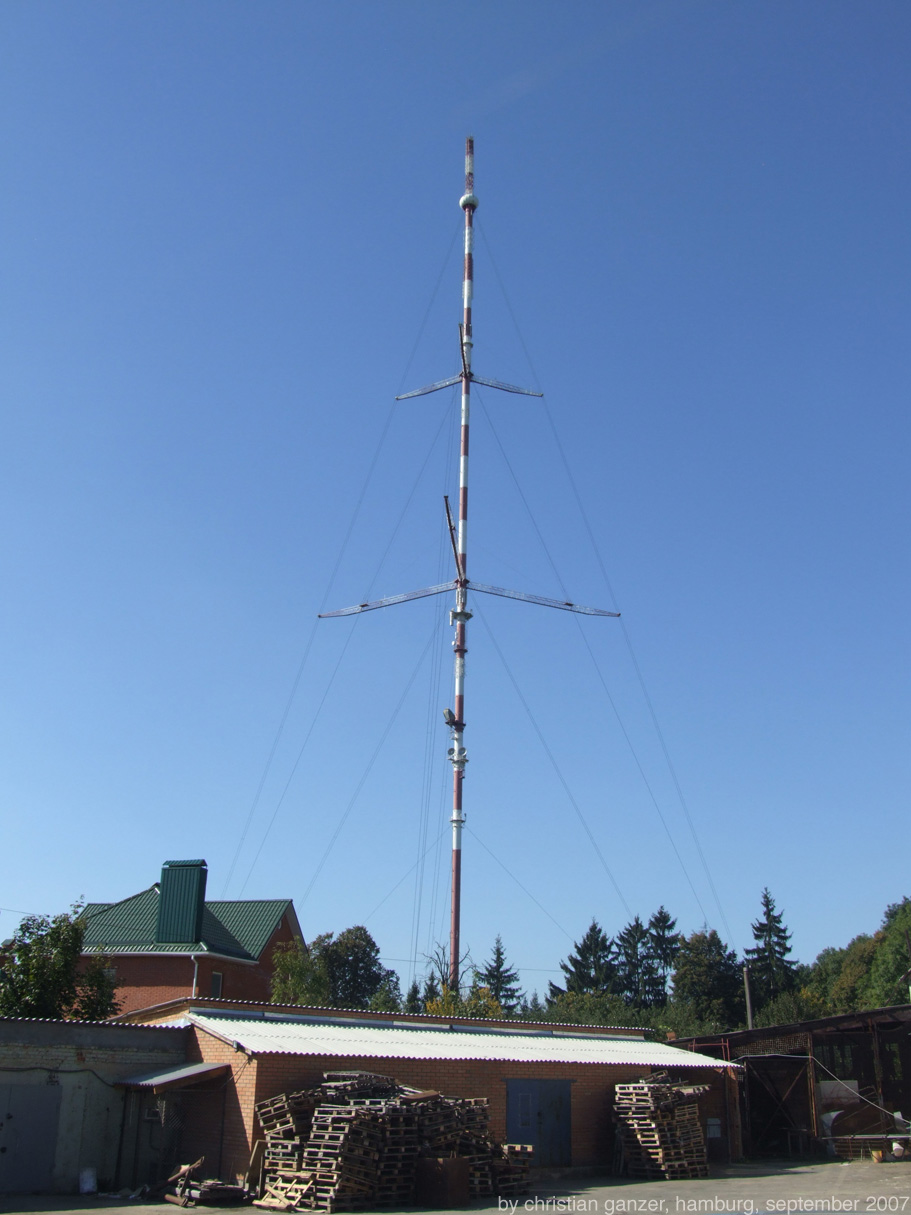
TV Tower Vinnytsia

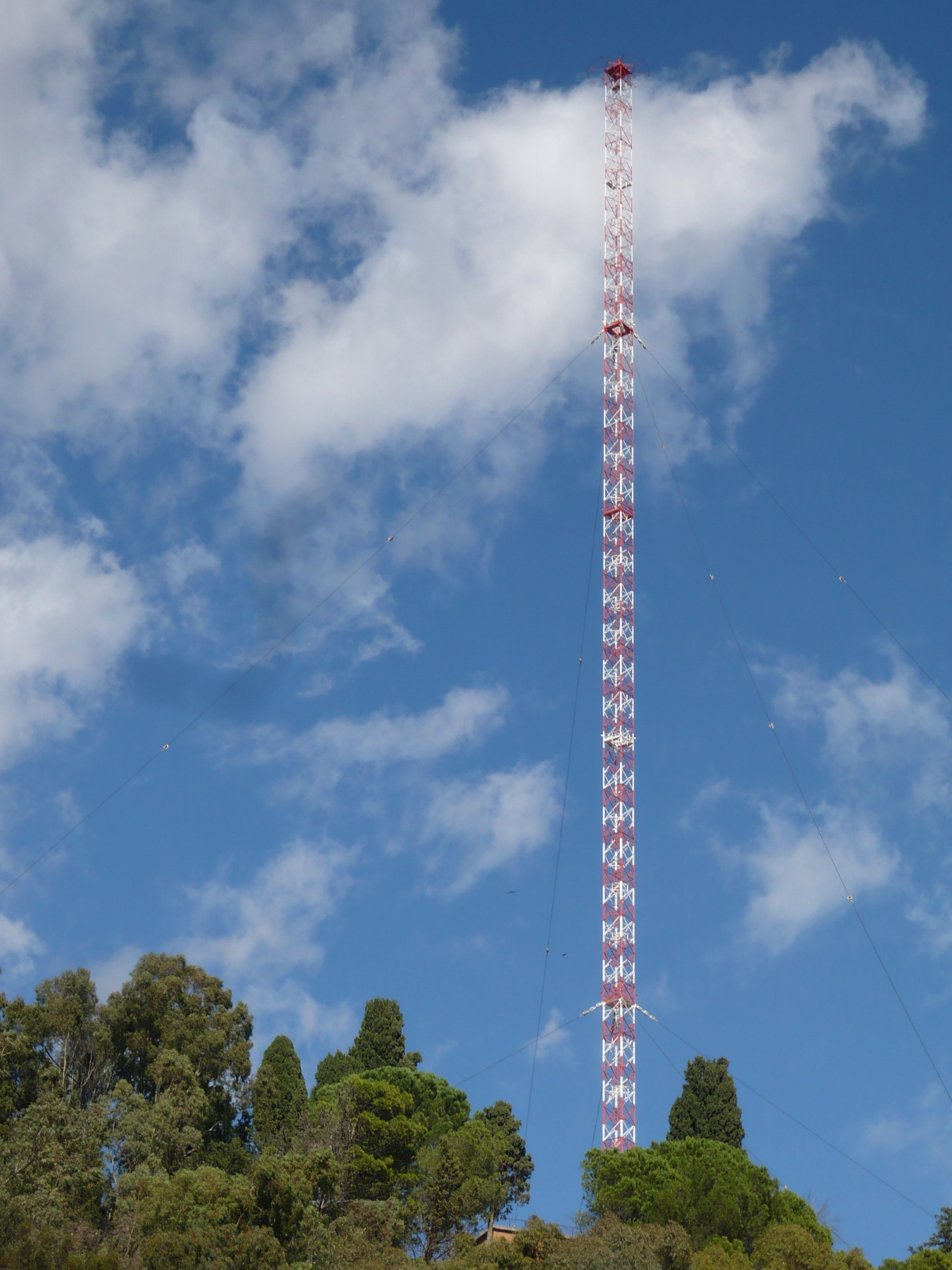
Antenna RAI of Caltanissetta the tallest structure in Italy

== See also ==
- List of tallest structures in the world
- List of tallest buildings in Europe
- List of tallest buildings in Scandinavia
- List of tallest buildings in the Balkans
- List of tallest buildings in the Baltic states
