= Novorepnoye =

Village in Saratov Oblast, Russia

Coordinates: 51°04′38″N 48°25′35″E

Novorepnoye (Russian: Новорепноe; Ukrainian: Новоріпне, romanized: Novoripne) is a village in Yershovsky District, Saratov Oblast, European Russia. The village is also the administrative center of the Novorepnoye rural settlement.

The population of the village is 828 (2010).

== Geography ==
The village is located on the right bank of the Bolshoy Uzen River and 40 km south of the district administrative center, the city of Yershov.

== History ==
Located in the historical region of Yellow Ukraine, the selo of Novorepnoye is mentioned in the List of inhabited places of the Russian Empire according to the information from 1859. In 1859, more than 3200 inhabitants lived in the settlement, there was an Orthodox church, a rural school, a post station, and a fair was held. The village belonged to the Novouzensky Uyezd of the Samara Governorate at the time.

In the List of settlements of the Samara Governorate in 1889, it is indicated that Russians, Mordovians and Poles lived in the village which made a total of 5,867 people.

According to the list of settlements of the Samara Governorate in 1910, the village belonged to the Novorepnoye volost, 3,568 men and 3,547 women lived here, the village was inhabited by former state peasants, mainly Russian, Orthodox and sectarians, the village had a church, parish, 3 schools and 2 libraries.

In 1919, the village was included in the Saratov province as part of the Novouzensky Uyezd.

From 1935 to 1960, it was the district center of Novorepnoye Raion of Saratov Oblast.

== Population ==
1859	1889	1897	1910	1939	1959	2002
3250	5867	6118	7115	3124	2400	1962

== Notable people ==
- Klavdiya Bogachyova (1890–1961) — Russian Imperial female grenadier, soldier.
- Vladimir Gusev (1938-?) — Soviet deputy.
- Vasily Zaytsev (1912–1944) — Soviet Air Force pilot.
- Nikolay Troitsky (1931–2014) — Soviet and Russian historian.
