= Łazy, Piaseczno County =

Łazy
- Village
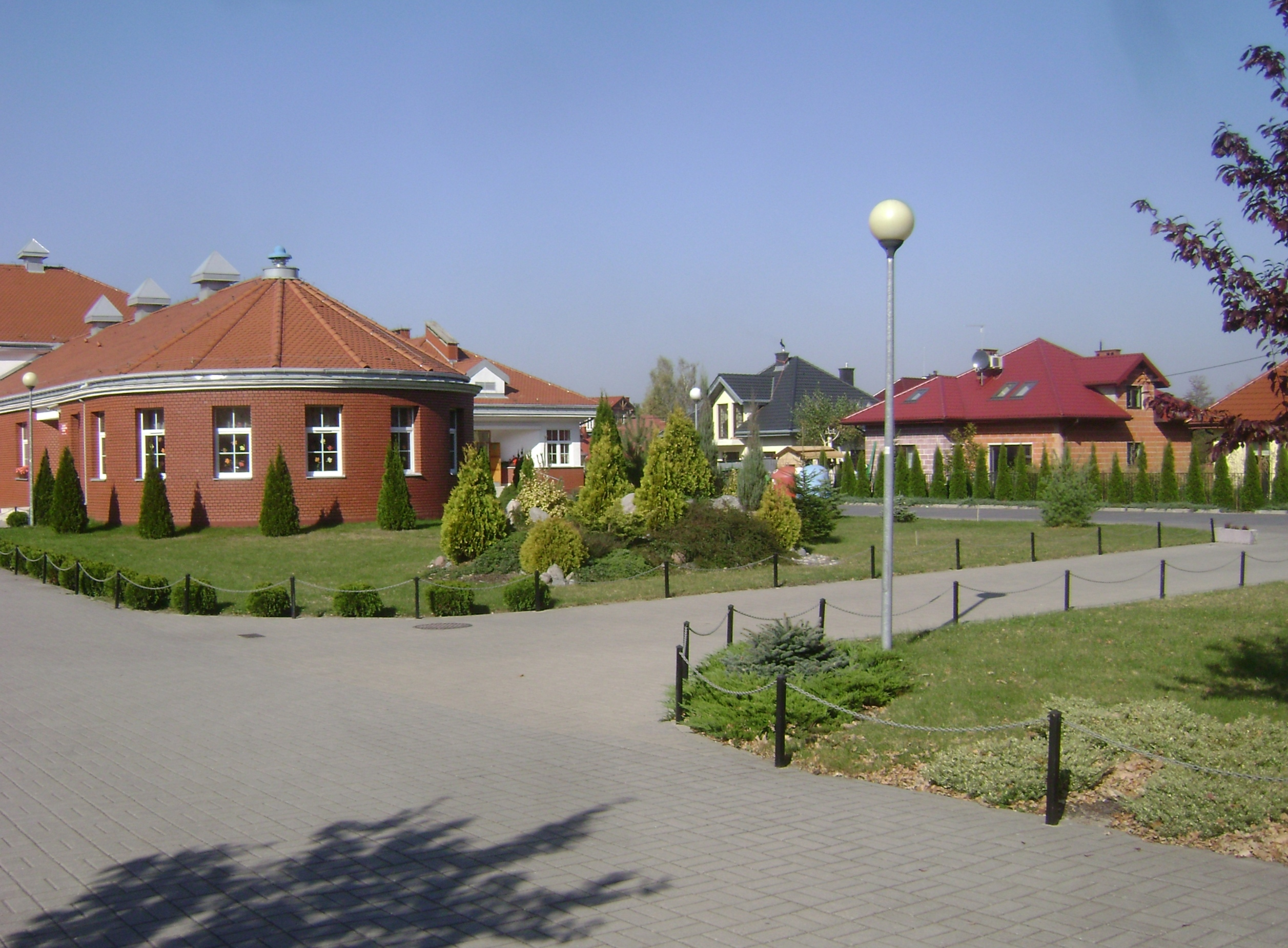

- Location within Poland
- Coordinates: 52°4′56″N 20°52′43″E
- Country: Poland
- Voivodeship: Masovian
- County: Piaseczno
- Gmina: Lesznowola

Population
  - Total: 1,300
- Time zone: UTC+1 (CET)
  - Summer (DST): UTC+2 (CEST)

Łazy [ˈwazɨ] is a village in the administrative district of Gmina Lesznowola, within Piaseczno County, Masovian Voivodeship, in east-central Poland.

The village is near located the Raszyn radio transmitter.

Six Polish citizens were murdered by Nazi Germany in the village during World War II.
