= Phoenix Copper Smelter =

Coordinates: 47°39′10.5″N 23°36′19.4″E

Cuprom Phoenix Copper Smelter
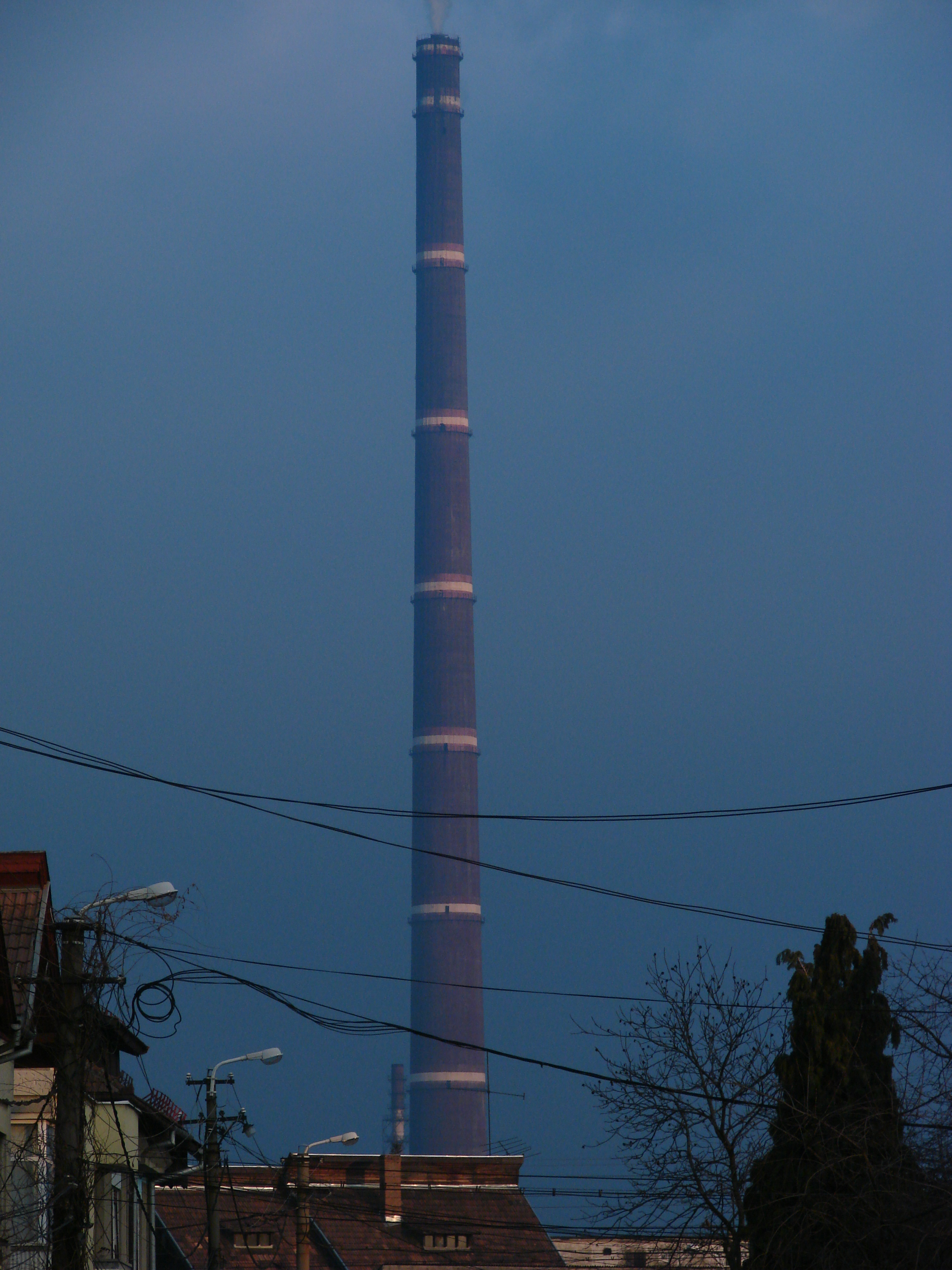
- The Copper Smelter in 2008
- Interactive map of the Cuprom Phoenix Copper Smelter area

General information
- Status: Completed
- Location: Strada Eliberării 42, Baia Mare, Romania
- Construction started: 1993
- Completed: 1995
- Cost: US$11 million
- Owner: Government of Romania

Design and construction
- Main contractor: Gip Grup SRL

The Cuprom Phoenix Copper Smelter is a smelter of sulfurous copper ores in Baia Mare, Romania. It has a 351.5 m (1,153 ft) chimney.

Construction began in 1993, finished in 1995, making it the tallest artificial structure in Romania and the third tallest chimney in Europe. The base of the tower has a diameter of 20 m (66 ft) while the top has a diameter of 9 m (30 ft).

Due to the acid rain caused by it, and the fact that Baia Mare became the third largest polluted city in Romania, following only Bucharest and Galați, the chimney is no longer in use and became a tourist attraction. In 2022, a €65 million rehabilitation project of the facilities was announced. The old copper plant will be replaced by a photovoltaic park, while the tower will be set up for tourist purposes, and will be equipped with three elevators, two internal and one external, made of glass, with an observation platform mounted at the top.

== See also ==
- List of chimneys
- List of tallest chimneys in the world
- List of tallest structures in Europe
