= Mostostal =

Mostostal is a steel construction group of companies based in Warsaw, Poland, part of one of the largest industrial conglomerate companies in Poland.

The company produces a wide range of steel industrial structures. Projects have included chemical plants and radio masts.

== History ==
The company was formed in 1945 in Kraków, shortly afterwards moved its headquarters to Zabrze, then to Warsaw.

In the 1970s, the company built the radio mast in Konstantynów, which was the tallest structure on Earth until its collapse in 1991.

== See also ==
- Companies based in Warsaw
- Steel companies of Poland
