= Raszyn radio transmitter =

Raszyn Transmitter
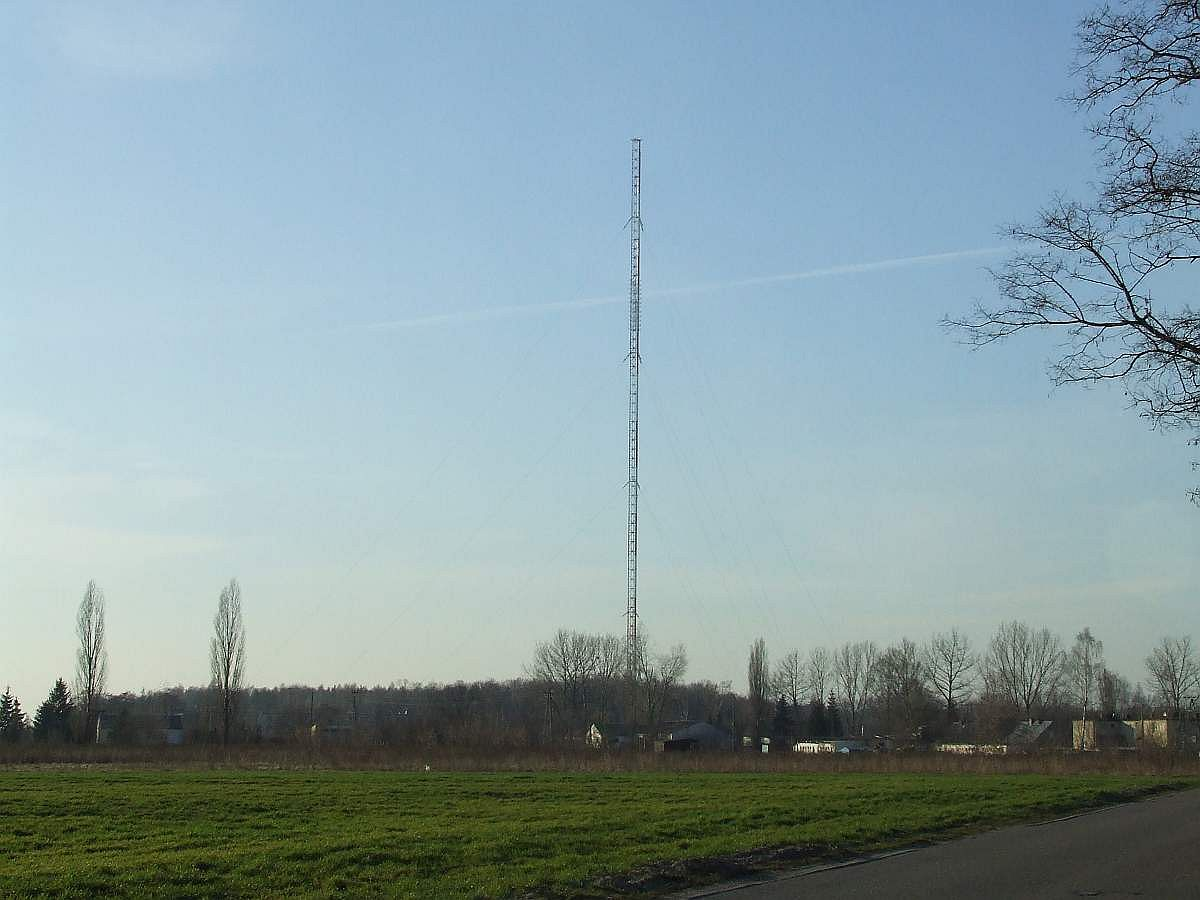
- Interactive map of the Raszyn Transmitter area

General information
- Status: Completed
- Type: FM and TV Mast
- Location: Łazy (Lesznowola)
- Completed: 1931

Height
- Height: 335 m (1,099.08 ft)

Raszyn Transmitter
- Location within Poland
- Coordinates: 52°04′24″N 20°53′08″E

The longwave transmitter Raszyn is a longwave broadcasting transmitter near Raszyn, Poland. It was built in 1931 and rebuilt in 1949. The designer of the mast is unknown. It has been claimed that the rebuilt tower consists of sections from the radio mast of former Deutschlandsender Herzberg/Elster; however, there is no proof of this theory. The mast of the Raszyn longwave transmitter was, at inauguration, the second-tallest man-made structure on earth and until 1962, with a height of 335 metres (1,099 feet), the tallest structure in Europe. The tower's height is 1,099 feet (335 meters).

The transmitter was, until the inauguration of Warsaw radio mast in Konstantynów, the central longwave broadcasting facility of Poland.

Since 1978 from this facility during daytime a second program in the longwave range was transmitted on AM-LW (long wave)198 kHz/1,515 meters (formerly the frequency was used by Polskie Radio Parlament). After the collapse of Warsaw radio mast in 1991 this facility was used until the inauguration of the new longwave-transmitter Solec Kujawski for transmissions of the first program of the Polish Broadcasting Service on AM-LW (longwave) 225 kHz/1,333 meters. Because it has never been possible to transmit from Raszyn on both longwave frequencies of the Polish Broadcasting Company simultaneously due to its orientation towards the east and risk of interference, no transmissions on the second longwave frequency of the Polish Broadcasting Company (AM-LW 198 kHz/1515 meters) took place between 1991 and 1999.

The radio mast is, since the collapse of the Warsaw radio mast, the sixth tallest structure in Poland. On July 31, 2009, Polish Radio Parlament discontinued their broadcast on AM-LW (longwave) due to the Great Recession, and the longwave transmitter has been turned off.

The location was used for transmitting purposes from 1931 when the then-Polish Radio Co. opened their new, modern 120 kW transmitter that used two 280 m (920 ft) tall guyed steel lattice masts to support a T-shaped antenna. In the late 1930s, works started to increase the output power to 600 kW, but the works were not completed before start of the World War II. One of the masts was destroyed by Polish Army engineers to prevent the Germans from using the station.

== Transmitted Programmes ==
=== Radio ===
Program	Frequency	Power kW	Polarisation	Antenna Diagram
Polskie Radio Program I	102.4 MHz	120	Vertical	D
Polskie Radio Program III	98.8 MHz	120	Vertical	D
RMF FM	91.0 MHz	120	Vertical	D

== Digital Television MPEG 4 ==
Multiplex Number	Programme in Multiplex	Frequency MHz	Channel	ERP kW	Polarisation	Antenna Diagram	Modulation
MUX 1	TVP1; Stopklatka TV; TVP ABC; TV Trwam; Eska TV; TTV; Polo TV; ATM Rozrywka	710	58	100	Horizontal	ND	64 QAM
MUX 2	Polsat; TVN; TV4; TV Puls; TVN 7; Puls 2; TV6; Super Polsat	690	48	100	Horizontal	ND	64 QAM
MUX 3	TVP1 HD; TVP2 HD; TVP Warszawa; TVP Kultura; TVP Historia; TVP Polonia; TVP Rozrywka; TVP Info	522	27	130	Horizontal	ND	64 QAM

== See also ==
- List of transmission sites - Radio Raszyn mast is 335 metres (1,099 feet) tall.
