= Yershov, Saratov Oblast =

Town in Saratov Oblast, Russia

Yershov Ершов
- Town
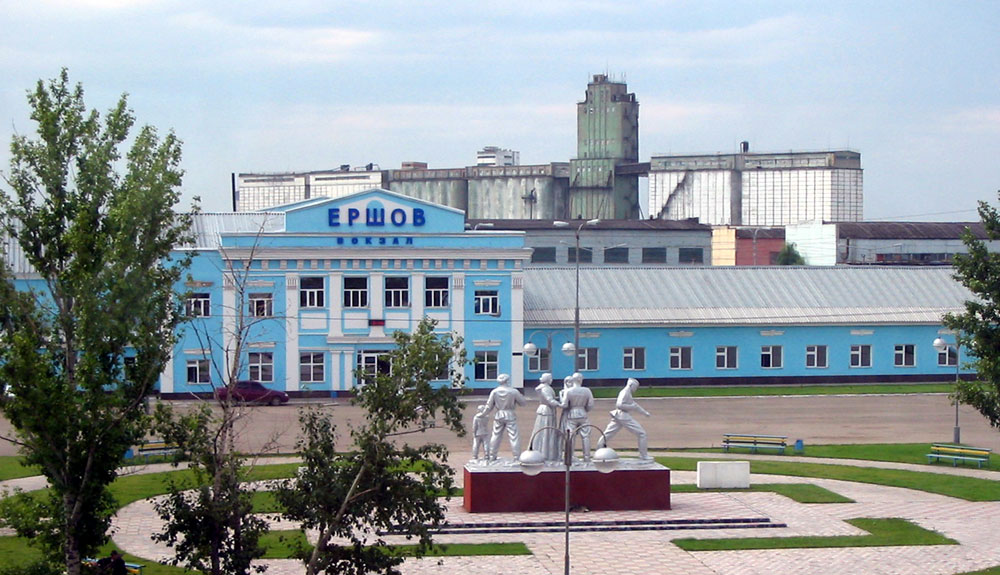
- Yershov railway station

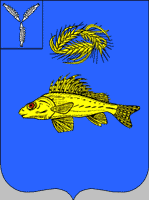
- Coat of arms
- Interactive map of Yershov
- Location of Yershov Yershov (Saratov Oblast)
- Coordinates: 51°21′N 48°16′E
- Country: Russia
- Federal subject: Saratov Oblast
- Administrative district: Yershovsky District
- Founded: 1894
- Town status since: 1963
- Elevation: 100 m (330 ft)

Population (2010 Census)
  - Total: 21,448
  - Estimate (2021): 18,095 (−15.6%)

Administrative status
  - Capital of: Yershovsky District

Municipal status
  - Municipal district: Yershovsky Municipal District
  - Urban settlement: Yershov Urban Settlement
  - Capital of: Yershovsky Municipal District, Yershov Urban Settlement
- Time zone: UTC+4 (MSK+1)
- Postal codes: 413500, 413502, 413503
- Dialing code: +7 84564
- OKTMO ID: 63617101001

Yershov (Russian: Ершо́в) is a town and the administrative center of Yershovsky District in Saratov Oblast, Russia, located in the upper streams of the Maly Uzen River, 178 kilometers (111 mi) east of Saratov, the administrative center of the oblast. Population: 21,448 (2010 census); 23,848 (2002 census); 24,468 (1989 Soviet census).

== History ==
It was founded as a settlement serving the Yershovo railway station, which was opened in 1893 and named after the engineer who was in charge of building it. Town status was granted to Yershov in 1963.

In 1897, Yershov was first mentioned in the report of the Zemstvo Council of Novouzensky district as a settlement. Until October 1917, Yershov was part of the Novouzensky district of the Samara province.

By the beginning of the First World War, several private enterprises had opened in the city, and the population reached 1,000 people. At that time, the population mainly consisted of railroad workers.

During the years of Soviet rule, the city of Yershov was greatly transformed: the first newspaper was founded, the city became the district center, and in 1963 it received the status of a city.

There were no military operations in the city during the Second World War.

== Geography ==
=== Climate ===
Climate data for Yershov
Month	Jan	Feb	Mar	Apr	May	Jun	Jul	Aug	Sep	Oct	Nov	Dec	Year
Record high °C (°F)	7.3 (45.1)	8.4 (47.1)	20.2 (68.4)	30.5 (86.9)	36.6 (97.9)	40.1 (104.2)	41.5 (106.7)	41.2 (106.2)	36.1 (97.0)	26.8 (80.2)	17.7 (63.9)	8.6 (47.5)	41.5 (106.7)
Mean daily maximum °C (°F)	−6.3 (20.7)	−5.9 (21.4)	0.8 (33.4)	13.8 (56.8)	22.5 (72.5)	27.3 (81.1)	29.7 (85.5)	28.4 (83.1)	21.2 (70.2)	11.9 (53.4)	1.7 (35.1)	−4.6 (23.7)	11.7 (53.1)
Daily mean °C (°F)	−9.5 (14.9)	−9.7 (14.5)	−3.3 (26.1)	7.7 (45.9)	15.9 (60.6)	20.6 (69.1)	22.9 (73.2)	21.3 (70.3)	14.5 (58.1)	6.7 (44.1)	−1.6 (29.1)	−7.7 (18.1)	6.5 (43.7)
Mean daily minimum °C (°F)	−12.9 (8.8)	−13.3 (8.1)	−7.1 (19.2)	2.4 (36.3)	9.3 (48.7)	14.0 (57.2)	16.2 (61.2)	14.6 (58.3)	8.8 (47.8)	2.5 (36.5)	−4.4 (24.1)	−10.8 (12.6)	1.6 (34.9)
Record low °C (°F)	−40.7 (−41.3)	−35.8 (−32.4)	−30.7 (−23.3)	−19.0 (−2.2)	−4.6 (23.7)	−0.6 (30.9)	6.0 (42.8)	1.9 (35.4)	−6.2 (20.8)	−15.0 (5.0)	−28.9 (−20.0)	−35.8 (−32.4)	−40.7 (−41.3)
Average precipitation mm (inches)	29 (1.1)	23 (0.9)	28 (1.1)	30 (1.2)	32 (1.3)	39 (1.5)	34 (1.3)	27 (1.1)	42 (1.7)	36 (1.4)	28 (1.1)	30 (1.2)	378 (14.9)
Source: www.pogodaiklimat.ru

== Administrative and municipal status ==
Within the framework of administrative divisions, Yershov serves as the administrative center of Yershovsky District, to which it is directly subordinated. As a municipal division, the town of Yershov, together with four rural localities, is incorporated within Yershovsky Municipal District as Yershov Urban Settlement.
