= Solec Kujawski radio transmitter =

Longwave radio transmitter in Poland

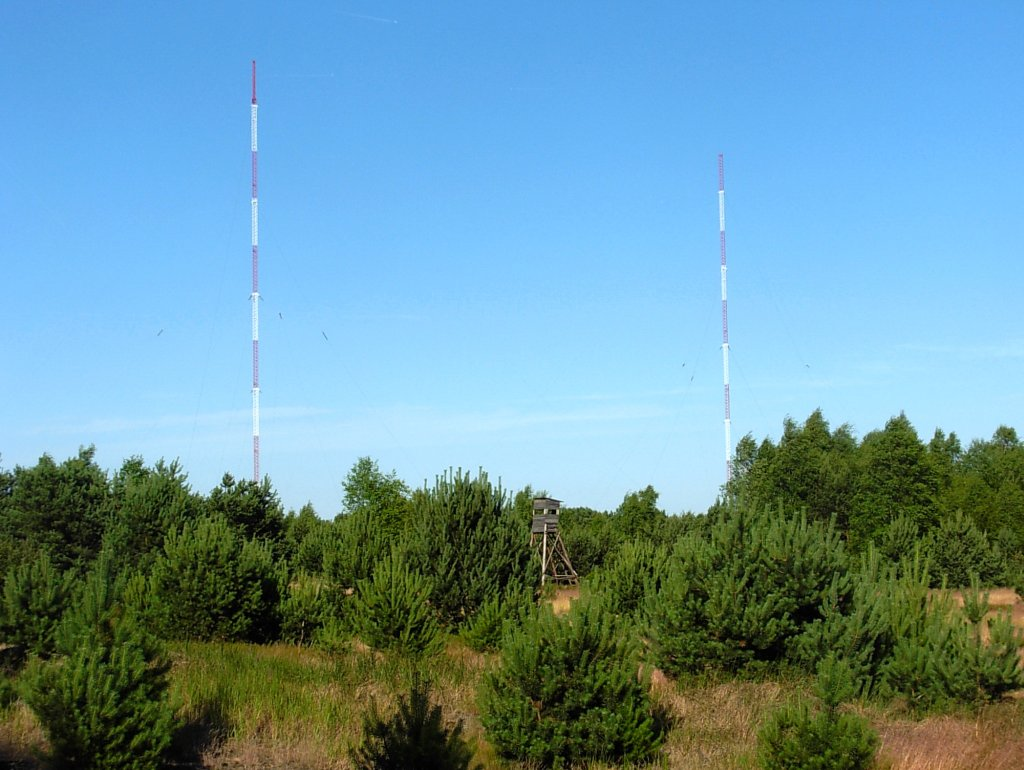
- The two masts at RCN Solec Kujawski in 2010

- Location within Poland
- Location: Solec Kujawski
- Mast height: 209 m (686 ft)
- Coordinates: 53°1′12.92″N 18°15′44.28″E
- Built: 1988-9; Official opening 3 September 1999

The Longwave transmitter Solec Kujawski (Polish: Radiowe Centrum Nadawcze w Solcu Kujawskim; RCN Solec Kujawski) is a longwave broadcasting facility of Polskie Radio on a frequency of 225 kHz frequency (wavelength of 1333m). Its construction was necessitated by the collapse of the Warsaw radio mast on 8 August 1991 and the resistance of the local population to its reconstruction. The height above sea level of the station is 67 metres (220 ft).

The station was built in 1998–99 on a former military area near Solec Kujawski. The area was originally a hamlet called Kabat (Grosswalde) until World War II, when the Germans established a military artillery and rocket training ground in the area. It has three transmitters manufactured by Thomcast, each of 400 kW, giving a combined power of 1200 kilowatts. In practice it uses 1000 kW. The carrier frequency is, as in the earlier days of the Konstantynow transmitter, generated by a set of twin high-accuracy thermally-stabilized quartz oscillators. It transmits the longwave signal of Polskie Radio Program I at 225 kHz frequency, after changing from 227 kHz in 1988. Additionally it transmits phase-modulated time signal.

It uses a directional aerial, consisting of a 330 metres (1,080 ft) high and a 289 metres (948 ft) high guyed grounded mast 330 metres apart. The taller mast is Poland's eighth highest structure.

Furthermore, there is a freestanding lattice tower close to the station building that is used for directional radio links, which serve among others for passing the program to the station.

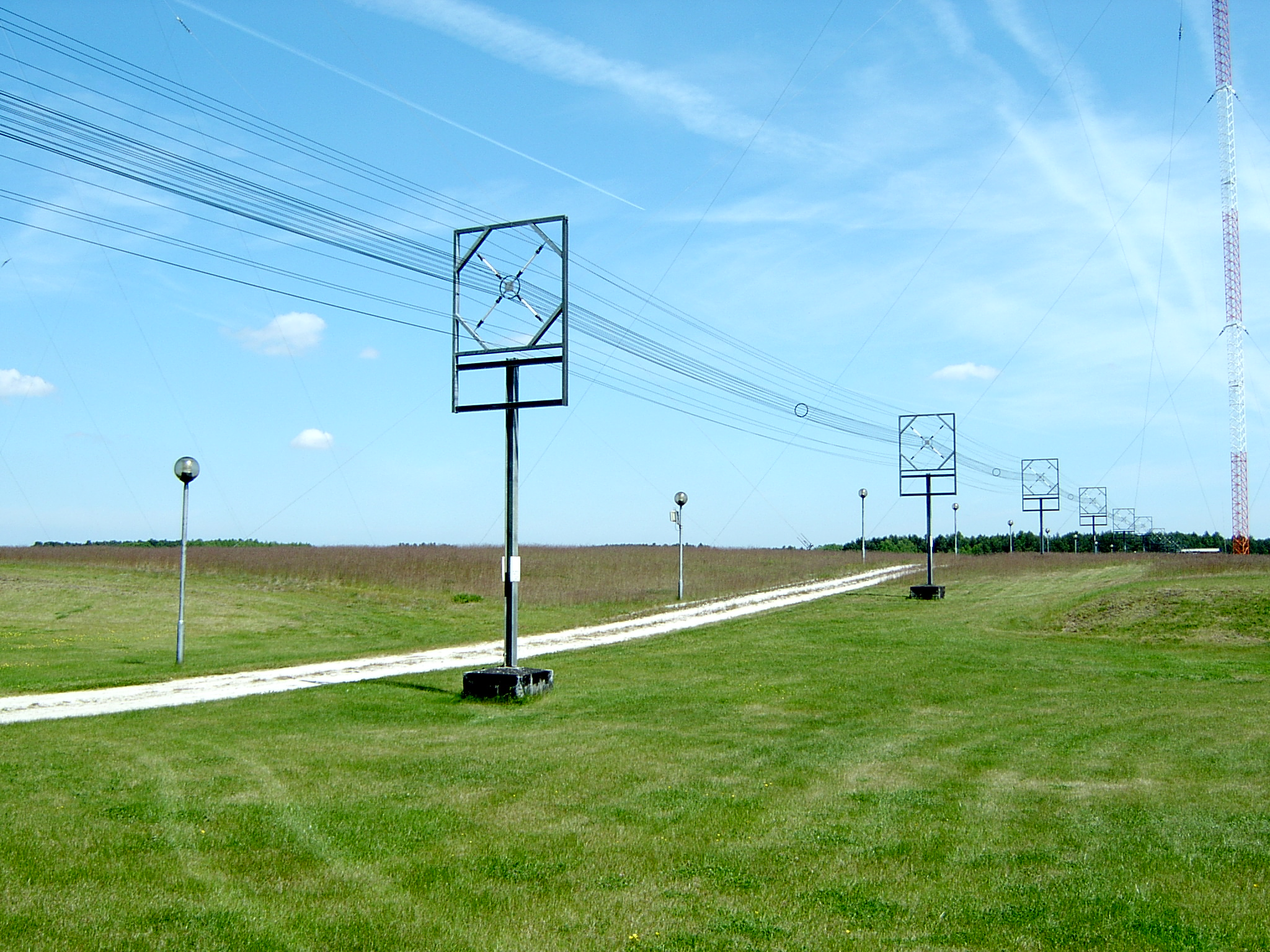
The transmission line from the transmitter to the antenna

On 16 May 2017, an engineer was electrocuted and died during maintenance work on the power supply. The transmitter therefore had to remain silent for two more days while a safety review was conducted.

== Transmitted Programmes ==
Radio (Long Wave)
Program	Frequency	Transmitted Power
Polskie Radio Program I	225 kHz	1000 kW

== See also ==
- List of masts
