= Yershovsky District =

Yershovsky District Ершовский район (Russian)
- District
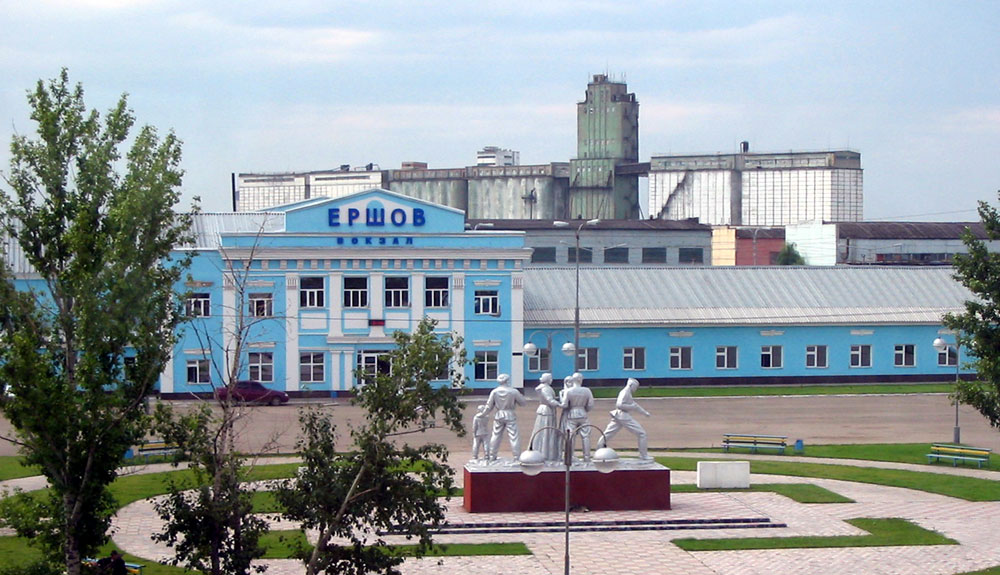
- Yershov Station, Yershovsky District

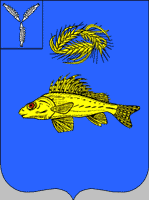
- Coat of arms
- Location of Yershovsky District in Saratov Oblast
- Coordinates: 51°21′N 48°17′E
- Country: Russia
- Federal subject: Saratov Oblast
- Established: 23 July 1928
- Administrative center: Yershov

Area
  - Total: 4,300 km^{2} (1,700 sq mi)

Population (2010 Census)
  - Total: 41,609
  - Density: 9.7/km^{2} (25/sq mi)
  - Urban: 51.5%
  - Rural: 48.5%

Administrative structure
  - Inhabited localities: 1 cities/towns, 64 rural localities

Municipal structure
  - Municipally incorporated as: Yershovsky Municipal District
  - Municipal divisions: 1 urban settlements, 13 rural settlements
- Time zone: UTC+4 (MSK+1)
- OKTMO ID: 63617000
- Website: http://ershov.sarmo.ru/

Yershovsky District (Russian: Ершовский райо́н, romanized: Yershovskiy raion) is an administrative and municipal district (raion), one of the thirty-eight in Saratov Oblast, Russia. It is located in the eastern central part of the oblast. The area of the district is 4,300 square kilometers (1,700 sq mi). Its administrative center is the town of Yershov. Population: 41,609 (2010 Census); 50,337 (2002 census); 53,333 (1989 Soviet census). The population of Yershov accounts for 51.5% of the district's total population.
