= Konstantynów, Płock County =

Konstantynów
- Village
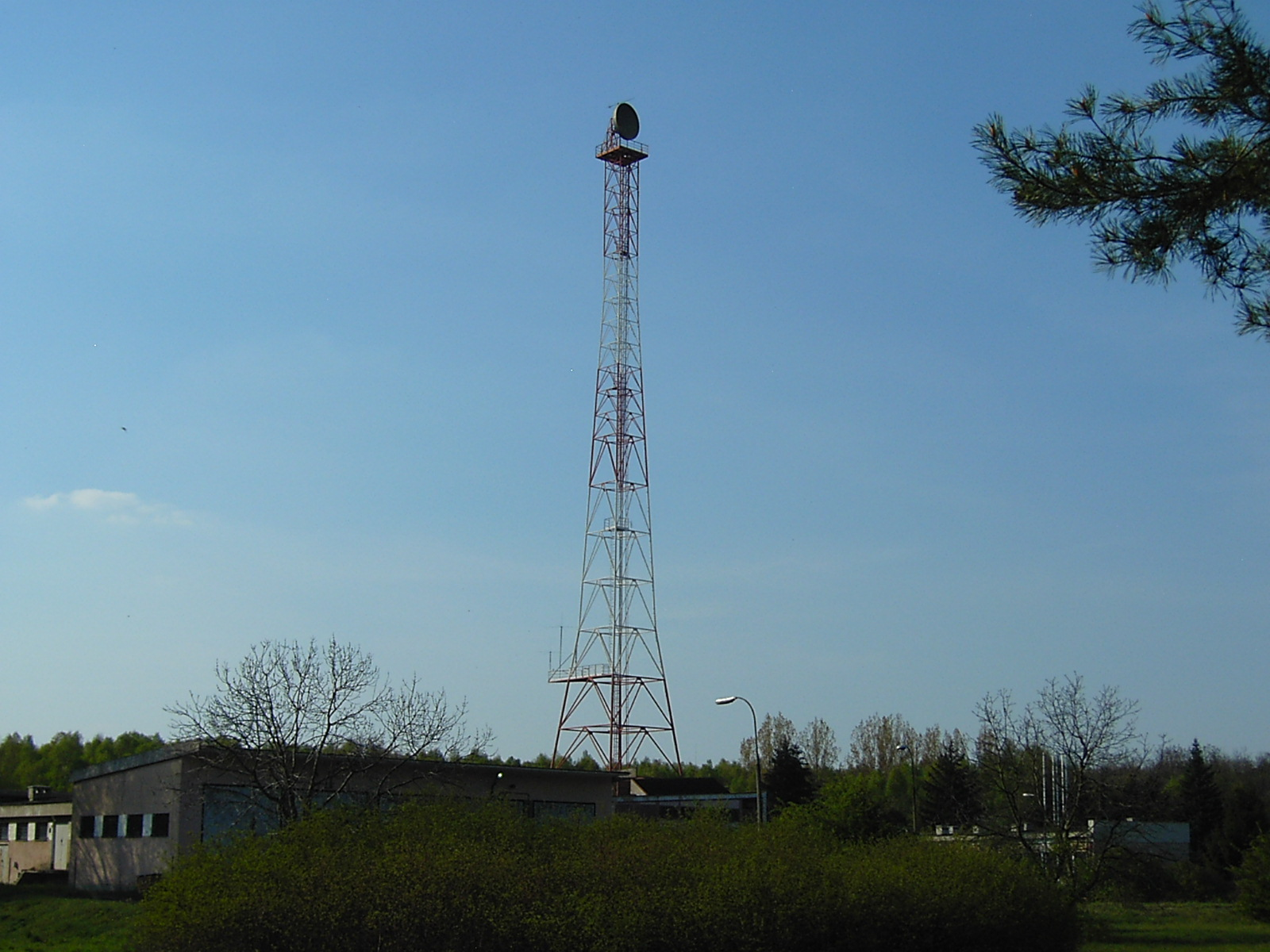
- Radio relay tower in Konstantynów

- Location within Poland
- Coordinates: 52°22′N 19°48′E
- Country: Poland
- Voivodeship: Masovian
- County: Płock
- Gmina: Gąbin
- Population: 35
- Time zone: UTC+1 (CET)
  - Summer (DST): UTC+2 (CEST)
- Vehicle registration: WPL

Konstantynów [kɔnstanˈtɨnuf] is a village in Płock County, Masovian Voivodeship, Poland with population of 38 people.

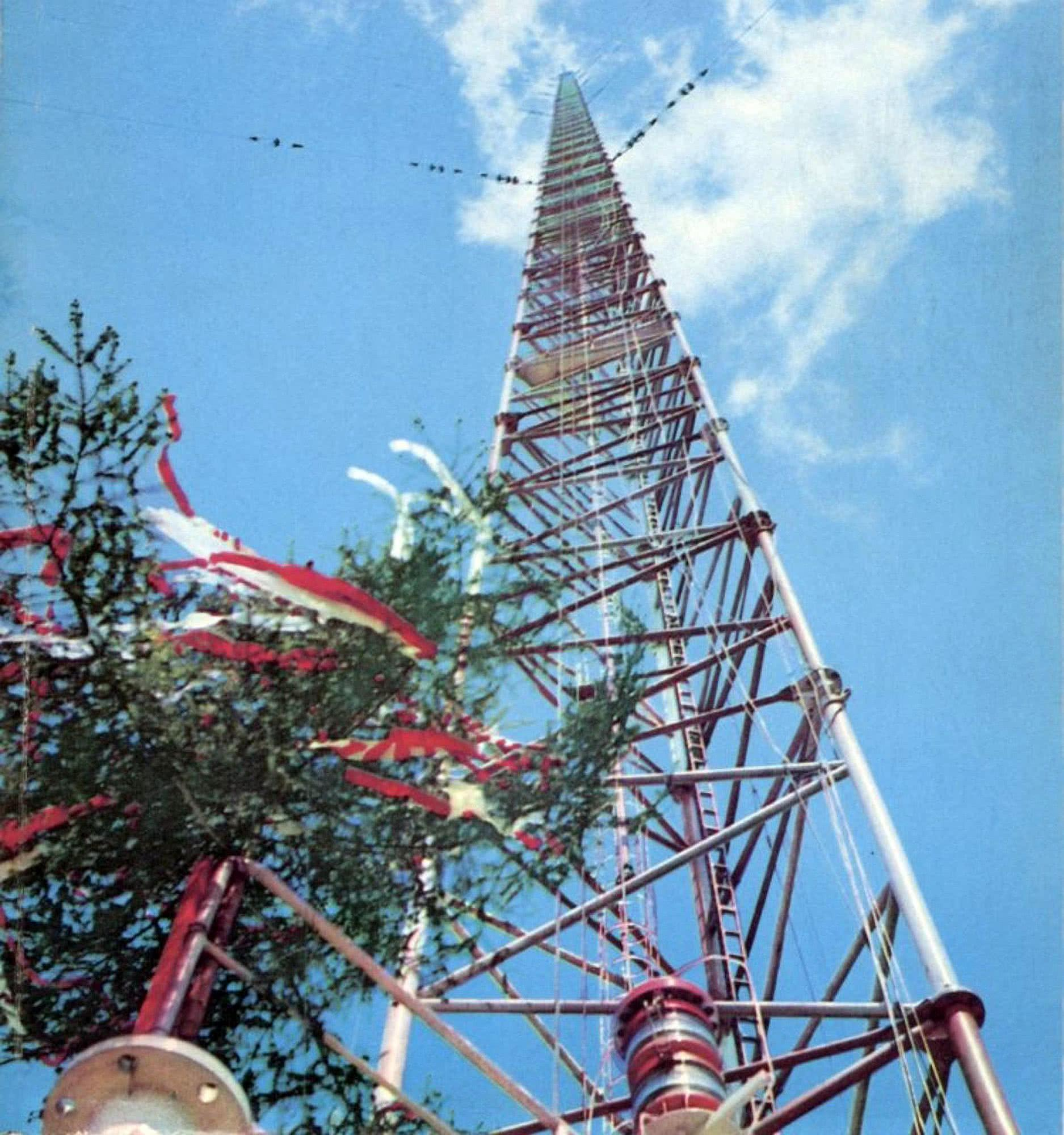
Warsaw radio mast before topping out (1974)

From 1974 to 1991 the tallest manmade structure stood here, the Warsaw radio mast, which remained the tallest structure ever built by humans until 2010, when the Burj Khalifa was finished. This mast was a 646.38-metre-high (2,120.7 ft) guyed radio mast in steel-framework construction with triangular cross section with a side length of 4.8 metres and a weight of 420 tons. The mast was used for the 2000 kilowatt long wave transmitter of the Polish broadcasting authority as aerial and was therefore insulated against ground for a voltage of 120 kilovolts. It collapsed during renovation work on August 8, 1991. Nobody was reported killed in the accident.
