= Novouzensky Uyezd =

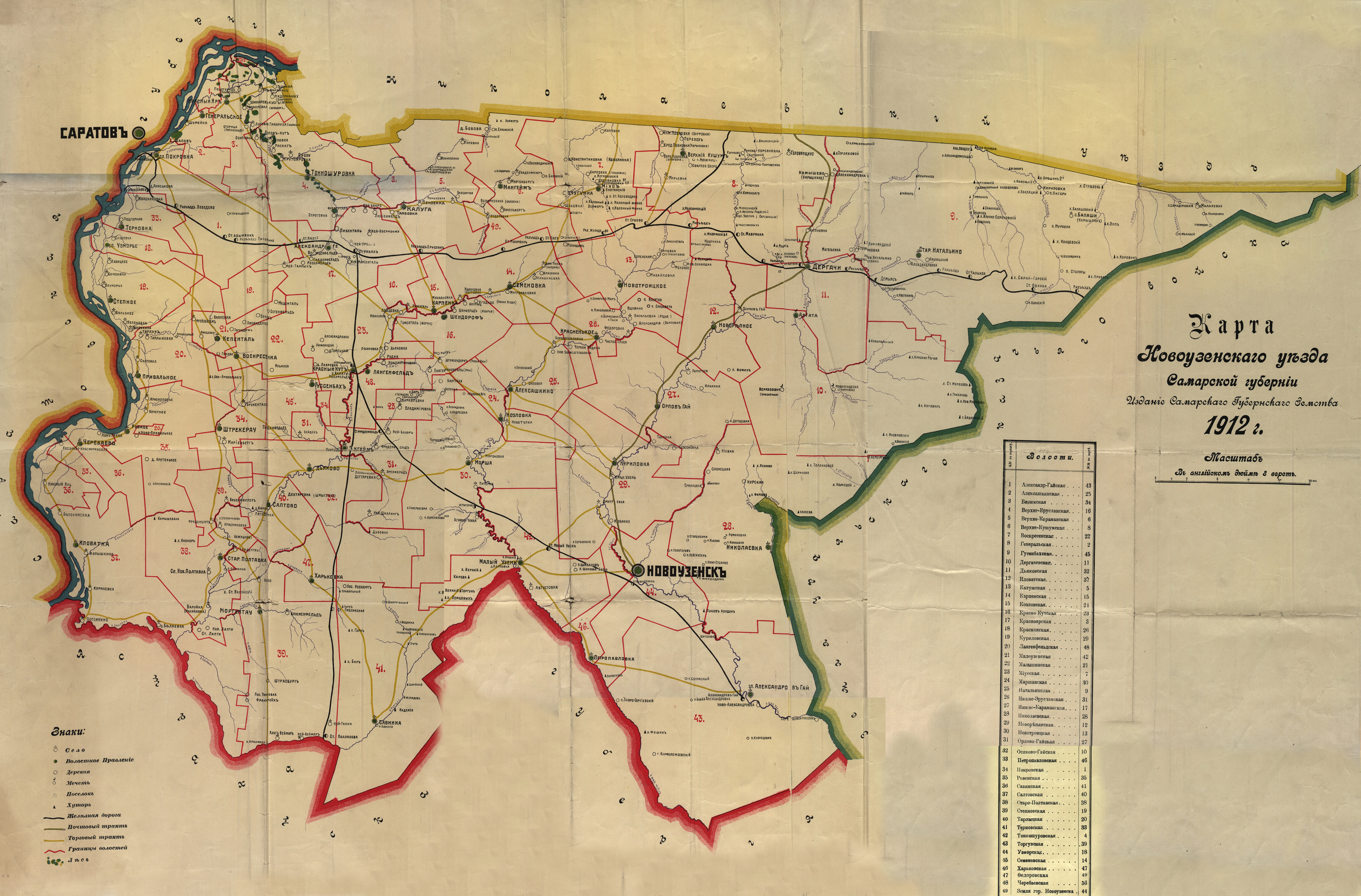
1912 map of Novouzensky Uyezd

Novouzensky Uyezd (Russian: Новоузенский уезд) was one of the subdivisions of the Samara Governorate of the Russian Empire. It was situated in the southern part of the governorate. Its administrative center was Novouzensk.

== Demographics ==
At the time of the Russian Empire Census of 1897, Novouzensky Uyezd had a population of 417,376. Of these, 39.9% spoke Russian, 36.8% German, 17.0% Ukrainian, 3.1% Tatar, 1.6% Kazakh, 0.9% Mordvin, 0.2% Estonian, 0.2% Bashkir, 0.1% Lithuanian and 0.1% Polish as their native language.
