= 2008 in Polish television =

List of years in Polish television
- … 1998; 1999; 2000; 2001; 2002; 2003; 2004; 2005; 2006; 2007; 2008; 2009; 2010; 2011; 2012; 2013; 2014; 2015; 2016; 2017; 2018 …
- Art; Archaeology; Architecture; Literature; Music; Philosophy; Science; +...

This is a list of Polish television related events from 2002.

== Events ==
- 6 April - Jarek Jakimowicz is voted winner of Big Brother VIP.
- 25 May - Pensjonat pod Różą actress Magdalena Walach and her partner Cezary Olszewski win the seventh series of Taniec z Gwiazdami.
- 1 June - Janusz Strączek wins the sixth and final series of Big Brother.
- 29 November - Male acrobatics duo Melkart Ball win the first series of Mam talent!.
- 30 November - Klan actress Agata Kulesza and her partner Stefano Terrazzino win the eighth series of Taniec z Gwiazdami.
- 5 December - Martyna Melosik wins the first series of Fabryka Gwiazd.

== Debuts ==
- 13 September - Mam talent! (2008–present)

== Television shows ==
=== 1990s ===
- Klan (1997–present)

=== 2000s ===
- M jak miłość (2000–present)
- Na Wspólnej (2003–present)
- Pierwsza miłość (2004–present)
- Dzień Dobry TVN (2005–present)
- Taniec z gwiazdami (2005-2011, 2014–present)

== Ending this year ==
- Big Brother (2001-2002, 2007-2008)

== Networks and services ==
=== Launches ===
Network	Type	Launch date	Notes	Source
TVS	Cable television	Unknown		
History	Cable television	9 April		
Polsat News	Cable television	7 June		
Nickelodeon	Cable television	10 July		
TVP HD	Cable television	6 August		
Orange Sport	Cable television	8 August		
FilmBox Family	Cable television	5 September		
Canal+ Domo	Cable television	20 September		
Canal+ Sport 5	Cable television	3 October		
Polsat Play	Cable television	6 October		

=== Conversions and rebrandings ===
Old network name	New network name	Type	Conversion Date	Notes	Source
[[]]		Cable and satellite			

=== Closures ===
Network	Type	End date	Notes	Sources
TVN Gra	Cable television	1 June		
TVN Med	Cable and satellite	31 December		

== See also ==
- 2008 in Poland
