= 2005 in Polish television =

List of years in Polish television
- … 1995; 1996; 1997; 1998; 1999; 2000; 2001; 2002; 2003; 2004; 2005; 2006; 2007; 2008; 2009; 2010; 2011; 2012; 2013; 2014; 2015 …
- Art; Archaeology; Architecture; Literature; Music; Philosophy; Science; +...

This is a list of Polish television related events from 2005.

== Events ==
- 4 June - The Co za tydzień? presenter Olivier Janiak and his partner Kamila Kajak win the first series of Taniec z Gwiazdami.
- 11 June - Maciej Silski wins the fourth and final series of Idol.
- 4 December - M jak miłość actress Katarzyna Cichopek and her partner Marcin Hakiel win the second series of Taniec z Gwiazdami.

== Debuts ==
- 16 April - Taniec z gwiazdami (2005-2011, 2014-present)
- 3 September - Dzień Dobry TVN (2005-present)

== Television shows ==
=== 1990s ===
- Klan (1997-present)

=== 2000s ===
- M jak miłość (2000-present)
- Na Wspólnej (2003-present)
- Pensjonat pod Różą (2004-2006)
- Pierwsza miłość (2004-present)

== Ending this year ==
- Idol (2002-2005)

== Networks and services ==
=== Launches ===
Network	Type	Launch date	Notes	Source
Cinemax	Cable television	23 February		
Cartoonito	Cable television	5 June		
TVN Gra	Cable television	3 October		
Polsat Sport Extra	Cable television	15 October		
Cinemax 2	Cable television	1 November		
Comedy Central Extra	Cable television	1 December		

=== Conversions and rebrandings ===
Old network name	New network name	Type	Conversion Date	Notes	Source
Fox Kids Play	Jetix Play	Cable and satellite	January		

=== Closures ===
Network	Type	End date	Notes	Sources
[[]]	Cable and satellite			
