= 2016 in Polish television =

List of years in Polish television
- … 2006; 2007; 2008; 2009; 2010; 2011; 2012; 2013; 2014; 2015; 2016; 2017; 2018; 2019; 2020; 2021; 2022; 2023; 2024; 2025; 2026 …
- Art; Archaeology; Architecture; Literature; Music; Philosophy; Science; +...

This is a list of Polish television related events from 2016.

== Events ==
- 13 May - Na dobre i na złe actress Anna Karczmarczyk and her partner Jacek Jeschke win the eighteenth series of Taniec z Gwiazdami.

== Television shows ==
=== 1990s ===
- Klan (1997–present)

=== 2000s ===
- M jak miłość (2000–present)
- Na Wspólnej (2003–present)
- Pierwsza miłość (2004–present)
- Dzień Dobry TVN (2005–present)
- Taniec z gwiazdami (2005-2011, 2014–present)
- Mam talent! (2008–present)

=== 2010s ===
- The Voice of Poland (2011–present)
- X Factor (2011–present)

== Networks and services ==
=== Launches ===
Network	Type	Launch date	Notes	Source
Eska Rock TV	Cable television	23 March		
AMC	Cable television	6 May		
Eleven Sports 3	Cable television	8 June		
Polsat Sport Fight	Cable television	1 August		
Eleven Sports 1	Cable television	2 August		
Eleven Sports 2	Cable television	22 August		
2x2	Cable television	1 September		
8TV	Cable television	28 September		
Zoom TV	Cable television	25 October		
Nowa TV	Cable television	9 November		
TBN Polska	Cable television	1 December		
e-sport	Cable television	1 December		
Metro	Cable television	2 December		
W9	Cable television	2 December		

=== Conversions and rebrandings ===
Old network name	New network name	Type	Conversion Date	Notes	Source
[[]]		Cable and satellite			

=== Closures ===
Network	Type	End date	Notes	Sources
Orange Sport	Cable and satellite	31 December		

== See also ==
- 2016 in Poland
