= 2015 in Poland =

- Decades: 1990s; 2000s; 2010s; 2020s
- See also: Other events of 2015; Timeline of Polish history

The following lists events that will happen during 2015 in Poland.

== Incumbents ==
Incumbents
Position	Person	Party	Notes
President	Bronisław Komorowski	Independent (Supported by the Civic Platform)	Until 6 August 2015
President	Andrzej Duda	Independent (Supported by Law and Justice)	From 6 August 2015
Prime Minister	Ewa Kopacz	Civic Platform	Until 16 November 2015
Prime Minister	Beata Szydło	Law and Justice	From 16 November 2015
Marshal of the Sejm	Radosław Sikorski	Civic Platform	Until 23 June 2015
Marshal of the Sejm	Jerzy Wenderlich	Democratic Left Alliance	23 June 2015 - 25 June 2015 (Acting)
Marshal of the Sejm	Małgorzata Kidawa-Błońska	Civic Platform	25 June 2015 - 11 November 2015
Marshal of the Sejm	Marek Kuchciński	Law and Justice	From 12 November 2015
Marshal of the Senate	Bogdan Borusewicz	Independent (Supported by the Civic Platform)	Until 11 November 2015
Marshal of the Senate	Stanisław Karczewski	Law and Justice	From 12 November 2015

=== Elections ===
2015 Polish presidential election
Candidate	Party	First round		Second round	
Candidate	Party	Votes	%	Votes	%
**Andrzej Duda**	**Law and Justice**	**5,179,092**	**34.76**	**8,630,627**	**51.55**
Bronisław Komorowski	Independent (endorsed by Civic Platform)	5,031,060	33.77	8,112,311	48.45
Paweł Kukiz	Independent	3,099,079	20.80		
Janusz Korwin-Mikke	KORWiN	486,084	3.26		
Magdalena Ogórek	Independent	353,883	2.38		
Adam Jarubas	Polish People's Party	238,761	1.60		
Janusz Palikot	Your Movement	211,242	1.42		
Grzegorz Braun	Independent	124,132	0.83		
Marian Kowalski	National Movement	77,630	0.52		
Jacek Wilk	Congress of the New Right	68,186	0.46		
Paweł Tanajno	Direct Democracy	29,785	0.20		
Invalid/blank votes		124,952	–	250,231	–
**Total**		**15,023,886**	**100**	**16,993,169**	**100**
Registered voters/turnout		30,688,570	48.96	30,709,281	55.34
Source: PKW, PKW

Bold indicates government parties.

2015 Polish parliamentary election
Party		Leader	Sejm			Senate
English	Polish	Leader	Seats	Popular vote	Percentage	Seats
Law and Justice	**Prawo i Sprawiedliwość**	**Jarosław Kaczyński**	235 / 460	**5,711,687**	**37.58%**	61 / 100
Civic Platform	Platforma Obywatelska	Ewa Kopacz	138 / 460	3,661,474	24.09%	34 / 100
Kukiz'15	Kukiz'15	Paweł Kukiz	42 / 460	1,339,094	8.81%	0 / 100
Modern	Nowoczesna Ryszarda Petru, Nowoczesna	Ryszard Petru	28 / 460	1,155,370	7.60%	0 / 100
United Left	Zjednoczona Lewica	Barbara Nowacka	0 / 460	1,147,102	7.60%	0 / 100
Polish People's Party	Polskie Stronnictwo Ludowe	Janusz Piechociński	16 / 460	779,875	5.13%	1 / 100
Coalition for the Renewal of the Republic - Liberty and Hope	Koalicja Odnowy Rzeczypospolitej Wolność i Nadzieja	Janusz Korwin-Mikke	0 / 460	722,999	4.76%	0 / 100
Together	Razem	Collective leadership	0 / 460	550,349	3.62%	0 / 100
German Minority	Mniejszość Niemiecka		1 / 460	28,014	0.2%	0 / 100
Independents	Niezależni	N/A				4 / 100
Other			0 / 460	128,780 (Total)	0.85% (Total)	0 / 100
Total and turnout			460	15,200,671	50.92%	100

== Events ==
=== January ===
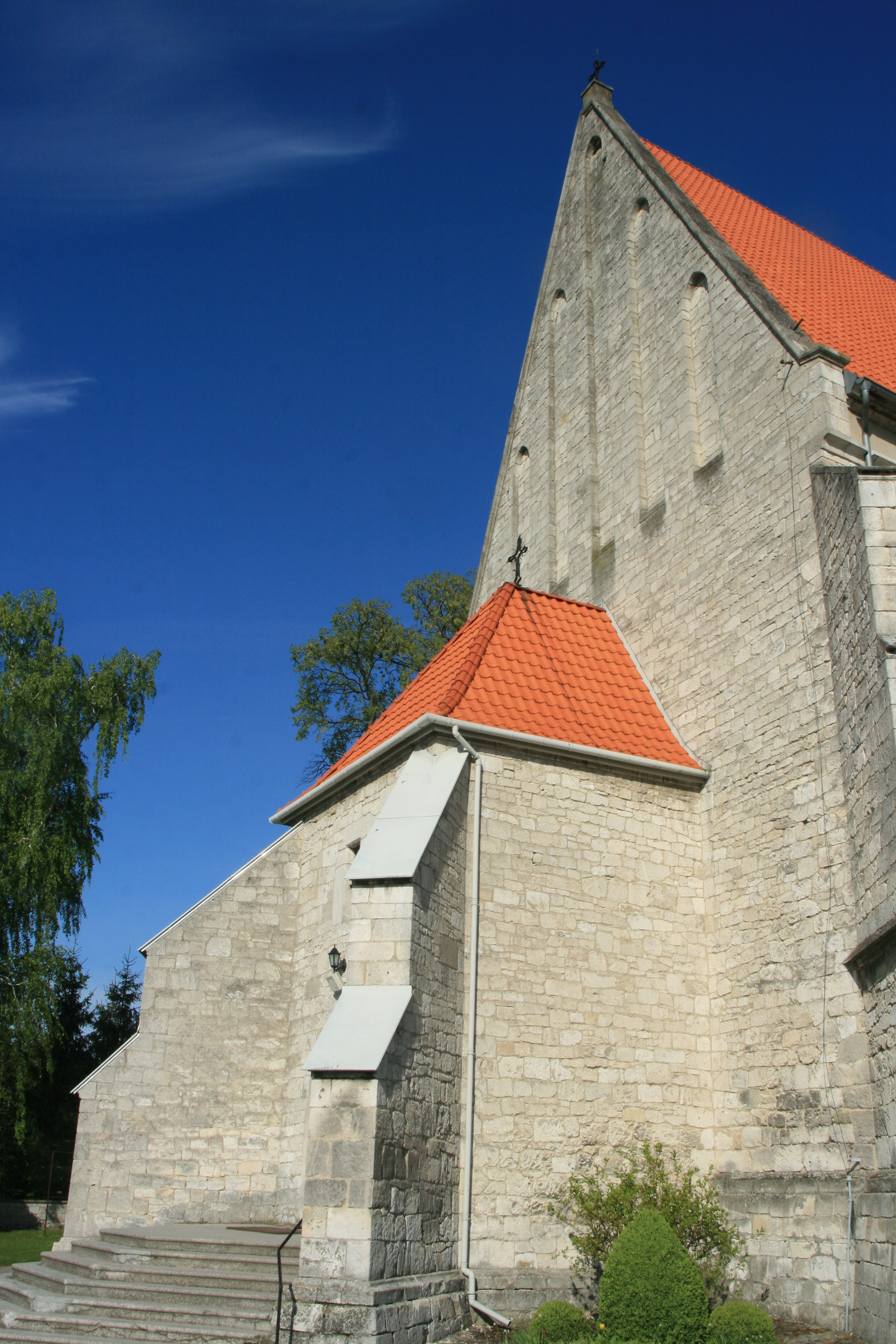
Medieval Gothic church in Stopnica in 2014

- 1 January
  - Chocz (Greater Poland Voivodeship) and Stopnica (Holy Cross Voivodeship) received town rights.
  - Zielona Góra was enlarged by the area of Zielona Góra Gmina, hence becoming the sixth largest city by area in Poland.
- 11 January – The twenty third final of the Great Orchestra of Christmas Charity took place.
- 8–18 January – Coal miners held a protest in Upper Silesia.
- 28 January – the Vilnius People's Rupublic internet hoax was initiated.

=== February ===
- 4 February – Radosław Sikorski, Sejm Marshal, set the date of the presidential election to 10 May.
- 5 February – The incumbent President, Bronisław Komorowski announced his willingness to be reelected in the upcoming election.

=== March ===
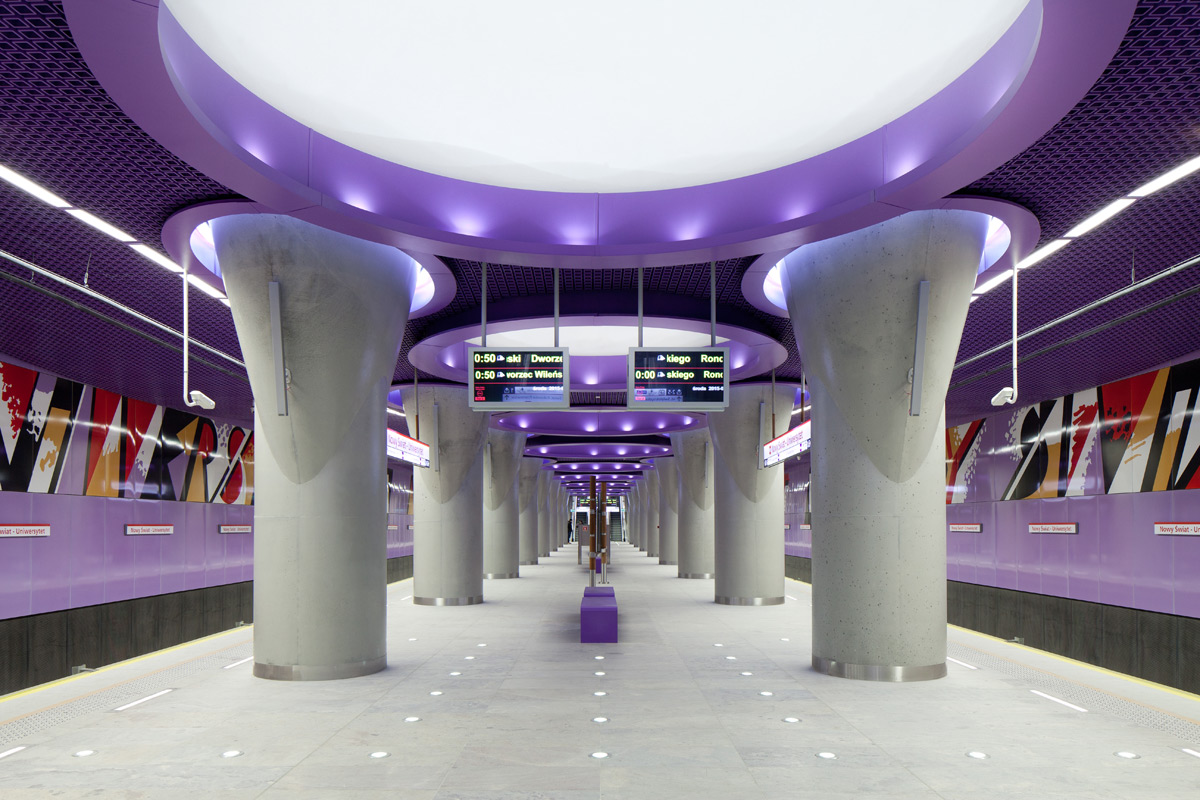
Nowy Świat-Uniwersytet metro station in 2015

- 8 March – The first segment of the second line of the Warsaw Metro was opened.

=== April ===
- 6–12 April – The 2015 Katowice Open was held in Katowice, Silesian Voivodeship.
- 28 April – Resovia won their seventh Polish Volleyball Championship defeating Trefl Gdańsk in the finals (see 2014–15 PlusLiga).

=== May ===
- 2 May – 2015 Knurów riots
- 10 May – The first round of the 2015 Polish presidential election was held. No candidate received more than half of the vote, so Bronisław Komorowski and Andrzej Duda went into the second round.
- 21 May – Vive Kielce won their twelfth Polish Handball Championship, defeating Wisła Płock in the finals.
- 24 May – The second round of the Polish presidential election, 2015 was held. Andrzej Duda, Law and Justice party candidate won the election over incumbent Bronisław Komorowski, receiving 51.55% of the vote.
- 29 May – A tragic accident of a gyroplane occurred near Brzeg Dolny.

=== June ===
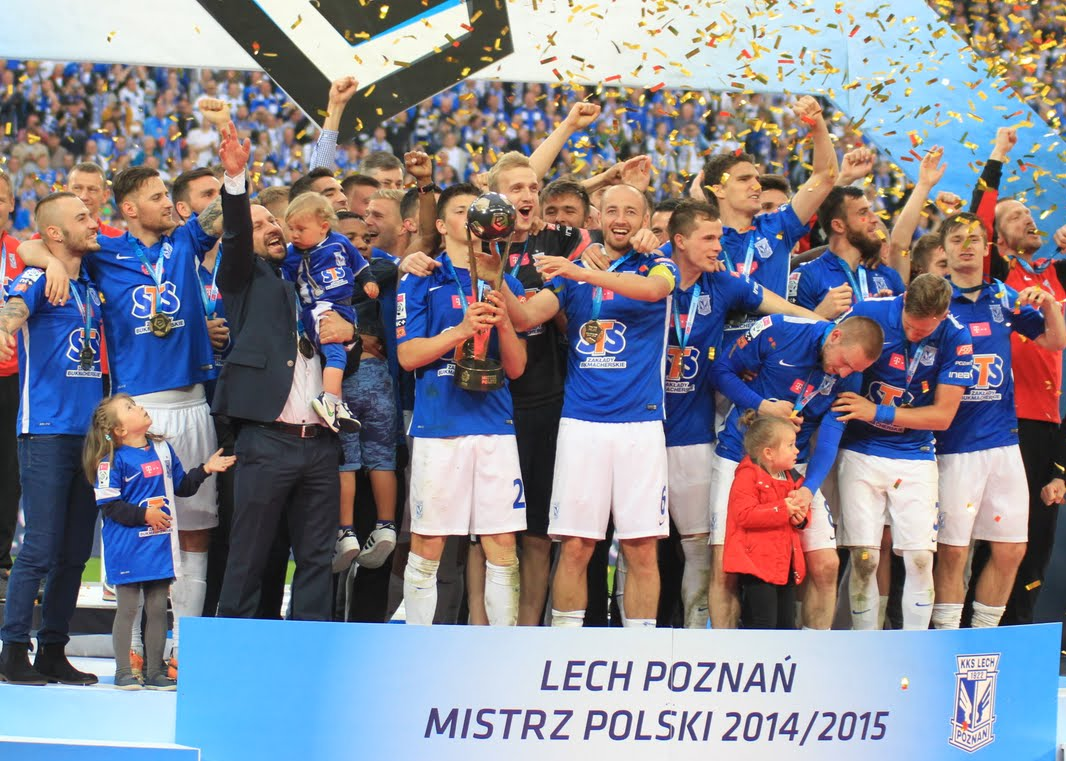
Lech Poznań players celebrate winning the Polish 2014–15 Polish Football Championship

- 7 June – Lech Poznań won their seventh Polish Football Championship (see 2014–15 Ekstraklasa).
- 8 June – A whirlwind occurred in the South of Poland.
- 9 June – Stelmet Zielona Góra won their second Polish Basketball Championship defeating Turów Zgorzelec in the finals (see 2014–15 PLK season).

=== July ===
- 19 July – Powerful and violent storms with heavy rainfall occurred, resulting in the death of one person and the injury of fourteen others.
- 23 July – Irena Doroszkiewicz, as the first woman in history, was appointed Superintendent of the Police.

=== September ===
- 6 September – A referendum is held, in which voters decided on introducing single-member constituencies for Sejm elections, maintaining state financing of political parties and introducing a presumption in favour of the taxpayer in disputes over the tax law.
- 27 September – Unia Leszno won their 14th Team Speedway Polish Championship defeating Sparta Wrocław in the finals (see 2015 Polish speedway season).

=== October ===
- 25 October – The 2015 Polish parliamentary election is held, to elect 460 MPs and 100 senators.

=== November ===
- 4 November – During a meeting with President of Romania Klaus Iohannis, Duda and Iohannis establish Bucharest Nine.

== Deaths ==
=== January ===
- 1 January – Józef Hałas, Polish painter and engraver (b. 1927)
- 4 January – Edmund Wnuk-Lipiński, Polish sociologist (b. 1944)
- 7 January – Tadeusz Konwicki, Polish writer, screenwriter and film director (b. 1926)
- 9 January – Józef Oleksy, Polish politician, Sejm Marshal, 7th Prime Minister of Poland from 1995 to 1996 (b. 1946)
- 12 January – Marcin Pawlak, Polish local government politician (b. 1950)
- 29 January – Jan Skrzek, Polish musician and blues composer (b. 1953)
- 30 January – Zbigniew Kurtycz, Polish musician (b. 1919)

=== February ===
- 4 February – Karol Parno Gierliński, Polish gypsy sculptor, poet (b. 1938)
- 9 February – Piotr Winczorek, Polish professor, lawyer, member of the State Tribunal (b. 1943)
- 11 February – Sylwester Przedwojewski, Polish actor (b. 1920)
- 12 February – Jerzy Regulski, Polish economist, politician (b. 1924)
- 17 February – Andrzej Kot, Polish designer, calligrapher, typesetter, typographer, book illustrator
- 25 February –
  - Adam Halber, Polish journalist, politician (b. 1948)
  - Zbigniew Kalemba, Polish composer, pianist, conductor, teacher (b. 1936)
  - Marian Szeja, Polish soccer player, gold medallist at the 1972 Summer Olympics in Munich, Germany (b. 1941)
- 27 February – Bohdan Tomaszewski, Polish journalist and sports commentator, tennis player (b. 1921)

=== March ===
- 6 March – Janusz Kałużny, Polish astronomist (b. 1955)
- 10 March – Agnieszka Kotlarska (actress), Polish actor (b. 1971)

=== April ===
- 1 April – Robert Leszczyński, Polish journalist, music critic, guitarist (b. 1967)
- 2 April – Barbara Sass, Polish film director (b. 1936)
- 21 April – Jan Matyjaszkiewicz, Polish actor (b. 1929)
- 24 April – Władysław Bartoszewski, former Minister of Foreign Affairs and Auschwitz survivor (b. 1922)

=== May ===
- 3 May – Halina Dunajska, Polish actor (b. 1926)
- 6 May – Włodzimierz Wilkosz, Polish actor (b. 1928)
- 7 May – Fr. Józef Pazdur, Roman Catholic prelate, Bishop of Wrocław (1984-2000) (b. 1924)
- 20 May – Jan Prochyra, Polish actor (b. 1948)

=== June ===
- 1 June – Tadeusz Zawistowski, Polish Catholic priest, suffragan bishop of Łomża (b. 1930)
- 4 June – Bolesław Idziak, Polish actor (b. 1928)

=== July ===
- 3 July – Krystyna Siesicka, Polish writer (b. 1928)
- 8 July – Waldemar Ochnia, Polish cabaret artist (b. 1952)
- 9 July – Tadeusz Suchocki, Polish pianist, composer, arranger (b. 1927)
- 28 July – David Faber, Polish-American author and academic (b. 1928)

== See also ==
- 2015 in Polish television
