= Grabarczyk =

Grabarczyk (Polish pronunciation: [ɡraˈbart͡ʂɨk]) is a Polish surname, and may refer to:

- Andrzej Grabarczyk (born 1953), Polish actor
- Andrzej Grabarczyk (born 1964), Polish athlete
- Cezary Grabarczyk (born 1960), Polish politician
- Mirosław Grabarczyk (born 1971), Polish chess master
- Piotr Grabarczyk (born 1982), Polish handball player
