= Andrzej Grabarczyk =

Andrzej Grabarczyk may refer to:

- Andrzej Grabarczyk (actor) (born 1953), Polish actor
- Andrzej Grabarczyk (athlete) (1964–2016), Polish athlete
