= 1994 in television =

1994 in television may refer to:

- 1994 in American television for television-related events in the United States.
- 1994 in Australian television for television-related events in Australia.
- 1994 in Belgian television for television-related events in Belgium.
- 1994 in Brazilian television for television-related events in Brazil.
- 1994 in British television for television-related events in the United Kingdom.
  - 1994 in Scottish television for television-related events in Scotland.
- 1994 in Canadian television for television-related events in Canada.
- 1994 in Croatian television for television-related events in Croatia.
- 1994 in Danish television for television-related events in Denmark.
- 1994 in Dutch television for television-related events in the Netherlands.
- 1994 in Estonian television for television-related events in Estonia.
- 1994 in Irish television for television-related events in the Republic of Ireland.
- 1994 in Italian television for television-related events in Italy.
- 1994 in Japanese television for television-related events in Japan.
- 1994 in Philippine television for television-related events in the Philippines.
- 1994 in Polish television for television-related events in Poland.
- 1994 in Portuguese television for television-related events in Portugal.
- 1994 in Spanish television for television-related events in Spain.
- 1994 in Swedish television for television-related events in Sweden.

== Television debuts ==
- C. Martin Croker – Space Ghost Coast to Coast
- George Lowe – Space Ghost Coast to Coast
- Matt Maiellaro – Space Ghost Coast to Coast
- Andy Merrill – Space Ghost Coast to Coast
