= 2011 in Poland =

- Decades: 1990s; 2000s; 2010s; 2020s
- See also: Other events of 2011; Timeline of Polish history

Events during the year 2011 in Poland.

== Incumbents ==
Incumbents
Position	Person	Party	Notes
President	Bronisław Komorowski	Independent (Supported by the Civic Platform)	
Prime Minister	Donald Tusk	Civic Platform	
Marshal of the Sejm	Grzegorz Schetyna	Civic Platform	Until 8 November 2011
Marshal of the Sejm	Ewa Kopacz	Civic Platform	From 8 November 2011
Marshal of the Senate	Bogdan Borusewicz	Independent (Supported by the Civic Platform)	

=== Elections ===
Bold indicates government parties.

2011 Polish parliamentary election
Party	Leader	Sejm			Senate
Party	Leader	Seats	Popular vote	Percentage	Seats
Civic Platform	**Donald Tusk**	207 / 460	**5,629,773**	**39.18%**	63 / 100
Law and Justice	Jarosław Kaczyński	157 / 460	4,295,016	29.89%	31 / 100
Palikot's Movement	Janusz Palikot	40 / 460	1,439,490	10.02%	0 / 100
Polish People's Party	**Waldemar Pawlak**	28 / 460	**1,201,628**	**8.36%**	2 / 100
Democratic Left Alliance	Grzegorz Napieralski	27 / 460	1,184,303	8.24%	0 / 100
German Minority		1 / 460	28,014	0.2%	0 / 100
Independents		N/A			4 / 100
Other	PJN, KNP, PPP, Prawica, NDP	0 / 460	591,279 (Total)	4.09% (Total)	0 / 100
Total and turnout		460	14,369,503	48.92%	100

== Events ==
=== January ===
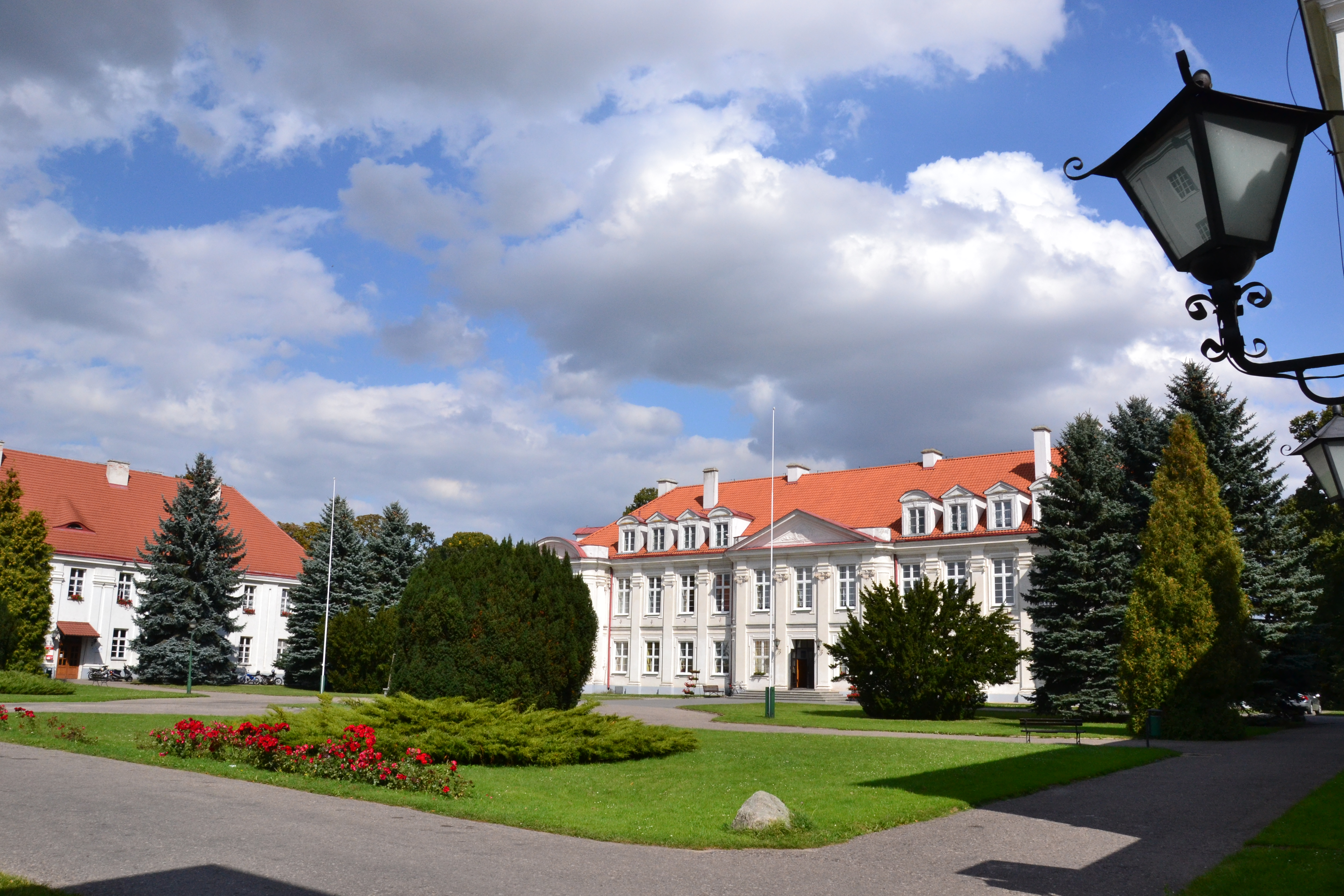
Baroque palace and park ensemble in Wolbórz in 2011

- 1 January – Five localities received town rights: Czyżew, Gościno, Nowe Brzesko, Pruchnik, and Wolbórz. For four it was a restoration of a previously lost town status.
- 9 January – The nineteenth finale of the Great Orchestra of Christmas Charity.
- 10 January – A test HD version of TVP1 is launched, named TVP1 HD.
- 31 January – President of Poland Bronislaw Komorowski signed a law introducing a 35 percent quota for electoral lists.

=== February ===
- 7 February – Warsaw summit of the Weimar Triangle.
- 19 February – Performance by the famous DJ Armin van Buuren in Poznań.
- 25 February – Abolition of the Property Commission of the Catholic Church.

=== March ===
- 1 March – The first time Poland celebrated a new national holiday: National Day of Remembrance "Soldiers accursed".
- 25 March – The Polish Sejm adopted a government proposal declining pension contributions transferred to open pension funds.

=== April ===
- 1 April – Start of the Polish Census 2011.
- 21 April – Skra Bełchatów won their seventh Polish Volleyball Championship defeating ZAKSA Kędzierzyn-Koźle in the finals (see 2010–11 PlusLiga).
- 29 April – The court annulled the Wałbrzych presidential election.

=== May ===
- 17 May – Sejm investigative committee for Christopher Olewnik adopted a report on its work.
- 23 May – Asseco Prokom Gdynia won their eighth Polish Basketball Championship defeating Turów Zgorzelec in the finals (see 2010–11 PLK season).

=== June ===
- 5 June – Rebranding of phone company Era to T-Mobile Poland.

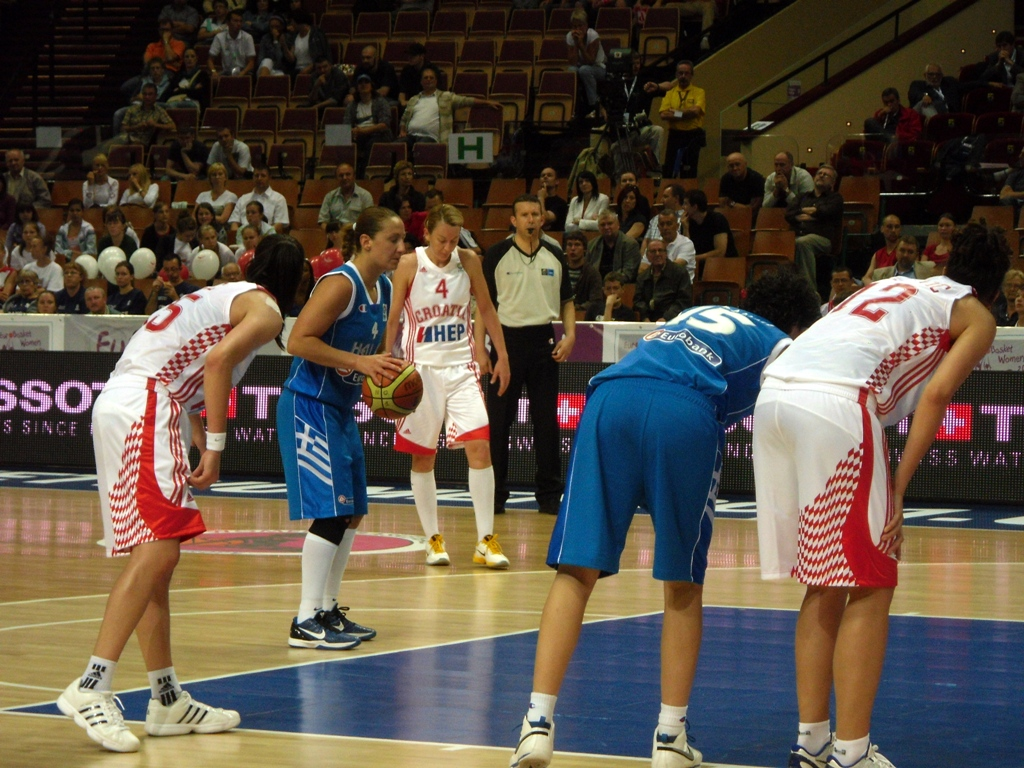
Croatia v Greece match in the EuroBasket Women 2011 in Katowice, 19 June 2011

- 18 June–3 July – Poland hosts the EuroBasket Women 2011.
- 28 June – Łukasz Kamiński sworn in as president of the Institute of National Remembrance.

=== July ===
- 1 July – Poland takes over the Presidency of the Council of the European Union from Hungary for a six-month term.
- 29 July – Committee for Investigation of National Aviation Accidents of the Polish Civil Aviation Authority announced a report on the causes of the Smolensk catastrophe on 10 April 2010.

=== August ===
- 1 August – "The Law of 5 January 2011 - Election Code" comes into force.
- 4 August – The Polish President, Bronisław Komorowski, officially announces the Parliamentary election date, set for 5 October 2011.
- 12 August – Four people have been killed and 30 people injured after a train derailed between Warsaw and Katowice in Poland.
- 18 August – The Gdynia District Court acquitted Adam Darski, the leader of death metal band Behemoth, accused of insulting religious feelings.

=== September ===
- 3 September – Opening of the Polish National Stadium (Earlier called: Stadium of the Decade)
- 8–9 September – Tenth Jubilee International Ignatius Reimann Festival in Krosnowice.

=== October ===
- 2 October – Falubaz Zielona Góra won their sixth Team Speedway Polish Championship defeating Unia Leszno in the finals (see 2011 Polish speedway season).
- 9 October – Polish Parliamentary Elections, 2011.

=== Unknown date ===
A Liquefied natural gas (LNG) plant was set up in Swinoujscie.

== Deaths ==
=== January ===
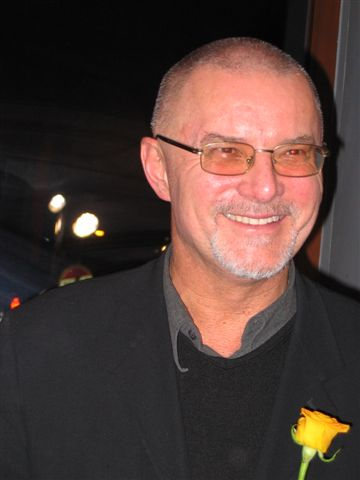
Krzysztof Kolberger

- 2 January – Cezary Kuleszyński, hurdler. (b. 1937)
- 7 January:
  - Krzysztof Kolberger, Polish actor. (b. 1950)
  - Włodzimierz Ławniczak, Polish journalist (b. 1959)
- 9 January – Jerzy Woźniak, Polish soccer player, Polish representative (b. 1932)
- 14 January – Zdzisław Szczotkowski, Polish lector (b. 1945)
- 23 January – Tomasz Wełnicki, Polish journalist, politician (b. 1957)
- 24 January – Włodzimierz Kłopocki, Polish actor (b. 1934)
- 25 January – Andrzej Szypulski, Polish screenwriter and novelist (b. 1936)
- 27 January – Jan Baszkiewicz, Polish lawyer, historian, political scientist (b. 1930)

=== February ===
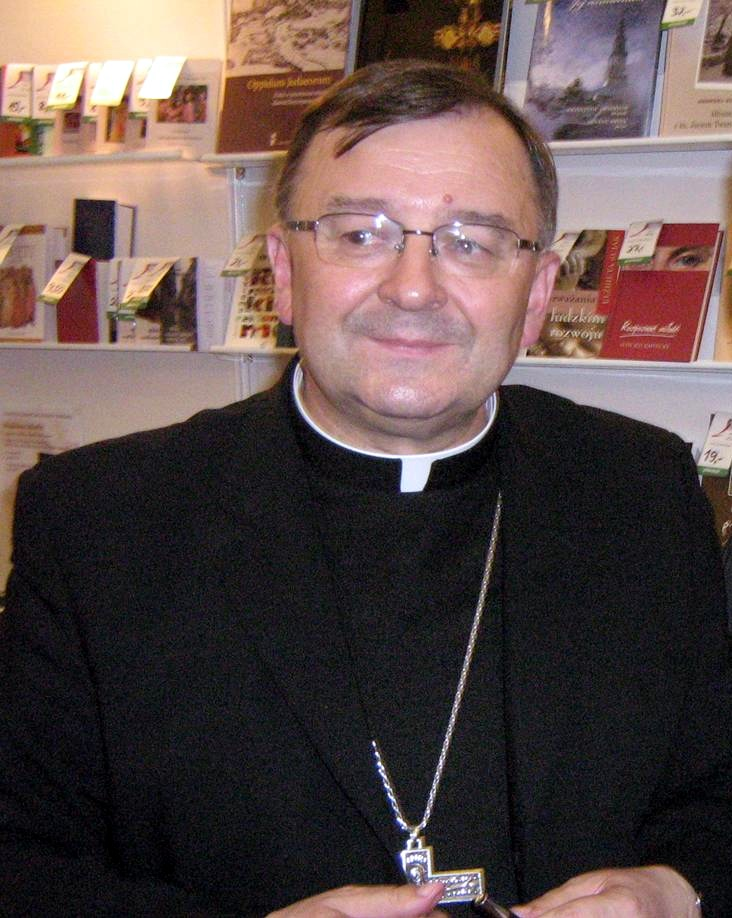
Józef Życiński

- 1 February – Stanisław Michalski, Polish actor (b. 1932)
- 4 February – Janusz Pezda, Polish politician and governor of Jelenia Góra (b. 1943)
- 6 February:
  - Jerzy Banaśkiewicz – Polish Catholic cleric, poet (b. 1937)
  - Magdalena Tesławska – Polish film and theatre costume designer (b. 1945)
- 9 February:
  - Andrzej Przybielski, Polish jazz trumpeter (b. 1944)
  - Janusz Maciejewski, Polish philologist, literary critic (b. 1930)
- 10 February:
  - Józef Życiński, Polish Catholic cleric, Archbishop of Lublin (b. 1948)
  - Antoni Halor, Polish film and theatre director, artist literary (b. 1937)
- 15 February:
  - Sławomir Radoń, Polish historian, General Director of State Archives (b. 1957)
  - Karin Stanek, Polish singer, lead singer of the band Czerwono-Czarni (b. 1946)
- 21 February – Jerzy Nowosielski, Polish painter, illustrator, set designer (b. 1923)

=== March ===
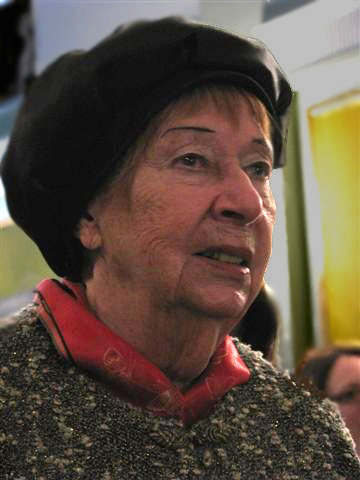
Irena Kwiatkowska

- 3 March – Irena Kwiatkowska, Polish actor (b. 1912)
- 4 March – Lucyna Legut, Polish actor (b. 1926)
- 19 March – Anna Kajtochowa, Polish writer, novelist, journalist (b. 1928)
- 23 March – Antoni Jurasz, Polish actor (b. 1922)
- 26 March:
  - Roman Piętka, Polish priest, Archimandrite (b. 1937)
  - Paul Baran, American computer scientist of Polish descent (b. 1926)

=== April ===
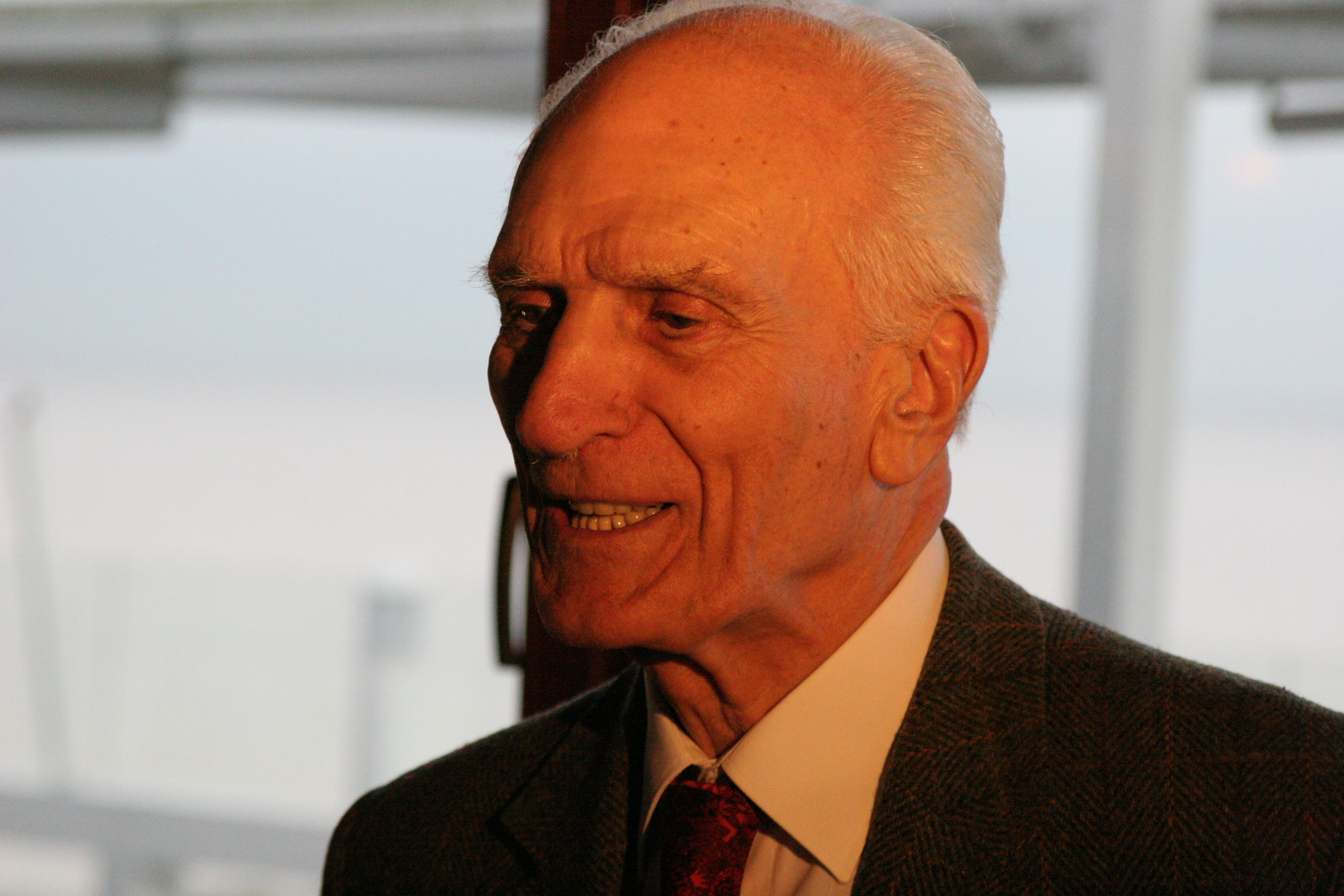
Marian Pankowski

- 3 April:
  - Marian Pankowski, Polish writer (b. 1919)
  - Andrzej Butruk, Polish actor, lector, satirist (b. 1964)
- 16 April:
  - Henryk Zomerski, Polish bass guitarist (b. 1942)
  - Tadeusz Pawlusiak, Polish ski jumper (b. 1946)
- 18 April – Andrzej Piszczatowski, Polish actor (b. 1945)
- 20 April – Halina Skibniewska, Polish architect, politician, Deputy Speaker of the Sejm (b. 1921)
- 25 April – Ryszard Nawrocki, Polish actor (b. 1940)
- 27 April – Zdzisław Rutecki, Polish speedway, speedway sports coach (b. 1960)
- 29 April – Waldemar Baszanowski, Polish weightlifter, World and European champion, Olympic champion (b. 1935)

=== May ===
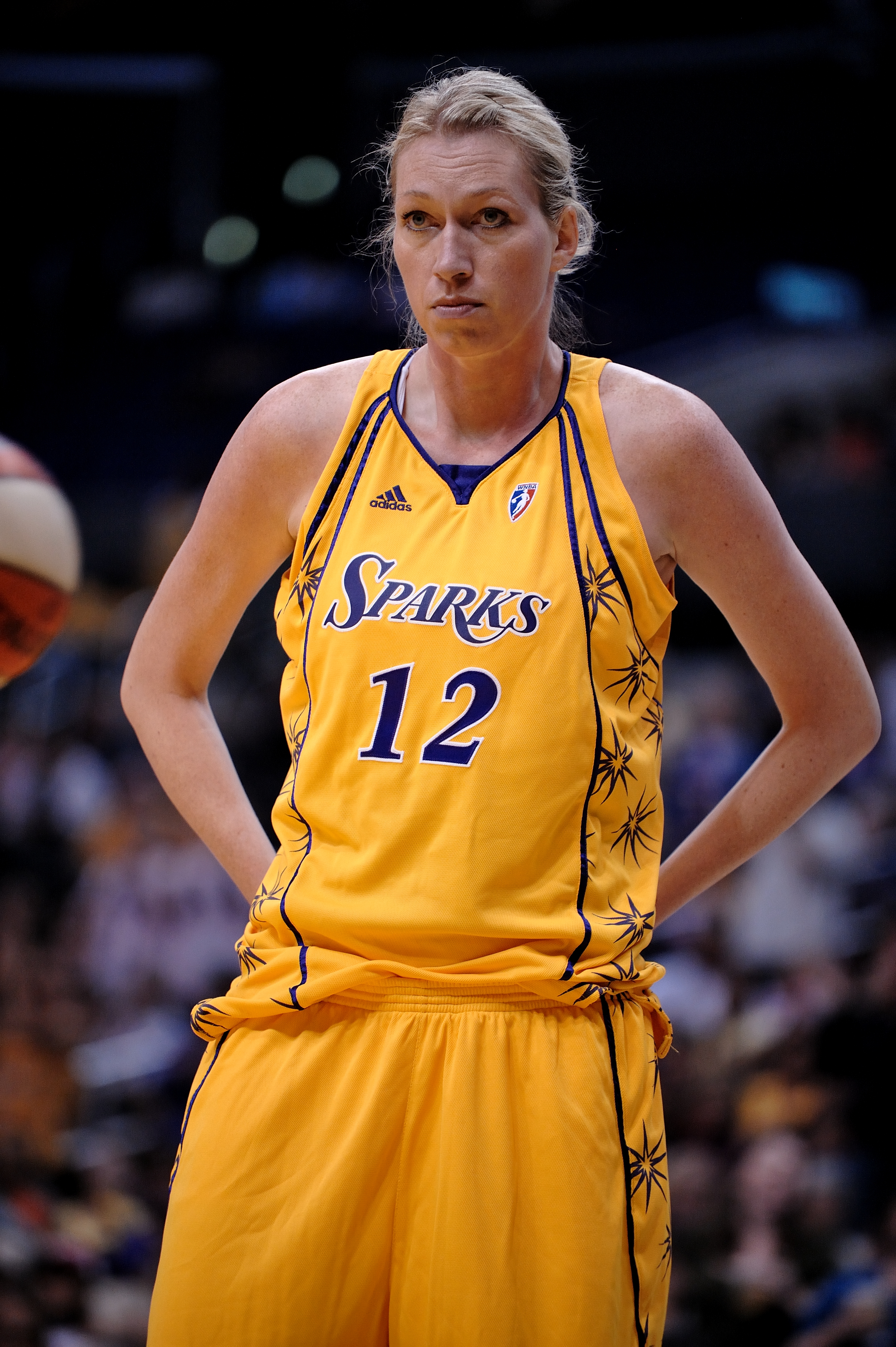
Małgorzata Dydek

- 12 May – Piotr Żyżelewicz, Polish drummer, member of the teams: Armia, Izrael, Voo Voo and 2Tm2, 3 (b. 1965)
- 15 May – Krystyna Dmochowska, Polish actor (b. 1956)
- 17 May – Ewa Szumańska, Polish writer, reporter, satirist (b. 1921)
- 18 May – Włada Majewska, Polish radio journalist, actress, singer (b. 1911)
- 25 May:
  - Edward Żentara, Polish actor (b. 1956)
  - Marek Nawara, Polish politician (b. 1956)
- 27 May:
  - Małgorzata Dydek, Polish basketball player (b. 1974)
  - Jacek Puchała, Polish surgeon (b. 1956)
- 29 May – Krystyna Skuszanka, Polish theatre director and principal of theatres (b. 1924)

=== June ===
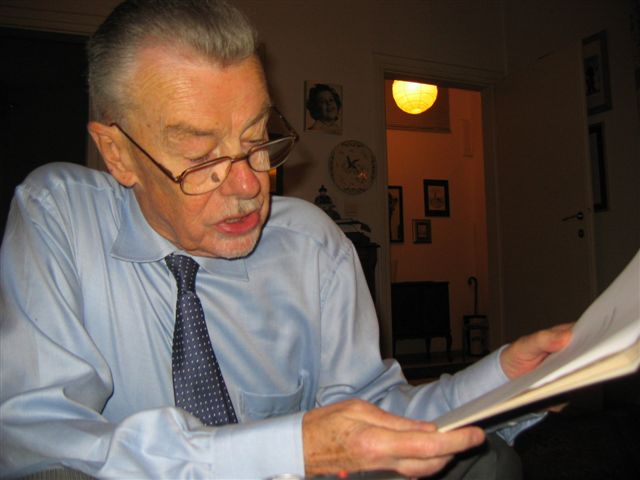
Jan Kułakowski

- 4 June – Jerzy Świątkiewicz, Polish lawyer (b. 1925)
- 6 June – Stefan Kuryłowicz, Polish architect (b. 1949)
- 13 June – Onil, Polish rapper (b. 1980)
- 18 June – Marek Szufa, Polish pilot, vice-champion in gliding Aerobatic Flying (b. 1954)
- 25 June – Jan Kułakowski, Polish politician and trade-unionist (b. 1930)
- 27 June – Maciej Zembaty, Polish poet, translator, musician, satirist (b. 1944)
- 30 June – Tadeusz Skutnik, Polish journalist and poet (b. 1947)

=== July ===
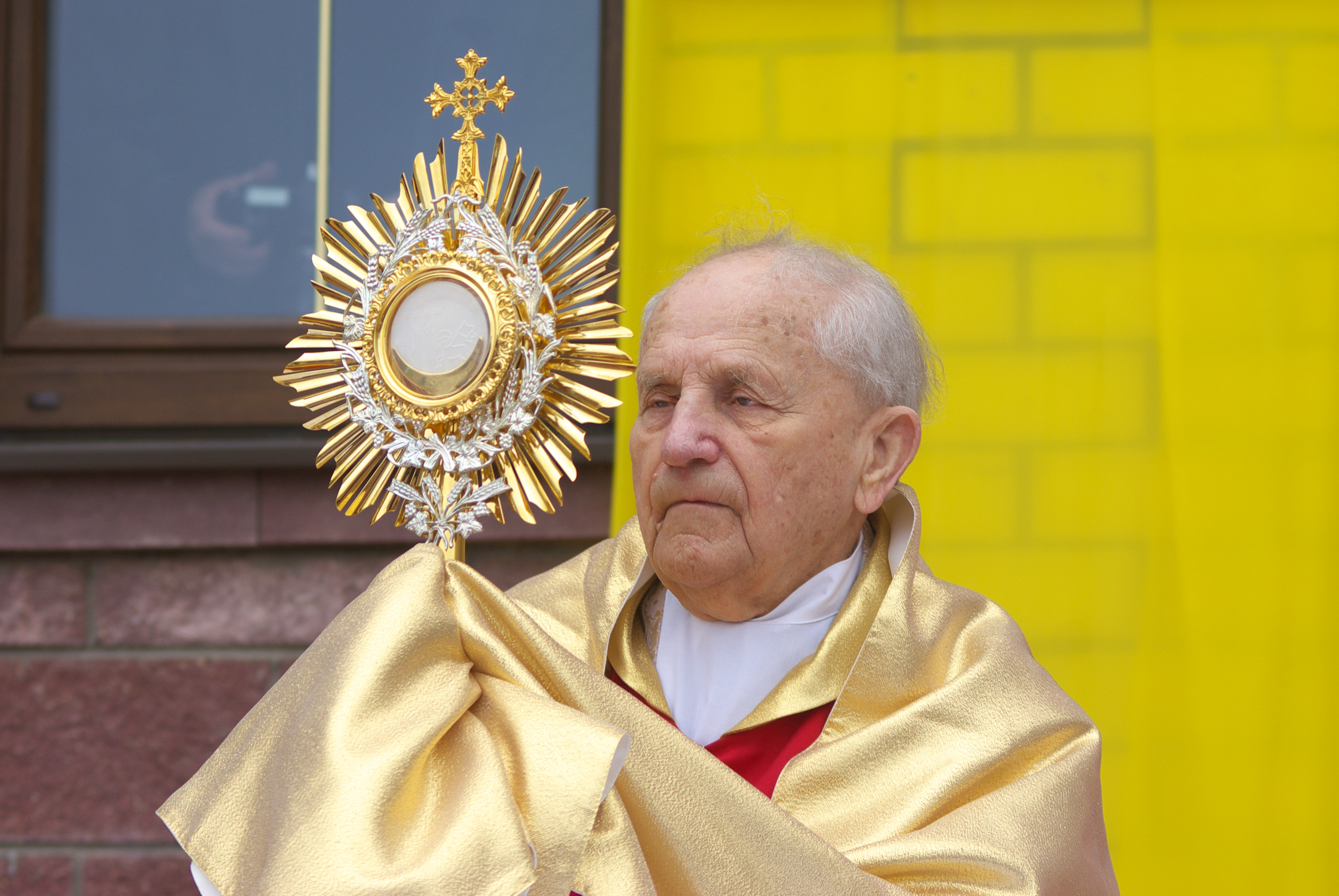
Kazimierz Świątek

- 12 July – Roman Stanisław Ingarden, mathematical physicist (b. 1920)
- 16 July:
  - Albin Małysiak, Polish cleric, Roman Catholic Bishop of Kraków (b. 1917)
  - Kazimierz Neumann, Polish rower (b. 1933)
- 20 July – Rafał Balcewicz, Polish ice hockey player (b. 1987)
- 21 July:
  - Andrzej Zalewski, Polish radio journalist (b. 1924)
  - Kazimierz Świątek, Polish Catholic spiritual, Roman Catholic Cardinal (b. 1914)
- 23 July – Janusz Gniatkowski, Polish singer (b. 1928)

=== August ===
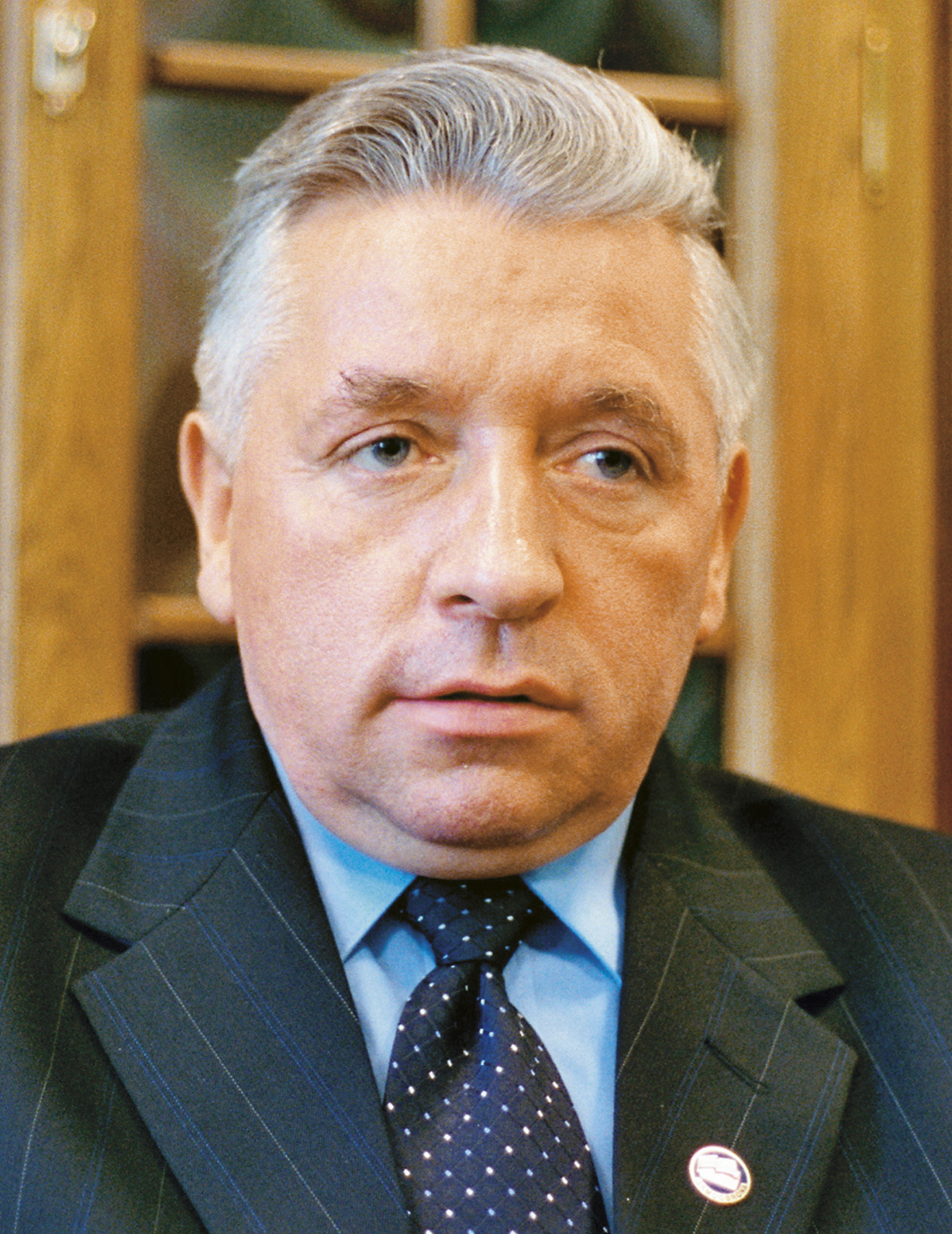
Andrzej Lepper

- 5 August – Andrzej Lepper, Polish unionist, politician, Deputy Prime Minister, Minister of Agriculture (b. 1954)
- 6 August – Roman Opałka, Polish painter and graphic artist (b. 1931)
- 13 August – Jerzy Masztaler, Polish football coach (b. 1946)
- 19 August – Janusz Kierzkowski, Polish track cyclist (b. 1947)
- 21 August – Maria Kornatowska, Polish film critic, essayist, lecturer at the Łódź Film School (b. 1943)
- 22 August – Andrzej Urbanowicz, Polish painter and visual artist (b. 1938)

=== September ===
- 3 September – Andrzej Maria Deskur, Polish Catholic cleric, Cardinal (b. 1924)
- 6 September:
  - Janusz Morgenstern, Polish film director (b. 1922)
  - Damian Szojda, Polish Franciscan, an interpreter the Bible (b. 1932)
- 15 September – Regina Smendzianka, Polish pianist and pedagogue (b. 1924)
- 16 September – Maria Sawicka, Polish social activist, lawyer (b. 1923)
- 17 September:
  - Magda Teresa Wójcik, Polish actress, film director (b. 1934)
  - Tomasz Zygadło, Polish film director, screenwriter (b. 1947)

== See also ==
- 2011 in Polish television
