= Wiesław Dawidowski =

Polish Roman Catholic priest

- Provincial Superior; Augustinian Province of Poland
- Church: Catholic Church

Orders
- Ordination: 14 June 1991

Personal details
- Born: March 14, 1964 (age 61); Gdynia, Poland
- Occupation: Priest, journalist

Wiesław Dawidowski, OSA (born 14 March 1964) is a Polish priest of the Roman Catholic Church. A member of the Augustinians, he has worked as a journalist and commentator. From 2007 to 2012 he was the anchorman of Religia.tv. He was the Christian Co-chair of the Polish Council of Christians and Jews from 2009 to 2013. He has been the Provincial Superior of the Augustine Order in Poland since 2012.

== Biography ==
Dawidowski was born on 14 March 1964 in Gdynia.

During the martial law in Poland (1981–1983), Dawidowski was sentenced to six months of incarceration for active involvement in underground anti-Communist youth resistance movement. They had been distributing leaflets with information about the Solidarity radio station. While in prison, he went on hunger strike with a group of political prisoners to protest against the debasing treatment of women inmates.

Dawidowski joined the Augustinian Order in 1987 and was ordained a priest on 14 June 1991. He graduated from the Theological Institute of Missionary Priests in Krakow, studied at the Cardinal Stefan Wyszyński University in Warsaw, and earned a doctorate in fundamental theology at the Pontifical Gregorian University in Rome. His dissertation entitled On the theological method of Saint Augustine, the patron saint of his order.

Dawidowski first worked as a youth pastor and catechist from 1991 to 1995. He served as an assistant and then from 2001 to 2004 as parish priest of Saint Catherine of Alexandria parish in Kraków. He later established and supervised the Augustinian monastery in Łomianki, the Augustinians' only centre in Poland outside Kraków. In 2004, he became the head of the Warsaw Archdiocese' Centre for the Pastoral Care of Anglophone Foreigners. He has taught fundamental theology at the Higher Theological Seminary in Gródek Podolski in Ukraine and at the Roman Catholic Theological Institute in Lviv.

In 2009, Dawidowski was named the Christian Co-chair of the Polish Council of Christians and Jews.

In a 2010 interview he described himself as "anti-clerical" and mocked seminaries who acted a role as if they had to perform as priests. He explained that years performing menial tasks in a monastery were crucial in his formation.

In June 2012, the General Chapter of the Polish Province of the Augustinian Order elected him Provincial Superior.

On 12 July 2013, he resigned from his post as co-chairman of the Polish Council of Christians and Jews, citing the burdens of his other duties. Although Poland's Catholic Information Agency reported that he had left the Council because of a letter his Jewish co-chairman released on 14 July expressing support for Wojciech Lemanski, a Catholic priest recently suspended by his bishop, Dawidowski denied that interpretation and said that his workload drove his decision.

In 2018, during protests calling for government prosecution of priests accused of sexual abuse, he said he doubted the Church would exploit its relationship with government officials to protect abusers, "but anything is possible". To address the issue, he advised:

Simple prayer for repentance is not enough, neither [is] financial compensation. We need something more. First, we must meet victims as persons and to understand them, beg for forgiveness and ask them what kind of healing process can be implemented. Second, we ought to transform entirely the model of priesthood from a prestige model to humble servant of the society model. Finally, we must address the issues of sexual integrity from the very first days of formation of our clergy.

Dawidowski authored blog on the Religia website called "Przed kruchtą" (On the front porch). He has been a columnist for the Catholic weekly Tygodnik Powszechny and for two monthly publications, Więź and W drodze. He has frequently been quoted in the English media about topics concerning the Catholic Church in Poland.

As of 2018 he was vice-president of the National Conference of the Major Superiors of the Religious Orders in Poland.

On 22 February 2023, Ash Wednesday, he celebrated Mass in a Warsaw hotel room and placed ashes on the forehead of US President Joe Biden, who was visiting Poland and Ukraine.
