= 2012 in Poland =

- Decades: 1990s; 2000s; 2010s; 2020s
- See also: Other events of 2012; Timeline of Polish history

Events during the year 2012 in Poland.

== Incumbents ==
Incumbents
Position	Person	Party
President	Bronisław Komorowski	Independent (Supported by the Civic Platform)
Prime Minister	Donald Tusk	Civic Platform
Marshal of the Sejm	Ewa Kopacz	Civic Platform
Marshal of the Senate	Bogdan Borusewicz	Independent (Supported by the Civic Platform)

== Events ==
=== March ===
- 3 March – Szczekociny rail crash

=== April ===
- 22 April – Resovia won their fifth Polish Volleyball Championship defeating Skra Bełchatów in the finals (see 2011–12 PlusLiga).

=== June ===
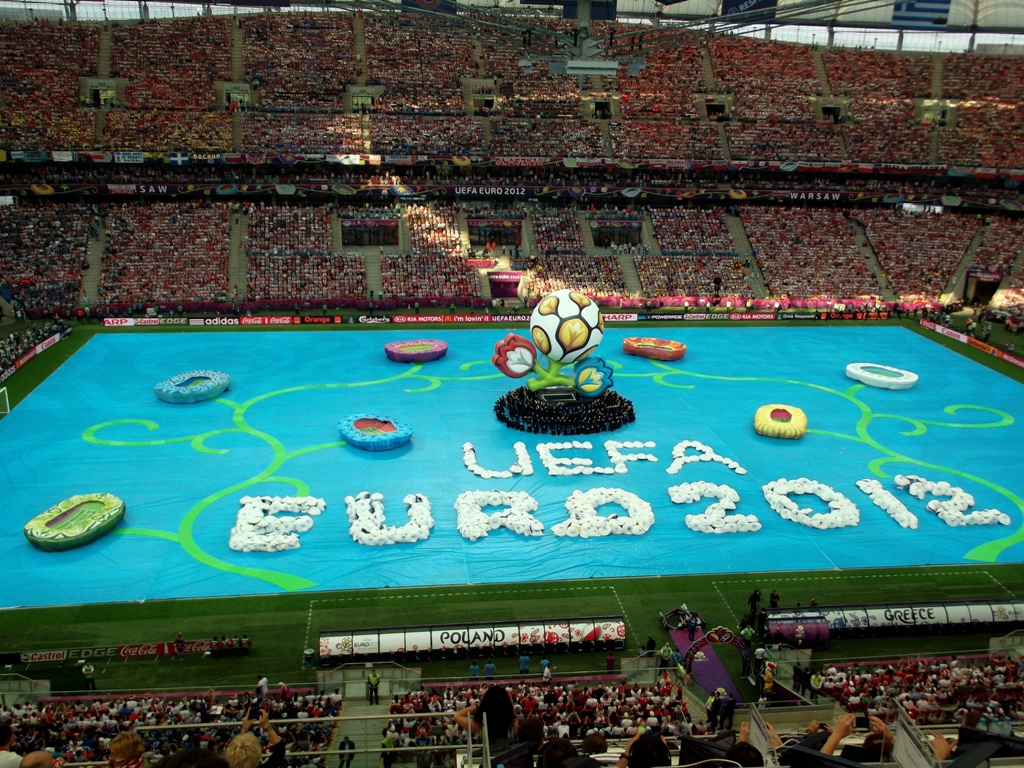
Opening ceremony of the UEFA Euro 2012 in Warsaw, 8 June 2012

- 8–28 June – Poland co-hosts the UEFA Euro 2012.

=== October ===
- 14 October – Unia Tarnów won their third Team Speedway Polish Championship defeating Stal Gorzów Wielkopolski in the finals (see 2012 Polish speedway season).

== Deaths ==
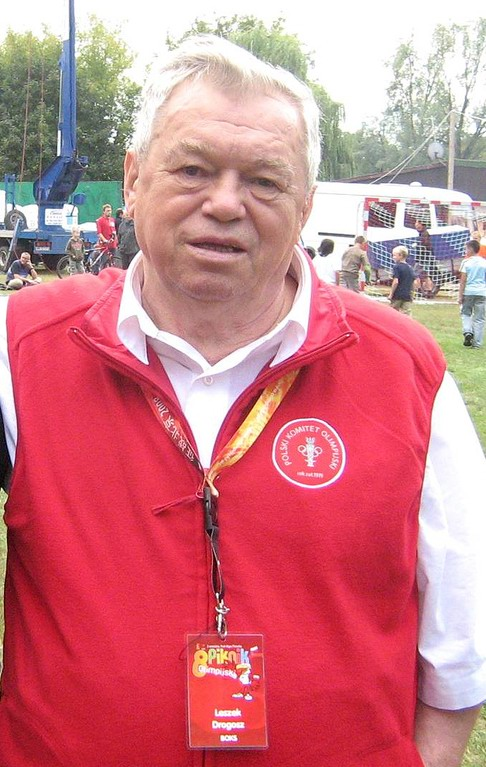
Leszek Drogosz

- 5 March – Marek Kuszewski, fencer (born 1933).
- 7 September – Leszek Drogosz, boxer and actor (born 1933).
- 10 October – Piotr Lenartowicz, philosopher (born 1934).
- 11 October – Edward Kossoy, lawyer, publicist and activist for victims of Nazism (born 1913).
- 17 November – Henryk Grzybowski, footballer (born 1934)

== See also ==
- 2012 in Polish television
