= 2001 in Polish television =

This is a list of Polish television related events from 2001.

== Events ==
- 3 March - The Polish version of Big Brother debuts on TVN.
- 17 June - The first series of Big Brother is won by Janusz Dzięcioł.
- 16 December - Marzena Wieczorek wins the second series of Big Brother.

== Debuts ==
- 3 March - Big Brother (2001-2002, 2007–2008)

=== International ===
English Title	Polish Title	Network	Date
(Scotland) Meeow!	Kocie przygody	TVP3; MiniMax	2001

== Television shows ==
=== 1990s ===
- Klan (1997–present)

=== 2000s ===
- M jak miłość (2000–present)

== Networks and services ==
=== Launches ===
Network	Type	Launch date	Notes	Source
Zone Club	Cable television	1 April		
Wizja Info	Cable television	25 July		

=== Closures ===
Network	Type	End date	Notes	Sources
Fantastic	Cable and satellite	1 July		
