= 2016 in Poland =

- Decades: 1990s; 2000s; 2010s; 2020s
- See also: Other events of 2016; Timeline of Polish history

== Incumbents ==
Incumbents
Position	Person	Party
President	Andrzej Duda	Independent (Supported by the Law and Justice)
Prime Minister	Beata Szydło	Law and Justice
Marshal of the Sejm	Marek Kuchciński	Law and Justice
Marshal of the Senate	Stanisław Karczewski	Law and Justice

== Events ==
=== January ===
- 1 January – Four localities were granted town rights: Jaraczewo, Lubycza Królewska, Siedliszcze, and Urzędów.

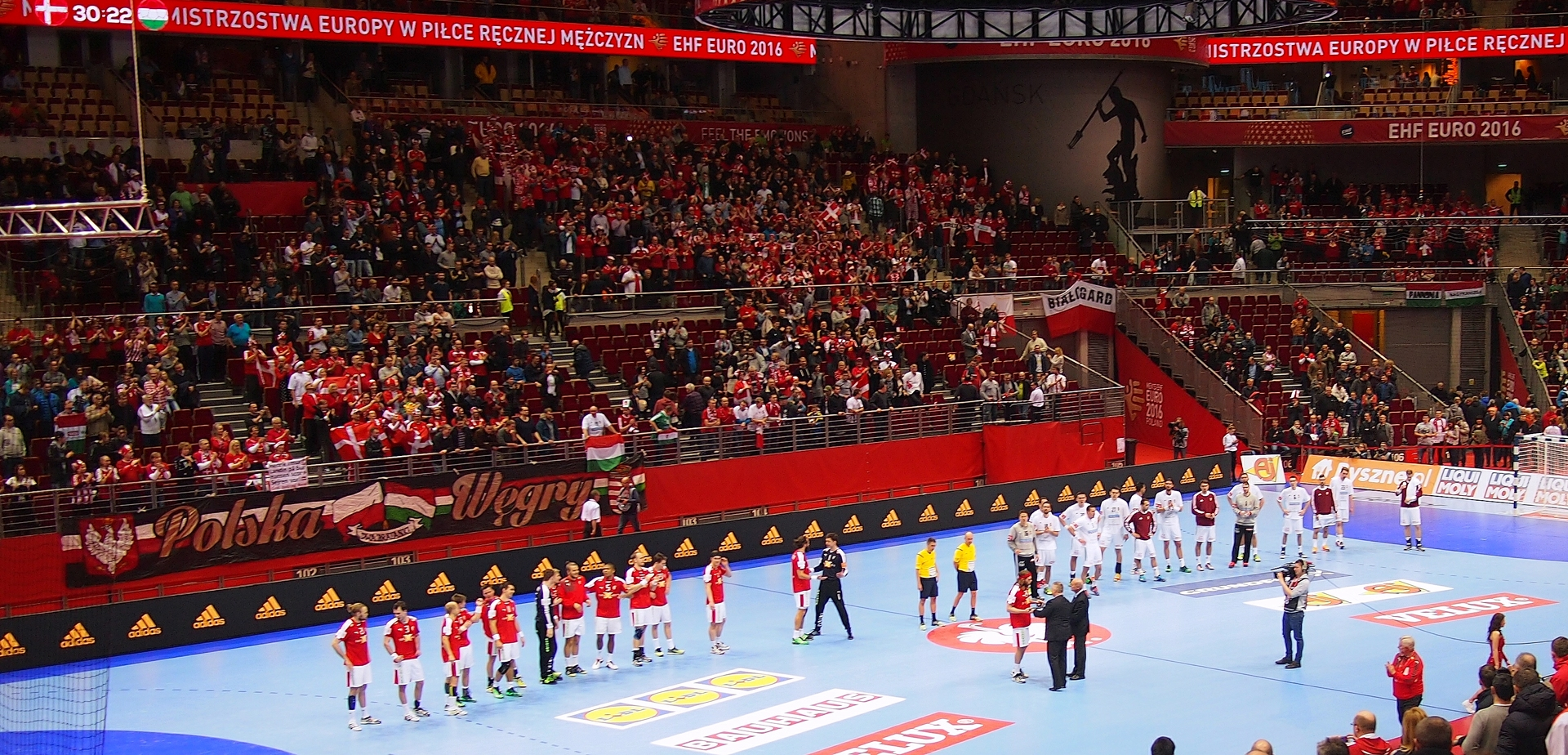
Denmark v Hungary match in the 2016 European Men's Handball Championship in Gdańsk, 20 January 2016

- 15–31 January — Poland hosts the 2016 European Men's Handball Championship.

=== April ===
- 26 April – ZAKSA Kędzierzyn-Koźle won their sixth Polish Volleyball Championship defeating Resovia in the finals (see 2015–16 PlusLiga).

=== June ===
- 2 June – Stelmet Zielona Góra won their third Polish Basketball Championship defeating Rosa Radom in the finals (see 2015–16 PLK season).

=== August ===
- 5–21 August — 87 athletes from Poland compete at the 2016 Summer Olympics in Rio de Janeiro, Brazil

=== September ===
- 3 September — Poland win the eighteenth edition of the Eurovision Young Musicians in Cologne, Germany.
- 25 September — Stal Gorzów Wielkopolski won their ninth Team Speedway Polish Championship defeating KS Toruń in the finals (see 2016 Polish speedway season).

=== December ===
- From 8 December — State Owned PZU together with Polish Development Fund acquired Bank Pekao, Poland's second largest bank previously owned by UniCredit, by buying a 32.8 per cent stake in the bank for the amount of PLN 10.6 billion (EUR 2.6 billion).
- From 16 December — protests against law limiting of freedom of the press.

== Deaths ==
- 1 April – Artur Górski MP (2005–2016)

== See also ==
- 2016 in Polish television
