= 2014 in Poland =

- Decades: 1990s; 2000s; 2010s; 2020s
- See also: Other events of 2014; Timeline of Polish history

The following lists events that happened during 2014 in Poland.

== Incumbents ==
Incumbents
Position	Person	Party	Notes
President	Bronisław Komorowski	Independent (Supported by the Civic Platform)	
Prime Minister	Donald Tusk	Civic Platform	Until 22 September 2014
Prime Minister	Ewa Kopacz	Civic Platform	From 22 September 2014
Marshal of the Sejm	Ewa Kopacz	Civic Platform	Until 22 September 2014
Marshal of the Sejm	Jerzy Wenderlich	Democratic Left Alliance	22 September 2014 - 24 September 2014 (Acting)
Marshal of the Sejm	Radosław Sikorski	Civic Platform	From 24 September 2014
Marshal of the Senate	Bogdan Borusewicz	Independent (Supported by the Civic Platform)	

=== Elections ===
European election, 2014
National party	European party	Leader	Popular vote	Percentage	Seats
Civic Platform	EPP	Donald Tusk	2,271,215	32.13%	19 / 51
Law and Justice	ECR	Jarosław Kaczyński	2,246,870	31.78%	19 / 51
Democratic Left Alliance–Labour Union	PES	Leszek Miller	667,319	9.44%	5 / 51
Congress of the New Right	None	Janusz Korwin-Mikke	505,586	7.15%	4 / 51
Polish People's Party	EPP	Waldemar Pawlak	480,846	6.8%	4 / 51
Other	Varies	Varies	897,488 (Total)	12.7% (Total)	0 / 51
Total and turnout			7,502,336	23.83%	51

== Events ==
=== January ===
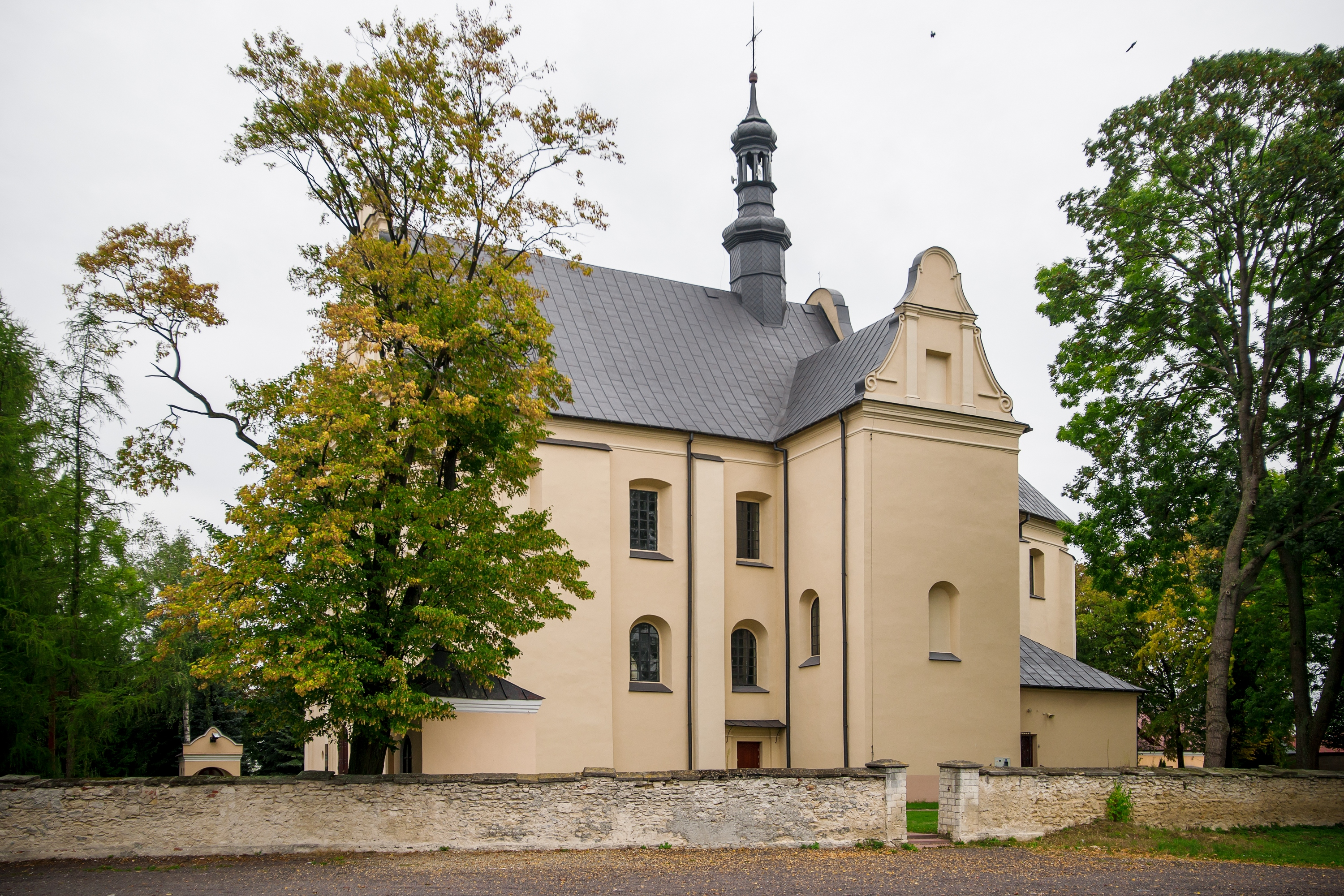
Baroque church in Modliborzyce in 2013

- 1 January – Five localities were granted town rights: Dobrzyca, Modliborzyce, Mrozy, Stepnica, and Zaklików.

=== April ===
- 27 April – Skra Bełchatów won their sixth Polish Volleyball Championship defeating Resovia in the finals (see 2013–14 PlusLiga).

=== May ===
- 25 May
  - 2014 European Parliament election in Poland
  - 2014 Kraków referendum

=== June ===
- 14 June - Beginning of Polish bugging affair (pl)

=== August ===
- 19 August – The second Polish scientific satellite, Heweliusz, is launched.

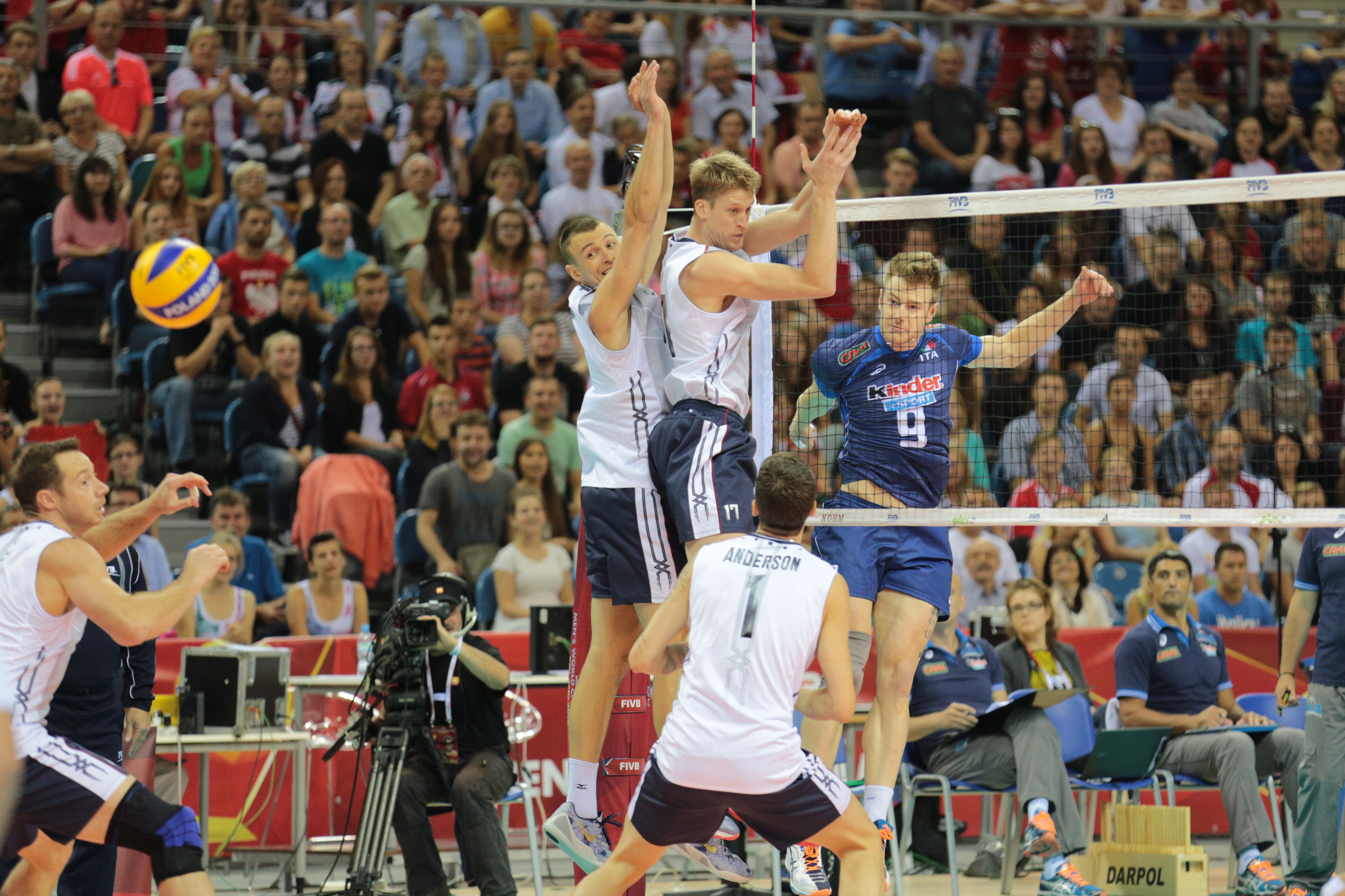
Italy v United States match in the 2014 FIVB Men's Volleyball World Championship in Kraków, 7 September 2014

- 30 August–21 September – Poland hosts the 2014 FIVB Men's Volleyball World Championship.

=== September ===
- 15 September – Ewa Kopacz becomes Poland's second female prime minister.

=== October ===
- 5 October – Stal Gorzów Wielkopolski won their eighth Team Speedway Polish Championship defeating Unia Leszno in the finals (see 2014 Polish speedway season).

=== December ===
- 10 December - The Constitutional Court overturns the 2013 ban on ritual slaughter of animals.

== Deaths ==
- 10 January - Zbigniew Messner, Communist politician (born 1929)
- 25 May - Wojciech Jaruzelski, former Communist leader of Poland (born 1923)
- 22 June - Grzegorz Knapp, motorcycle racer (born 1979)
- 24 December - Krzysztof Krauze, film director (born 1953)
- 26 December - Stanisław Barańczak, poet (born 1946)
- 30 December - Marian Jurczyk, Solidarność activist (born 1935)

== See also ==
- 2014 in Polish television
