= Jagoda Stach =

Polish actress

Jagoda Stach (born 26 December 1983), former Polish child actress, currently non-professional actress.

She reached popularity through her three appearances on Mini Lista Przebojow, a Polish music program for children. She appeared in nine movies, series and TV theatre plays, between 1992 and 2003. Her most recognizable role was the one in Klan TV-series, where she has been appearing (with breaks) for 10 years.
