= 2013 in Poland =

- Decades: 1990s; 2000s; 2010s; 2020s
- See also: Other events of 2013; Timeline of Polish history

Events from the year 2013 in Poland.

== Incumbents ==
Incumbents
| Position | Person | Party |
|---|---|---|
| President | Bronisław Komorowski | Independent (Supported by the Civic Platform) |
| Prime Minister | Donald Tusk | Civic Platform |
| Marshal of the Sejm | Ewa Kopacz | Civic Platform |
| Marshal of the Senate | Bogdan Borusewicz | Independent (Supported by the Civic Platform) |

== Events ==
- 25–26 January – Sanok hosts the 2013 Team Ice Racing World Championship.
- 19 March – Two football fans were killed and 52 injured in a bus crash in central Poland.
- 24 March – Bydgoszcz hosts the 2013 IAAF World Cross Country Championships.
- 20 April – Resovia won their sixth Polish Volleyball Championship defeating ZAKSA Kędzierzyn-Koźle in the finals (see 2012–13 PlusLiga).
- 2 June – Stelmet Zielona Góra won their first Polish Basketball Championship defeating Turów Zgorzelec in the finals (see 2012–13 PLK season).

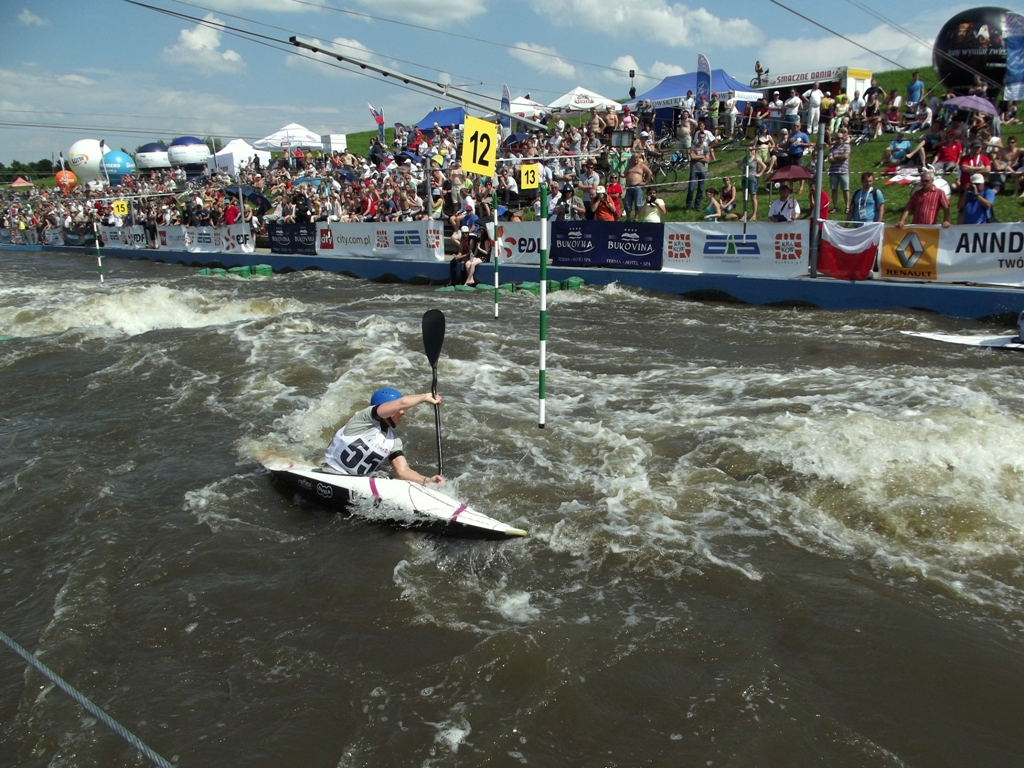
2013 European Canoe Slalom Championships in Kraków, 9 June 2013

- 6–9 June – Kraków hosts the 2013 European Canoe Slalom Championships.
- 22 September – Falubaz Zielona Góra won their seventh Team Speedway Polish Championship defeating Unibax Toruń in the finals (see 2013 Polish speedway season).

== Deaths ==
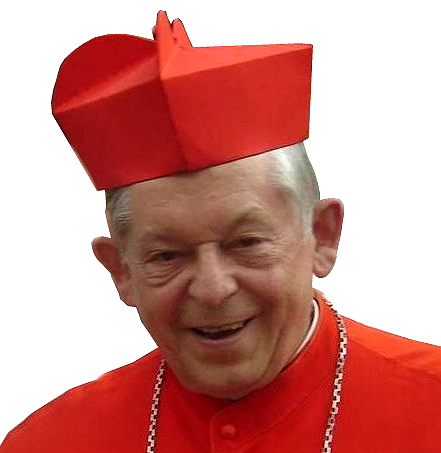
Józef Glemp

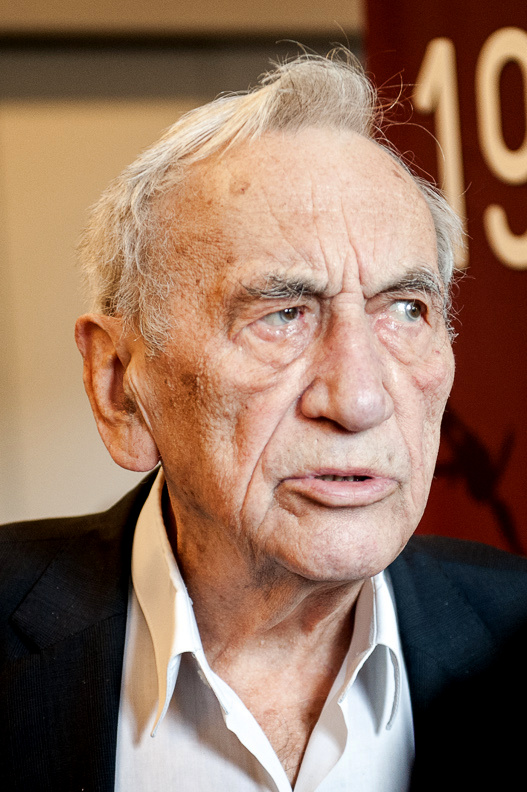
Tadeusz Mazowiecki

- January 23 - Józef Glemp, 83, Polish Cardinal of the Roman Catholic Church. (born 1929)
- April 11 - Hilary Koprowski, 96, Polish virologist and immunologist. (born 1916)
- October 28 - Tadeusz Mazowiecki, 86, 1st Prime Minister of Poland. (born 1927)

== See also ==
- 2013 in Polish television
