= 2012 in Polish television =

This is a list of Polish television related events from 2012.

== Events ==
- 2 June – Dawid Podsiadło wins the second series of X Factor.
- 24 November – Acrobatic duo Delfina Przeszłowska & Bartek Byjoś win the fifth series of Mam talent!.

== Television shows ==
=== 1990s ===
- Klan (1997–present)

=== 2000s ===
- M jak miłość (2000–present)
- Na Wspólnej (2003–present)
- Pierwsza miłość (2004–present)
- Dzień Dobry TVN (2005–present)
- Mam talent! (2008–present)

=== 2010s ===
- The Voice of Poland (2011–present)
- X Factor (2011–present)

== Networks and services ==
=== Launches ===
Network	Type	Launch date	Notes	Source
TTV	Cable television	1 January		
Water Planet	Cable television	14 May		
Novela TV	Cable television	14 May		
Polsat Futbol	Cable television	31 May		
AXN Spin	Cable television	1 June		
Puls 2	Cable television	19 July		
ATM Rozrywka	Cable television	1 August		
FightBox	Cable television	1 September		
FilmBox Action	Cable television	4 September		
BYU TV	Cable television	16 September		
Stars. TV	Cable television	19 October		
Food Network	Cable television	22 November		
CBS Action	Cable television	3 December		
Ginx eSports TV	Cable television	3 December		

== See also ==
- 2012 in Poland
