= Andrzej Kot =

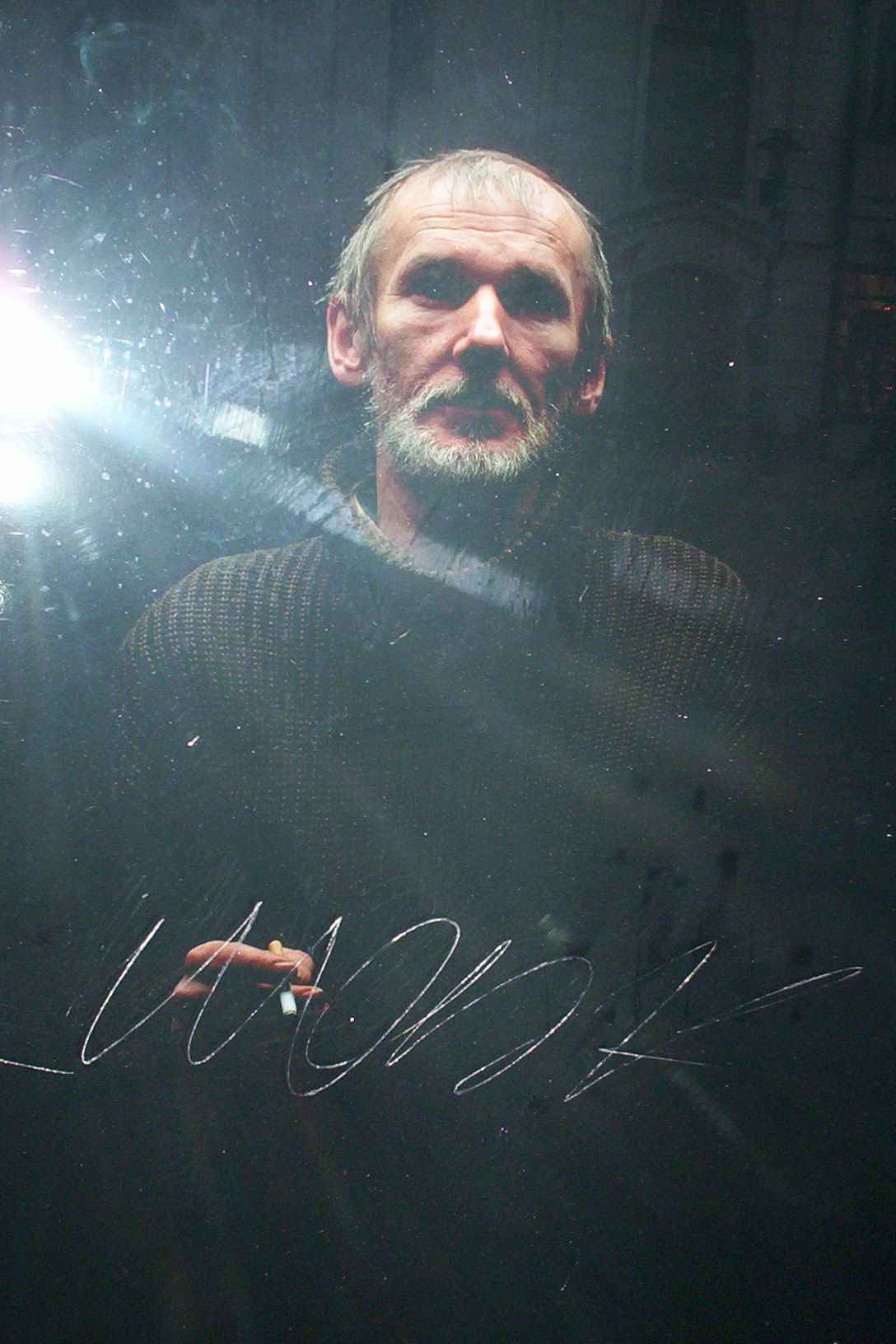
Andrzej Kot

Andrzej Kot (November 21, 1946 – February 17, 2015) was a Polish designer, calligrapher, typesetter, typographer, book illustrator.

Kot has participated since 1978 (Brno Graphic Biennial) in many world graphic events. In 1981 Kot received a gold medal International Biennial Bookplate in Malbork. In professional press for the first time in the Project of May 1980, with a text by Anna Jasińska. Kot promoted the work of designers such as Jan Młodożeniec, Leon Urbanski, Jerzy Jaworowski and Janusz Stanny. The court engraver for the Kingdom of Sweden, creator of hundreds of postage stamps and banknotes, Czeslaw Slania (d. 2005), corresponded with Kot for 15 years.

Dzięki Słani interested the Japanese in publishing Idea – writings on contemporary graphic design. The Japanese released their first album with the work of Andrzej Kot at the end of the 1980s. In Poland, Leo Urbański published Matynia, Andrzej; Kocie, Andrzeju (December 1986), Prawdziwa cnotka nie boi się kotka. Andrzej Matynia o Andrzeju Kocie i jego ekslibrisach [True cnotka book is not afraid of a cat. Andrzej Matynia about Andrzej Kot and his ekslibrisach], Doświadczalna Oficyna Graficzna Pracowni Sztuk Plastycznych. In 2007 a student of Kot and graphic designer, Jacek Wałdowski, published in Lublin two collections of his drawings (third in preparation).

Kot published in Germany Scriptura, in Hungary Magyar Grafika, in New York Upper &LowerCase, in California Fried Caligrafic, Sarmatian Houston and the aforementioned Idea in Tokyo. He was the only Polish artist mentioned in Kiermeier-Debré, Joseph; Vogel, Fritz Franz (1995), Das alphabet. Die Bildwelt der Buchstaben von A bis Z [The alphabet. The visual world of letters from A to Z] (in German), Ravenburger. The Germans appreciated his typefaces Ot-Kot, Lot-Kot, Iza and Kozina.

He contributed a rendering of II Kings 3:16 to Knuth, Donald Ervin (1991), 3:16 Bible Texts Illuminated, Madison, WI, US: A–R, while enduring censorship and hardships in Poland.

The author defines his own work as "play-graphic mess without limitation, in connection with a literary text". Weimar, London and St. Petersburg devoted Kot special congresses. There is a permanent exhibition of his work in the Gutenberg Museum, Mainz. From time to time Kot virtual galleries appear on the Internet (e.g., Regiopolis, Germany, 2004 [2001], archived from the original on 10 December 2002). He publishes since 2002 in Ulicy Wszystkich Świętych (Mail art). 27 January 2008 he was awarded the Angelus in the category Artist of the Year 2007.

== Bibliography ==
- Przychodzki, Lech L; Wałdowski, Jacek (2007), Zwierzę ogoniaste, niekiedy kanciaste [Animal caudate, sometimes angular], Magazyn Obywatel [Citizen Magazine], p. 33, archived from the original on 26 September 2009.
