= 2004 in Polish television =

This is a list of Polish television related events from 2004.

== Events ==
- 4 January - Monika Brodka wins the third series of Idol.

== Debuts ==
- 15 February - Pensjonat pod Różą (2004-2006)
- 4 November - Pierwsza miłość (2004–present)

== Television shows ==
=== 1990s ===
- Klan (1997–present)

=== 2000s ===
- M jak miłość (2000–present)
- Idol (2002-2005)
- Na Wspólnej (2003–present)

== Networks and services ==
=== Launches ===
Network	Type	Launch date	Notes	Source			
4fun.tv	Cable television	14 February					
EbS	Cable television	1 May					
Polsat Cafe	Cable television	1 August			TVN Style	Cable television	1 August
Polsat News 2	Cable television	1 September					
Polsat Viasat History	Cable television	1 September					
Canal+ 1	Cable television	13 November					
