= 2003 in Polish television =

This is a list of Polish television related events from 2003.

== Events ==
- 16 February - Krzysztof Zalewski wins the second series of Idol.

== Debuts ==
- 23 January - Na Wspólnej (2003–present)

== Television shows ==
=== 1990s ===
- Klan (1997–present)

=== 2000s ===
- M jak miłość (2000–present)
- Idol (2002–2005)

== Networks and services ==
=== Launches ===
| Network | Type | Launch date | Notes | Source |
|---|---|---|---|---|
| Fox Kids Play | Cable television | January | | |
| HGTV | Cable television | 10 May | | |
| TVN Meteo | Cable television | 10 May | | |
| TV Trwam | Cable television | 1 June | | |
| Nuta Gold | Cable television | 15 June | | |
| AXN | Cable television | 17 October | | |
| Polsat Viasat Explore | Cable television | 1 November | | |
| TVN Turbo | Cable television | 12 December | | |
| MiniMini+ | Cable television | 20 December | | |
| Kino Polska | Cable television | 20 December | | |
