= Józef Pazdur =

Polish Roman Catholic bishop

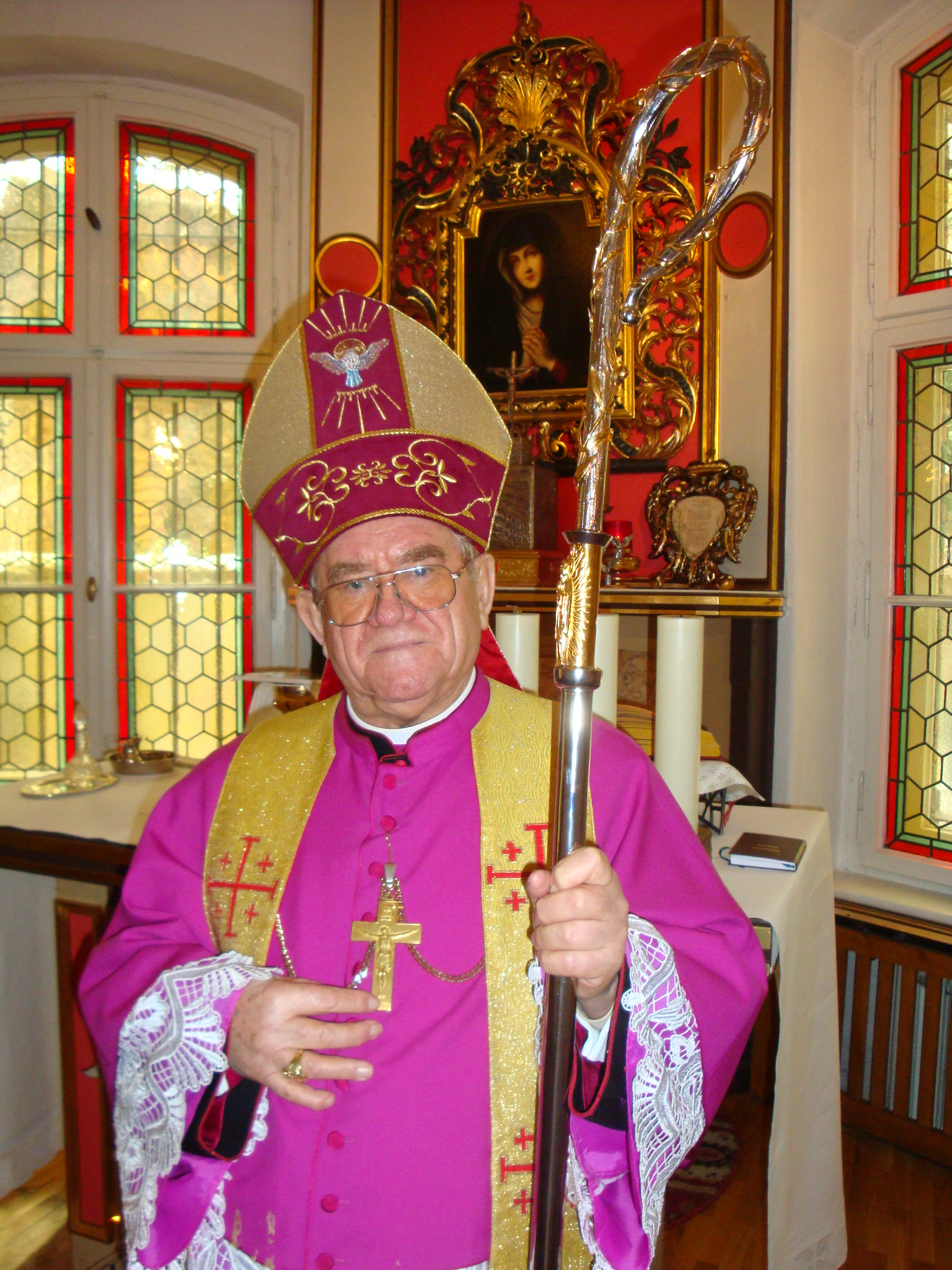
Józef Pazdur (2009)

Józef Pazdur (22 November 1924 – 7 May 2015) was a Polish Catholic bishop.

Ordained to the priesthood in 1951, Pazdur was appointed auxiliary bishop of the Roman Catholic Archdiocese of Wrocław, Poland, in 1984, and retired in 2000.
