= 2006 in Polish television =

This is a list of Polish television related events from 2006.

== Events ==
- 14 May - M jak miłość actor Rafał Mroczek and his partner Aneta Piotrowska win the third series of Taniec z Gwiazdami.
- 12 November - The Dzień Dobry TVN presenter Kinga Rusin and her partner Stefano Terrazzino win the fourth series of Taniec z Gwiazdami.

== Television shows ==
=== 1990s ===
- Klan (1997–present)

=== 2000s ===
- M jak miłość (2000–present)
- Na Wspólnej (2003–present)
- Pierwsza miłość (2004–present)
- Dzień Dobry TVN (2005–present)
- Taniec z gwiazdami (2005-2011, 2014–present)

== Ending this year ==
- Pensjonat pod Różą (2004–2006)

== Networks and services ==
=== Launches ===
Network	Type	Launch date	Notes	Source
Zone Fantasy	Cable television	15 May		
AXN Crime	Cable television	29 May		
AXN Sci-Fi	Cable television	29 May		
AXN White	Cable television	29 May		
AXN Black	Cable television	29 May		
SportKlub	Cable television	29 July		
BabyTV	Cable television	14 September		
Canal+ Kuchnia	Cable television	30 September		
Wydarzenia 24	Cable television	2 October		
Comedy Central	Cable television	19 October		
TVN Med	Cable television	19 October		
FightKlub	Cable television	19 October		
Discovery Historia	Cable television	15 November		
TVP Sport	Cable television	18 November		
Disney Channel	Cable television	2 December		
AMC	Cable television	7 December		

== See also ==
- 2006 in Poland
