= 2007 in Polish television =

This is a list of Polish television related events from 2007.

== Events ==
- 6 May - Syzyfowe prace actor Krzysztof Tyniec and his partner Kamila Kajak win the fifth series of Taniec z Gwiazdami.
- 25 November - Na Wspólnej actress Anna Guzik and her partner Łukasz Czarnecki win the sixth series of Taniec z Gwiazdami.
- 16 December - Jolanta Rutowicz wins the third series of Big Brother.

== Debuts ==
- 2 September - Big Brother (2001-2002, 2007-2008)

== Television shows ==
=== 1990s ===
- Klan (1997–present)

=== 2000s ===
- M jak miłość (2000–present)
- Na Wspólnej (2003–present)
- Pierwsza miłość (2004–present)
- Dzień Dobry TVN (2005–present)
- Taniec z gwiazdami (2005-2011, 2014–present)

== Networks and services ==
=== Launches ===
Network	Type	Launch date	Notes	Source
Fox Comedy	Cable television	4 January		
HBO3	Cable television	1 February		
Love	Cable television	19 February		
TV1000 Polska	Cable television	5 March		
Kino TV	Cable television	29 March		
FilmBox Premium	Cable television	29 March		
National Geographic Wild	Cable television	27 April		
Duck TV	Cable television	16 May		
TVN24 BIS	Cable television	3 September		
Da Vinci	Cable television	15 September		
Religia.tv	Cable television	15 October		
FilmBox Extra	Cable television	1 December		
Universal Channel	Cable television	1 December		

== See also ==
- 2007 in Poland
