= 2009 in Polish television =

This is a list of Polish television related events from 2009.

== Events ==
- 17 May - TVN Meteo weathergirl Dorota Gardias and her partner Andrej Mosejcuk win the ninth series of Taniec z Gwiazdami.
- 29 November - Schindler's List actress Anna Mucha and her partner Rafał Maserak win the tenth series of Taniec z Gwiazdami.
- 5 December - 28-year-old piano accordionist Marcin Wyrostek wins the second series of Mam talent!.

== Debuts ==
=== International ===
English Title	Polish Title	Network	Date
(United Kingdom) Horrid Henry	Koszmarny Karolek	TVP1	3 March
(United States) / (Canada) / (United Kingdom) Martha Speaks	Marta mówi	MiniMini+	16 September

== Television shows ==
=== 1990s ===
- Klan (1997–present)

=== 2000s ===
- M jak miłość (2000–present)
- Na Wspólnej (2003–present)
- Pierwsza miłość (2004–present)
- Dzień Dobry TVN (2005–present)
- Taniec z gwiazdami (2005-2011, 2014–present)
- Mam talent! (2008–present)

== Networks and services ==
=== Launches ===
Network	Type	Launch date	Notes	Source
ID	Cable television	6 April		
Eska TV	Cable television	28 May		
Animal Planet	Cable television	9 September		
Polsat Futbol	Cable television	17 September		
Polsat Film	Cable television	2 October		
4fun Kids	Cable television	14 December		

=== Conversions and rebrandings ===
Old network name	New network name	Type	Conversion date	Notes	Source
Toon Disney	Disney XD	Cable television	19 September		

== See also ==
- 2009 in Poland
