= 2002 in Polish television =

This is a list of Polish television related events from 2002.

== Events ==
- 6 January - The Polish version of Pop Idol debuts on Polsat.
- 26 May - Piotr Borucki wins series 3 of Big Brother.
- 30 June - Alicja Janosz wins the first series of Idol.

== Debuts ==
=== Domestic ===
- 6 January - Idol (2002-2005)

=== International ===
English Title	Polish Title	Network	Date
(Croatia) / (Germany) Lapitch the Little Shoemaker	Przygody szewczyka Grzesia	TVP1	17 February 2002

== Television shows ==
=== 1990s ===
- Klan (1997-present)

=== 2000s ===
- M jak miłość (2000-present)

== Ending this year ==
- Big Brother (2001-2002, 2007-2008)

== Networks and services ==
=== Launches ===
Network	Type	Launch date	Notes	Source
Mango	Cable television	1 March		
TVN7	Cable television	1 March		
MTV Classic	Cable television	30 May		
Red Carpet TV	Cable television	9 November		
HBO2	Cable television	1 December		

=== Closures ===
Network	Type	End date	Notes	Sources
Wizja Pogoda	Cable and satellite	1 March		
Wizja Info	Cable television	15 March		
