= 1999 in Polish television =

This is a list of Polish television related events from 1999.

== Events ==
- Unknown - Marcin Szaniawski, performing as Jay Kay wins the second and final series of Zostań gwiazdą.

== Debuts ==
=== International ===
English Title	Polish Title	Network	Date
(United States) The Brothers Flub	Bracia Flub	Canal+	20 September

== Television shows ==
=== 1990s ===
- Klan (1997–present)

== Ending this year ==
- Zostań gwiazdą (1998-1999)

== Networks and services ==
=== Launches ===
Network	Type	Launch date	Notes	Source
CBS Europe	Cable television	30 March		
E!	Cable television	2 April		
Ale Kino+	Cable television	16 April		
Minimax	Cable television	16 April		
Teletoon+	Cable television	16 April		
Fantastic	Cable television	1 November		

=== Conversions and rebrandings ===
Old network name	New network name	Type	Conversion Date	Notes	Source
[[]]		Cable and satellite			

=== Closures ===
Network	Type	End date	Notes	Sources
Twoja Wizja	Cable television	17 September		
