= 2015 in Polish television =

This is a list of Polish television related events from 2015.

== Events ==
- 16 January - Fox Comedy launches
- 22 May - Szpilki na Giewoncie actor Krzysztof Wieszczek and his partner Agnieszka Kaczorowska win the sixteenth series of Taniec z Gwiazdami, becoming the first male celebrity since Rafał Mroczek in the third series to beat a female celebrity to win the show.
- 27 November - Singer Ewelina Lisowska and her partner Tomasz Barański win the seventeenth series of Taniec z Gwiazdami.
- 28 November - 21-year-old aerial silk artist Aleksandra Kiedrowicz wins the eighth series of Mam talent!. Krzysztof Iwaneczko wins the sixth series of The Voice of Poland on the same evening.

== Television shows ==
=== 1990s ===
- Klan (1997–present)

=== 2000s ===
- M jak miłość (2000–present)
- Na Wspólnej (2003–present)
- Pierwsza miłość (2004–present)
- Dzień Dobry TVN (2005–present)
- Taniec z gwiazdami (2005-2011, 2014–present)
- Mam talent! (2008–present)

=== 2010s ===
- The Voice of Poland (2011–present)
- X Factor (2011–present)

== Networks and services ==
=== Launches ===
Network	Type	Launch date	Notes	Source
Discovery Life	Cable television	1 February		
TVN Fabula	Cable television	16 April		
Canal+ Sport 2	Cable television	11 May		
13.tv	Cable television	8 June		
Eleven Sports 1	Cable television	2 August		
Eleven Sports 2	Cable television	22 August		
Nuta.TV	Cable television	1 September		
Nat Geo People	Cable television	1 October		
Top Kids	Cable television	1 December		

=== Closures ===
Network	Type	End date	Notes	Sources
Religia.tv	Cable television	31 January		
TVN Meteo	Cable and satellite	15 April		

== See also ==
- 2015 in Poland
