= 1998 in Polish television =

This is a list of Polish television related events from 1998.

== Events ==
- Unknown - Debut of Zostań gwiazdą, a series hosted by Krzysztof Ibisz in which members of the public impersonate their favourite singers.
- Unknown - The first series of Zostań gwiazdą is won by Magdalena Piwowarczyk performing as Sinéad O'Connor.

== Debuts ==
=== Domestic ===
- Unknown - Zostań gwiazdą (1998-1999)

=== International ===
| English Title | Polish Title | Network | Date |
|---|---|---|---|
| (United States) Dexter's Laboratory | Laboratorium Dextera | Cartoon Network | 1 September |

== Television shows ==
=== 1990s ===
- Klan (1997–present)

== Networks and services ==
=== Launches ===
| Network | Type | Launch date | Notes | Source |
|---|---|---|---|---|
| Nasza TV | Cable television | 17 January | | |
| 13 Ulica | Cable television | 1 April | | |
| National Geographic | Cable television | 1 April | | |
| Travel Channel | Cable television | 1 April | | |
| Wizja Le Cinema | Cable television | Unknown | | |
| Twoja Wizja | Cable television | 1 April | | |
| Wizja Jeden | Cable television | 1 April | | |
| Wizja Pogoda | Cable television | 1 April | | |
| Toon Disney | Cable television | 18 April | | |
| Cartoon Network | Cable television | 25 June | | |
| Warner TV | Cable television | 1 September | | |
| Canal+ Film | Cable television | 15 November | | |
| Canal+ Sport | Cable television | 1 December | | |
| Tele 5 | Cable television | 14 December | | |
