= Polsat Futbol =

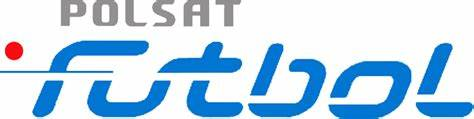
- Country: Poland

Programming
- Picture format: 16:9

Ownership
- Owner: Polsat
- Sister channels: Polsat Sport; Polsat

History
- Launched: September 17, 2009
- Closed: May 31, 2012

Links
- Website: www.polsatsport.pl

Polsat Futbol was a sports channel owned by Polsat, which broadcasts football matches and programmes devoted to football. It was Poland's first channel devoted exclusively to one sport.

It was created for the broadcast of the UEFA Europa League (4 additional channels Polsat Futbol).

Polsat Futbol was replaced by Polsat Sport Extra HD on June 1, 2012.

== See also ==
- Polsat Sport
- Polsat Sport HD
