= Orange Sport (Poland) =

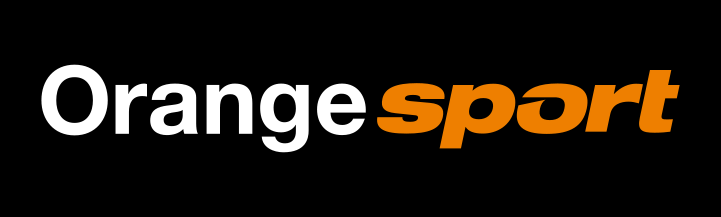
- Country: Poland

Programming
- Picture format: 16:9 576i (SDTV)

Ownership
- Owner: Telekomunikacja Polska

History
- Launched: August 8, 2008
- Closed: December 31, 2016

Orange Sport was a Polish sports channel owned by Telekomunikacja Polska. It was launched on August 8, 2008, and shut down on December 31, 2016, due to low viewership.
