= 1994 in Polish television =

This is a list of Polish television related events from 1994.

== Events ==
- 1 January - Public Polish TV channels with exception for TVP1 switched from SECAM to PAL.
- 30 April - Poland enters the Eurovision Song Contest for the first time with "To nie ja!" performed by Edyta Górniak.

== Debuts ==
=== International ===
English Title	Polish Title	Network	Date
(United States) Darkwing Duck	Dzielny Agent Kaczor	TVP1	12 March
(United Kingdom) Avenger Penguins	Waleczne pingwiny	TVP Regionalna	1994

== Networks and services ==
=== Launches ===
Network	Type	Launch date	Notes	Source
Canal+ Premium	Cable television	17 December		
