= Religia.tv =

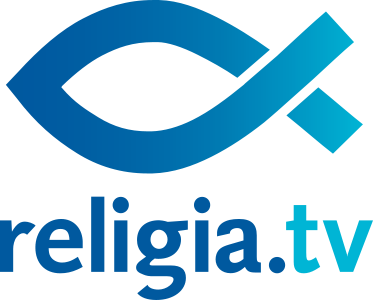
- Country: Poland

Programming
- Picture format: 576i (16:9 SDTV)

Ownership
- Owner: ITI Group

History
- Launched: 15 October 2007; 17 years ago
- Closed: 31 January 2015; 10 years ago

Links
- Website: www.religia.tv

Religia.tv was a religious television channel owned by ITI Group. It was launched on October 15, 2007, at 12:00. In December 2014, it was announced that the broadcasting of Religia.tv would be ended on January 31, 2015.

== See also ==
- Wiesław Dawidowski
