= 2010 in Polish television =

This is a list of Polish television related events from 2010.

== Events ==
- 13 June – BrzydUla actress Julia Kamińska and her partner Rafał Maserak win the eleventh series of Taniec z Gwiazdami.
- 27 November – 11-year-old singer Magda Welc wins the third series of Mam talent!.
- 28 November – Pole vaulter Monika Pyrek and her partner Robert Rowiński win the twelfth series of Taniec z Gwiazdami.

== Debuts ==
=== International ===
English Title	Polish Title	Network	Date
(United Kingdom) Angelina Ballerina: The Next Steps	Roztańczona Angelina: Nowe kroki	MiniMini	1 June

== Television shows ==
=== 1990s ===
- Klan (1997–present)

=== 2000s ===
- M jak miłość (2000–present)
- Na Wspólnej (2003–present)
- Pierwsza miłość (2004–present)
- Dzień Dobry TVN (2005–present)
- Taniec z gwiazdami (2005-2011, 2014–present)
- Mam talent! (2008–present)

== Networks and services ==
=== Launches ===
Network	Type	Launch date	Notes	Source
Crime+ Investigation Polsat HD	Cable television	1 March		
Canal+ Family	Cable television	13 March		
Polsat Viasat Nature	Cable television	5 May		
Disney Junior	Cable television	1 September		
Nick Jr.	Cable television	4 October		
Fox	Cable television	6 November		
TVP Seriale	Cable television	6 December		
Romance TV	Cable television	17 December		
Home TV	Cable television	19 December		

== See also ==
- 2010 in Poland
