= Andrzej Grabarczyk (actor) =

Polish actor (born 1953)

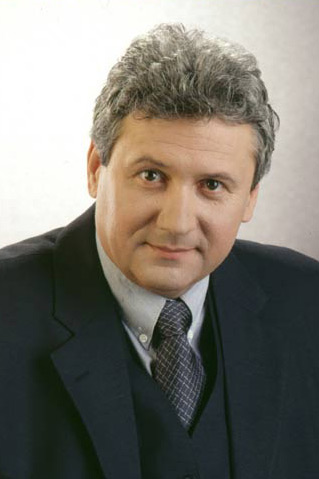
Andrzej Grabarczyk.

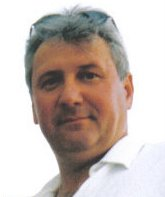
Andrzej Grabarczyk.

Andrzej Grabarczyk (born 31 May 1953 in Włodawa, Poland) is a Polish actor. His father, Wincenty Grabarczyk, is a veteran actor and theatrical director. In 1978, Andrzej completed study at the Warsaw State College Of Theatrical Arts.

== Filmography ==
- "Czernaja metka" (2003)
- "Stare srebra" (2003)
- "Marzenia do spełnienia" (2001)
- "Kiler-ów 2-óch" (1999) as Prezydent RP
- "Matki, żony i kochanki II" (1998) as Leon
- "Sto minut wakacji" (1998)
- "Ucieczka" (1997) as Pal
- "Klan" (1997) as Jerzy Chojnicki
- "Tabatière de l'empereur, La" (1995)
- "Dwa Światy" (English: "Spellbinder", 1994) as Bron
- "Oczy niebieskie" (1994)
- "Fitness Club" (1994–95) Stanisław Murasz
- "Spółka rodzinna" (1994) as agent State Protection Office
- "Ptaszka" (1994) as Lisiecki, also Ptaszki
- "Czterdziestolatek - dwadzieścia lat później" (1993) as police sergeant
- "Pajęczarki" (1993) as Hotel detective
- "Nowe przygody Arsena Lupin" (1993) as police officer
- "Do widzenia wczoraj. Dwie krótkie komedie o zmianie systemu" (1993) as Kościelny from the funeral at Władysława
- "Jacek" (1993)
- "Pamiętnik znaleziony w garbie" (1992) as Francik
- "Żegnaj Rockefeller" (1992) as police inspector
- "Tajna Misja" (1992) as Tomasz
- "Panny i wdowy" (1991) as security man
- "V.I.P." (1991) as Delekty secretary
- "Powodzenia, żołnierzyku" (1991) as Xavier
- "Pogranicze w ogniu" (1991) as Peter
- "Prominent (Eminent Domain)" (1990) as Marek, kierowca Burskiego
- "Historia niemoralna" (1990) as Kazio
- "Urodzony po raz trzeci" (1989) as Leopold Wójcik
- "Lawa" (1989) as Zenon Niemojewski
- "Stan strachu" (1989)
- "Sztuka kochania" (1989) as taxi driver
- "Po własnym pogrzebie" (1989) as Leopold Wójcik
- "W labiryncie" (1988) as officer Militia
- "Obywatel Piszczyk" (1988) as Renata colleague
- "Powrót do Polski" (1988) as Jan Maciaszek
- "Oszołomienie" (1988) as actor/singer
- "Chichot Pana Boga" (1988) as security man
- "Co to konia obchodzi?" (1987)
- "Zabij mnie glino" (1987) as Jachimowski
- "Rajska jabłoń" (1985) as Andrzej
- "Lubię nietoperze" (1985) as gardener
- "111 dni letargu" (1984) as Więzień
- "Przybłęda" (1984)
- "Umarłem, aby żyć" (1984) as Leopold Wójcik
- "Fachowiec" (1983)
- "Na straży swej stać będę" (1983) as Paulek
- "Życie Kamila Kuranta" (1982) as Mieciek
- "Blisko, coraz bliżej" (1982–86) as Tadeusz Pasternik, son Franciszka
- "Był jazz" (1981) as Witek
- "Dziecinne pytania" (1981) as Maciek from TV
- "Dom" (1980) as Politechniki student
- "Punkt widzenia" (1980)
- "Grzeszny żywot Franciszka Buły" (1980) as Franciszek Buła

== Polish dubbing ==
- "The Terminal" (2004) as Viktor Navorski (Tom Hanks)
