= 2013 in Polish television =

This is a list of Polish television related events from 2013.

== Events ==
- 18 May - Natalia Sikora wins the second series of The Voice of Poland.
- 26 May - Klaudia Gawor wins the third series of X Factor, becoming the show's first woman to have won.
- 30 November - 28-year-old sand artist Tetiana Galitsyna wins the sixth series of Mam talent!. Mateusz Ziółko wins the third series of The Voice of Poland on the same evening.

== Television shows ==
=== 1990s ===
- Klan (1997–present)

=== 2000s ===
- M jak miłość (2000–present)
- Na Wspólnej (2003–present)
- Pierwsza miłość (2004–present)
- Dzień Dobry TVN (2005–present)
- Mam talent! (2008–present)

=== 2010s ===
- The Voice of Poland (2011–present)
- X Factor (2011–present)

== Networks and services ==
=== Launches ===
Network	Type	Launch date	Notes	Source
Active Family	Cable television	11 March		
Canal+ Seriale	Cable television	5 April		
TV Republika	Cable television	10 April		
TVP Rozrywka	Cable television	15 April		
Power TV	Cable television	20 November		

=== Closures ===
Network	Type	End date	Notes	Sources
TV1000 Polska	Cable and satellite	16 January		

== See also ==
- 2013 in Poland
