= 2011 in Polish television =

This is a list of Polish television related events from 2011.

== Events ==
- 6 March – Launch of the Polish version of The X Factor.
- 5 June – Gienek Loska wins the first series of X Factor.
- 26 November – 19-year-old singer Kacper Sikora wins the fourth series of Mam talent!.
- 27 November – M jak miłość actor Kacper Kuszewski and his partner Anna Głogowska win the thirteenth series of Taniec z Gwiazdami.
- 6 December – Damian Ukeje wins the first series of The Voice of Poland.

== Debuts ==
=== Domestic ===
- 6 March – X Factor (2011–present)
- 3 September – The Voice of Poland (2011–present)

=== International ===
English Title	Polish Title	Network	Date
(United States) / (Canada) My Little Pony: Friendship is Magic	My Little Pony: Przyjaźń to magia	MiniMini+	15 October

== Television shows ==
=== 1990s ===
- Klan (1997–present)

=== 2000s ===
- M jak miłość (2000–present)
- Na Wspólnej (2003–present)
- Pierwsza miłość (2004–present)
- Dzień Dobry TVN (2005–present)
- Mam talent! (2008–present)

== Ending this year ==
- Taniec z gwiazdami (2005–2011, 2014–present)

== Networks and services ==
=== Launches ===
Network	Type	Launch date	Notes	Source
Sundance TV	Cable television	21 February		
Polo TV	Cable television	7 May		
Kino Polska Muzyka	Cable television	16 May		
Polsat Sport News	Cable television	30 May		
TV6	Cable television	30 May		
Paramount Channel	Cable television	20 July		
4fun Dance	Cable television	27 September		
Nicktoons Polska	Cable television	17 December		

=== Conversions and rebrandings ===
Old network name	New network name	Type	Conversion Date	Notes	Source
		Cable and satellite			

=== Closures ===
Network	Type	End date	Notes	Sources
Zone Fantasy	Cable and satellite	6 September		

== See also ==
- 2011 in Poland
