= Fantastic (TV channel) =

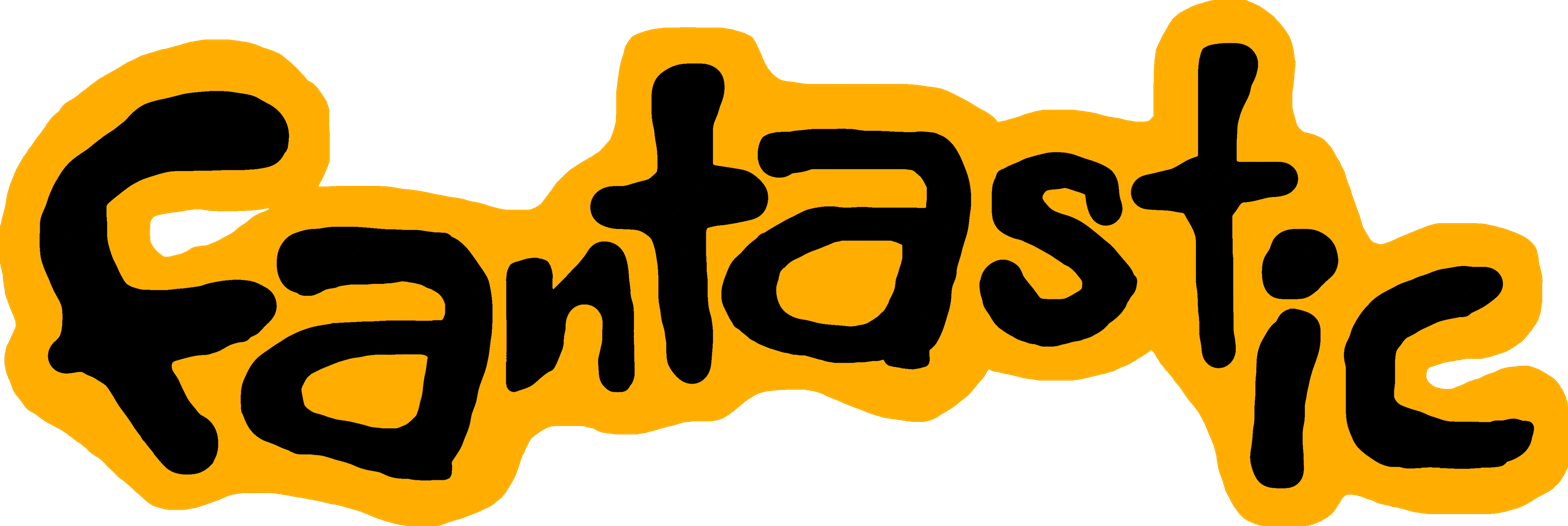
- Country: Poland

Programming
- Languages: Polish and English

Ownership
- Owner: Zone Vision

History
- Launched: 1 November 1999
- Closed: 1 July 2001
- Replaced by: Nickelodeon Poland

Fantastic was a Polish children's television channel owned by Zone Vision. It was launched on 1 November 1999. Daily programming consisted of a twelve-hour block dedicated to Nickelodeon and an additional two-hour block featuring animated shows produced by Gaumont/Xilam.

Initially, the channel showed animated shows and live-action shows with a voice-over. By 2000, all series were dubbed. For a time the station was losing viewers. On 1 July 2001, Zone Vision closed Fantastic channel due to poor performance and low audience reach. Some Nickelodeon cartoons and movies moved into channels like Canal+, MiniMax (now Teletoon+), TVP3, Tele 5, RTL7 (later TVN7), TV4, TVP1, Disney Channel and KidsCo before Nickelodeon Poland was officially launched on July 10, 2008.

== Programming ==
=== Nickelodeon shows ===
==== Animated ====
- The Angry Beavers
- The Wild Thornberrys
- Hey Arnold!
- KaBlam!
- Rugrats
- Aaahh!!! Real Monsters
- The Ren & Stimpy Show
- Rocko's Modern Life
- SpongeBob SquarePants

==== Live Action ====
- Kenan & Kel
- Clarissa Explains It All
- The Journey of Allen Strange
- The Adventures of Pete & Pete
- Hey Dude
- Allegra's Window
- Welcome Freshmen

==== Game Shows ====
- Nickelodeon Guts
- Legends of the Hidden Temple

==== Nick Jr. ====
- Little Bear
- Blue's Clues
- Franklin
- Kipper
- Thomas & Friends
- Little Bill
- Dora the Explorer
- Maggie and the Ferocious Beast

=== Other shows ===
- The Magician
- Space Goofs
- Oggy and the Cockroaches
