= TVN Med =

Polish TV channel for physicians

- Country: Poland
- Broadcast area: Poland
- Network: TVN

Programming
- Picture format: 576i (4:3 SDTV)

Ownership
- Owner: TVN Group

History
- Launched: 19 October 2006; 20 years ago
- Closed: 31 December 2008; 17 years ago

Links
- Website: www.tvnmed.pl

TVN Med was a Polish television channel owned by TVN, the television arm of the ITI Group. It was the only TV channel in Poland with access restricted to just one professional group – namely physicians. It was available on-line and via the n digital platform, but to receive a password allowing to watch it, one had to present a valid medical licence.

All Polish doctors could watch the channel free-of-charge, however starting from October 2007, if they wished to receive it via satellite, they were required to purchase their own set-top box for the platform; previously, these were lent to general practitioners. The channel officially closed on January 1, 2009, when the ITI Group opted to convert the service to an online platform due to insufficient profitability. It was the only Polish channel allowed to air commercials for prescription drugs (according to Polish law, they cannot be presented in media available for the general public), which were its main source of funding. Programming included mostly educational shows for doctors. Poland's Supreme Medical Council accepted watching the channel as part of compulsory training for all doctors (but to be awarded the training points, one had not just to watch the show, but also complete an online test about it).
