= 2014 in Polish television =

This is a list of Polish television related events from 2014.

== Events ==
- 23 May - Pierwsza miłość actress Aneta Zając and her partner Stefano Terrazzino win the fourteenth series of Taniec z Gwiazdami.
- 24 May - Juan Carlos Cano wins the fourth series of The Voice of Poland.
- 31 May - Artem Furman wins the fourth series of X Factor.
- 27 November - M jak miłość actress Agnieszka Sienkiewicz and her partner Stefano Terrazzino win the fifteenth series of Taniec z Gwiazdami.
- 6 December - 15-year-old singer Adrian Makar wins the seventh series of Mam talent!. Aleksandra Nizio wins the fifth series of The Voice of Poland on the same evening.

== Debuts ==
- Taniec z gwiazdami (2005-2011, 2014–present)

== Television shows ==
=== 1990s ===
- Klan (1997–present)

=== 2000s ===
- M jak miłość (2000–present)
- Na Wspólnej (2003–present)
- Pierwsza miłość (2004–present)
- Dzień Dobry TVN (2005–present)
- Mam talent! (2008–present)

=== 2010s ===
- The Voice of Poland (2011–present)
- X Factor (2011–present)

== Networks and services ==
=== Launches ===
Network	Type	Launch date	Notes	Source
Motowizja	Cable television	15 January		
FilmBox Arthouse	Cable television	31 January		
TVP ABC	Cable television	15 February		
Stopklatka TV	Cable television	15 March		
Vox Music TV	Cable television	28 April		
Fokus TV	Cable television	28 April		
Disco Polo Music	Cable television	1 May		
Adventure	Cable television	1 September		
Polsat Music	Cable television	26 September		
History2	Cable television	3 December		

== See also ==
- 2014 in Poland
