= L for Love =

- Genre: Soap opera
- Created by: Ryszard Chutkowski
- Written by: Ilona Łepkowska (Head writer)
- Starring: Teresa Lipowska; Małgorzata Pieńkowska; Dominika Ostałowska; Rafał Mroczek; Marcin Mroczek; Katarzyna Cichopek; Anna Mucha
- No. of episodes: 1966+5 special episodes (15 December 2026)

Production
- Executive producers: Ilona Łepkowska; Tadeusz Lampka
- Running time: 42 minutes

Original release
- Network: TVP2
- Release: 4 November 2000

L for Love (Polish: M jak miłość [ˈɛm jak ˈmiwɔɕt͡ɕ]) is a Polish soap opera, revolving around the multiple generations of the Mostowiak family. The series premiered on 4 November 2000 on TVP2, primarily as a weekly drama, and after one season shifted into a new timeslot and extended to two (and occasionally three) episodes per week. For the last few years the show has been the most watched drama on Polish television. Its popularity led to a Russian adaptation, entitled Love Is Love (Russian: Любовь как любовь, romanized: Lyubov kak Lyubov)
