= The Clan (TV series) =

Polish soap opera

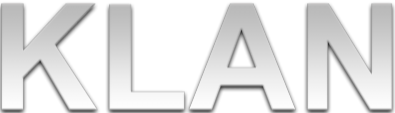
- Genre: Soap opera
- Created by: Paweł Karpiński
- Written by: Elżbieta Szczypek (Head writer)
- Starring: Barbara Bursztynowicz; Andrzej Grabarczyk; Izabela Trojanowska; Tomasz Stockinger; Paulina Holtz; Kaja Paschalska
- No. of seasons: 30
- No. of episodes: 4,770

Production
- Executive producer: Paweł Karpiński
- Running time: 24 minutes

Original release
- Network: TVP
- Release: 22 September 1997 – present

The Clan (Polish: Klan, Polish pronunciation: [ˈklan]) is a Polish soap opera that premiered on 22 September 1997 on the public TVP1 channel. With more than 4,600 episodes spanning 29 seasons, the show is the longest-running Polish TV series. It airs from Monday to Friday at 5.50 p.m. on TVP1. The series revolves around the fates of the multi-generation Lubicz family from Warsaw.

== Main cast members ==
Actor	Role	Status
Tomasz Bednarek	Jacek Borecki	1997–
Barbara Bursztynowicz	Elżbieta Chojnicka	1997–2025
Piotr Cyrwus	Ryszard Lubicz	1997–2012
Halina Dobrowolska	Maria Lubicz	1997–1999
Artur Dziurman	Leszek Jakubowski	1999–2000, 2007–
Andrzej Grabarczyk	Jerzy Chojnicki	1997–
Wincenty Grabarczyk	Jeremiasz Bałucki	2005–2018
Paulina Holtz	Agnieszka Lubicz	1997–
Agnieszka Kaczorowska	Bożena Kazuń (née Lubicz)	(#2) 1999–
Zygmunt Kęstowicz	Władysław Lubicz	1997–2007
Agnieszka Kotulanka	Krystyna Lubicz	1997–2013
Dorota Naruszewicz	Beata Borecka	(#1) 1997–2011
Małgorzata Ostrowska-Królikowska	Grażyna Lubicz	1997–
Kaja Paschalska	Ola Lubicz	1997–
Anna Powierza	Czesława Kurzawska	2000–2005, 2006–
Tomasz Stockinger	Dr Paweł Lubicz	1997–
Piotr Swend	Maciej Lubicz	1997–
Jakub Tolak	Daniel Ross	(#1) 1998–2008
Kazimiera Utrata-Lusztig	Stanisława Dorobczuk	1999, 2000–2018
Izabela Trojanowska	Monika Ross-Nowak	1997–
Jan Wieczorkowski	Michał Chojnicki	(#1) 1997–2004
Agnieszka Wosińska	Sister Dorota Lubicz	1997–2009, 2010
Małgorzata Wójcik	Beata Borecka	(#2) 2013–
Daniel Zawadzki	Michał Chojnicki	(#2) 2004–
Joanna Żółkowska	Anna Surmacz	1997–

== Recurring cast members ==
Actor	Role	Status
Julia Królikowska	Katarzyna Lubicz	1999–
Paweł Grządziel	Jan Rafalski	(#3) 2003–
Suzanna von Nathusius	Małgorzata Borecka	(#2) 2005–
Jacek Borkowski	Piotr Rafalski	1997–2003 (contract); 2003, 2004–
Jagoda Stach	Karolina Rafalska	1997–2001, 2003, 2006–2011
Maria Winiarska	Alicja Marczyńska	1998–2000 (contract); 2001–2015
Zofia Merle	Stefania Wróbel-Malec	1998–2013
Jerzy Bończak	Kazimierz Malec	2002–2010
Michalina Robakiewicz	Kamila Chojnicka (#1)	2003–2015
Mirosław Jękot	Antoni Zabużański	2000, 2001–
Renata Pękul	Renata Zabużańska	1999–2000, 2002–
Mariusz Krzemiński	Mariusz Kwarc	2005–
Jerzy Zelnik	Krzysztof Malicki	1997–1999, 2002, 2005, 2006–2007
Ewa Serwa-Galia	Matylda Szczęśniak	2002–2008
Dorota Kamińska	Jadwiga Dębińska	2013–
Grzegorz Wons	Leopold Kwapisz	2014–
Marek Kossakowski	Daniel Ross	(#2) 2015–
Martyna Kowalik	Kamila Chojnicka	(#2) 2015–
Natalia Rewieńska	Paulina Jezewska-Borecka	2019–

== Ratings history ==
During its early seasons Klan was the most popular television series in Poland. It won numerous awards for the best soap opera and best actors.

== Characters ==
- Władysław Lubicz (portrayed by Zygmunt Kęstowicz) - husband of Maria Lubicz, father of Paweł Lubicz, Elżbieta Chojnicka, Monika Ross-Nowak, Ryszard Lubicz and Dorota Lubicz, grandfather of Agnieszka Lubicz, Aleksandra Lubicz, Paweł Lubicz Jr., Beata Borecka, Michał Chojnicki, Daniel Ross, Katarzyna Lubicz and adopted grandfather of Maciej Lubicz and Bożena Lubicz. He lived in Warsaw with his wife and children but his family comes from Lvov, Ukraine. One of his great-grandchildren, Władysław Chojnicki, is named after him. He died in June 2007.
- Maria Lubicz, née Ziętecka (portrayed by Halina Dobrowolska) - wife of Władysław Lubicz, mother of Paweł Lubicz, Elżbieta Chojnicka, Monika Ross-Nowak, Ryszard Lubicz and Dorota Lubicz, grandmother of Agnieszka Lubicz, Aleksandra Lubicz, Paweł Lubicz Jr., Beata Borecka, Michał Chojnicki, Daniel Ross, Katarzyna Lubicz and adopted grandmother of Maciej Lubicz and Bożena Lubicz. She owned a pharmacy which is now owned by her daughter Elżbieta. Maria had one brother, Stefan Ziętecki. She died on 23 August 1999.
  - Elżbieta Chojnicka, née Lubicz (portrayed by Barbara Bursztynowicz) - daughter of Władysław Lubicz and Maria Lubicz, twin sister of Paweł Lubicz, older sister of Ryszard Lubicz, Monika Ross-Nowak and Dorota Lubicz, mother of Beata Borecka and Michał Chojnicki, grandmother of Jan Rafalski, Małgorzata Borecka, Antoni Chojnicki, Władysław Chojnicki and Stefan Chojnicki. She is married to Jerzy Chojnicki (they were divorced and then remarried) and owns a pharmacy called Pod Modrzewiem. She went abroad in 2025 and in 2026 she decided to divorce her husband.
  - Paweł Lubicz (portrayed by Tomasz Stockinger) - son of Władysław Lubicz and Maria Lubicz, twin brother of Elżbieta Chojnicka, older brother of Ryszard Lubicz, Monika Ross-Nowak and Dorota Lubicz, father of Agnieszka Lubicz, Aleksandra Lubicz and Paweł Lubicz Jr., grandfather of Zofia Lubicz, Julia Sokołowska and Filip Woźniacki. He was married to Krystyna Lubicz and works as a doctor in his private medical clinic El-Med. After his first wife died he got married with Jadwiga Dębińska.
  - Monika Ross-Nowak, de née Lubicz (portrayed by Izabela Trojanowska) - second daughter of Władysław Lubicz and Maria Lubicz, younger sister of Paweł Lubicz, Elżbieta Chojnicka, older sister of Ryszard Lubicz and Dorota Lubicz, mother of Daniel Ross. She was married to Bernard Ross who lived in the United States. After her son Daniel was born she escaped from her husband because he was very aggressive. They divorced and Bernard died later. Monika married again, to Wojciech Nawrot who was a doctor and was El-Med's co-owner. Wojciech died a few days after their wedding. She owns a restaurant called Rosso. She was engaged to Feliks Nowak, who is now her husband.
  - Ryszard Lubicz (portrayed by Piotr Cyrwus) - second son of Władysław Lubicz and Maria Lubicz, younger brother of Paweł Lubicz, Elżbieta Chojnicka, Monika Ross-Nowak and older brother of Dorota Lubicz, father of Katarzyna Lubicz, adopted father of Maciej Lubicz and Bożena Lubicz. He was married to Grażyna Lubicz. He died on 22 February 2012 after fatal fall.
  - Dorota Lubicz (portrayed by Agnieszka Wosińska) - third daughter and fifth child of Władysław Lubicz and Maria Lubicz, younger sister of Paweł Lubicz, Elżbieta Chojnicka, Ryszard Lubicz and Monika Ross-Nowak. She's a nun. Dorota graduated from medical school and is a doctor. She was engaged to a man who betrayed her with her sister Elżbieta. Dorota decided to become a nun and works in Warsaw, Głoskowo or in Africa. In December 2018, the family learns that she was killed in Africa.
  - Jerzy Chojnicki (portrayed by Andrzej Grabarczyk) - husband of Elżbieta Chojnicka, half-brother of Hanna Chojnicka, Oscar Chojnicki and Kamila Chojnicka, father of Beata Borecka and Michał Chojnicki, grandfather of Jan Rafalski, Małgorzata Borecka, Antoni Chojnicki, Władysław Chojnicki and Stefan Chojnicki.
  - Krystyna Lubicz, née Jakubowska (portrayed by Agnieszka Kotulanka) - wife of Paweł Lubicz, sister of Lech Jakubowski, mother of Agnieszka Lubicz, Aleksandra Lubicz and Paweł Lubicz Jr., grandmother of Zofia Lubicz, Julia Sokołowska and Filip Woźniacki. She died on 29 May 2014.
