= 2021 in Poland =

- Decades: 2000s; 2010s; 2020s
- See also: Other events of 2021; Timeline of Polish history

Events in the year 2021 in Poland.

The Sejm assigned several patrons for year of 2021, so that 2021 is to be known as the Stanisław Lem Year, Stefan Wyszyński Year, Cyprian Norwid Year, Krzysztof Kamil Baczyński Year, Tadeusz Różewicz Year, as well as the Constitution of 3 May Year in Poland.

== Incumbents ==
- President: Andrzej Duda
- Prime Minister: Mateusz Morawiecki
- Marshal of the Sejm: Elżbieta Witek
- Marshal of the Senate: Tomasz Grodzki

== Events ==
Ongoing — COVID-19 pandemic in Poland

=== January ===
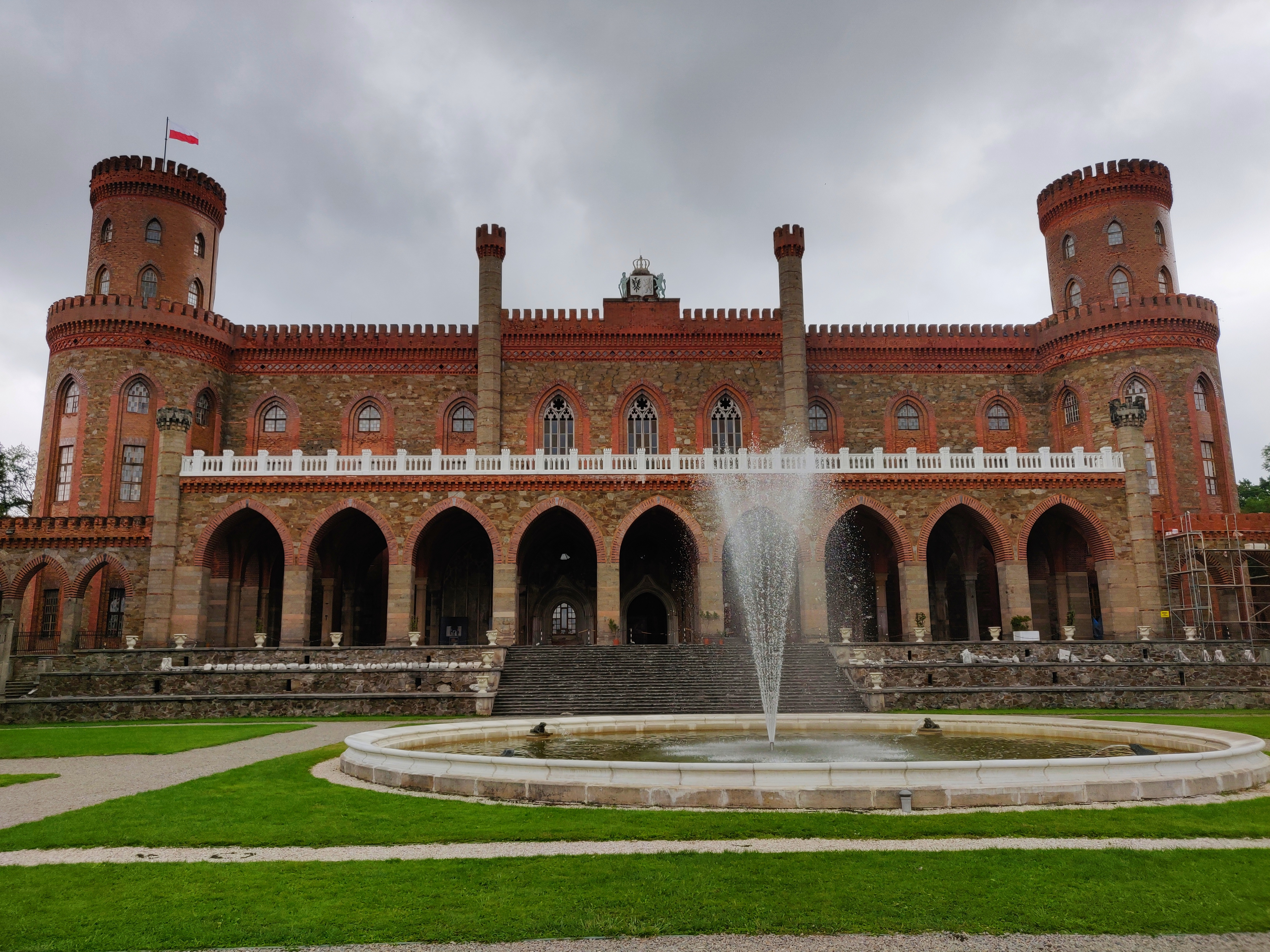
Palace in Kamieniec Ząbkowicki in 2021

- 1 January — Ten villages were granted town rights: Budzyń, Dubiecko, Goraj, Kamieniec Ząbkowicki, Kamionka, Koźminek, Sochocin, Solec nad Wisłą, Wiskitki, and Wodzisław.
- 6 January — Changes were made in the Chancellery of the President of the Republic of Poland. Piotr Ćwik succeeded Paweł Mucha as Chief of the Chancellery. The following day Paweł Szrot was appointed Chief of the Cabinet, replacing Krzysztof Szczerski.
- 27 January — The Constitutional Tribunal's ruling stating that termination of pregnancy for fetal defects is unconstitutional was published in the Journal of Laws.

=== February ===
- 10 February — Several TV channels, radio stations, and web portals went off air in protest of a tax on advertising revenue proposed by the Ministry of Finance.

=== April ===
- 1 April — Start of the Polish Census 2021.
- 14 April — The Constitutional Tribunal ruled paragraph 3 of Article 6 of the Act on the Commissioner for Human Rights, which allowed the Commissioner to remain in office until another one takes up the position, to be unconstitutional. The Tribunal decided that the current Commissioner, Adam Bodnar, who had remained in office as the Sejm and the Senate could not decide on a successor, had to vacate his post in three months' time.
- 18 April – Jastrzębski Węgiel won their second Polish Volleyball Championship defeating ZAKSA Kędzierzyn-Koźle in the finals (see 2020–21 PlusLiga).

=== May ===
- 6 May – Stal Ostrów Wielkopolski won their first Polish Basketball Championship defeating Zastal Zielona Góra in the finals (see 2020–21 PLK season).
- 28 May — The conservative university Collegium Intermarium is inaugurated by Ordo Iuris, an ultra-conservative Polish think tank known for its anti-LGBT activism and opposition to abortion

=== June ===
- 13 June — The city of Rzeszów holds a special election for the vacated office of President (Mayor) of the city. Konrad Fijołek, the joint candidate of the liberal-left opposition parties (KO, P2050, L, KP), is elected with 56% of the vote, behind by three right-wing candidates (supported by PiS, SP-P-K15, and Confederation respectively).
- 27 June — Poland enacts a law setting a 30-year time limit on appealing administrative decisions made by special administrative bodies, effectively meaning that owners of property seized in the communist era can no longer receive compensation. The law sparked a diplomatic incident with Israel. Israel's Foreign Minister Yair Lapid described as the bill as "immoral and a disgrace." Polish Prime Minister Mateusz Morawiecki said "I can only say that as long as I am the prime minister, Poland will not pay for German crimes: Neither zloty, nor euro, nor dollar."

=== July ===
- 14 July — The Constitutional Tribunal rules that any interim measures from the top European court against Poland's judicial reforms were "not in line" with the Polish constitution. the Polish justice minister, Zbigniew Ziobro, said the constitutional court’s decision was "against interference, usurpation and legal aggression by organs of the European Union".

=== August ===
- 12 August - Polish members of parliament pass controversial media bill which restricts foreign ownership of media broadcasts.
- 14 August - Poland’s President Andrzej Duda signed the restitution law. In response, Israel recalled its envoy from Poland and told the Polish ambassador not to return. Nevertheless, Poland returned its envoy to Israel in July 2022 as a sign of rapprochement in bilateral relations.

=== September ===
- 2 September – A state of emergency is declared in various localities in eastern Poland by President Andrzej Duda due to the 2021–2022 Belarus–European Union border crisis.
- September 6 — the European Commission sent letters to several Polish regional councils indicating that EU funds would be withdrawn if they do not abandon their LGBT-free zone policy.
- 26 September – Sparta Wrocław won their fifth Team Speedway Polish Championship defeating Motor Lublin in the finals (see 2021 Polish speedway season).

=== October ===
- October 7 — The Constitutional Tribunal rules that some articles in EU treaties are "incompatible" with its national legislation and unconstitutional. it also ruled that Poland’s constitution takes precedence over some EU laws.

=== December ===
- 18 December – Polish members of parliament finally pass a controversial media bill which restricts foreign ownership of media broadcasts. This time it must next be signed by Polish President Andrzej Duda to go into effect.
- 23 December – Revelations are made by Associated Press that the Israeli Pegasus spy hardware was used to target the devices of multiple opposition figures, before, on, and after the 2019 European and parliamentary elections, including the opposition coalition's campaign manager.
- 24 December – PiS party leader and Deputy Prime Minister Jarosław Kaczyński publicly opposes the German goal of a federal Europe expressed by the oncoming Scholz cabinet's coalition agreement (entitled "Mehr Fortschritt wagen"), saying Germany seeks to create a "Fourth Reich", which "we shall not allow".
- 27 December – Duda vetoes the Lex TVN bill, a government bill to counter foreign ownership in Polish media.

=== Scheduled/predicted events ===
- Varso in Warsaw, the tallest building in Warsaw and Poland and in the European Union, projected for completion.
- Gas Interconnection Poland–Lithuania projected to be ready for operation by the end of the year.

== Holidays ==
- 1 January - New Year's Day
- 6 January - Epiphany
- 4 April - Easter Sunday
- 5 April - Easter Monday
- 1 May - May Day
- 3 May - 3 May Constitution Day
- 23 May - Whit Sunday
- 3 June - Corpus Christi
- 15 August - Assumption Day
- 1 November - All Saints' Day

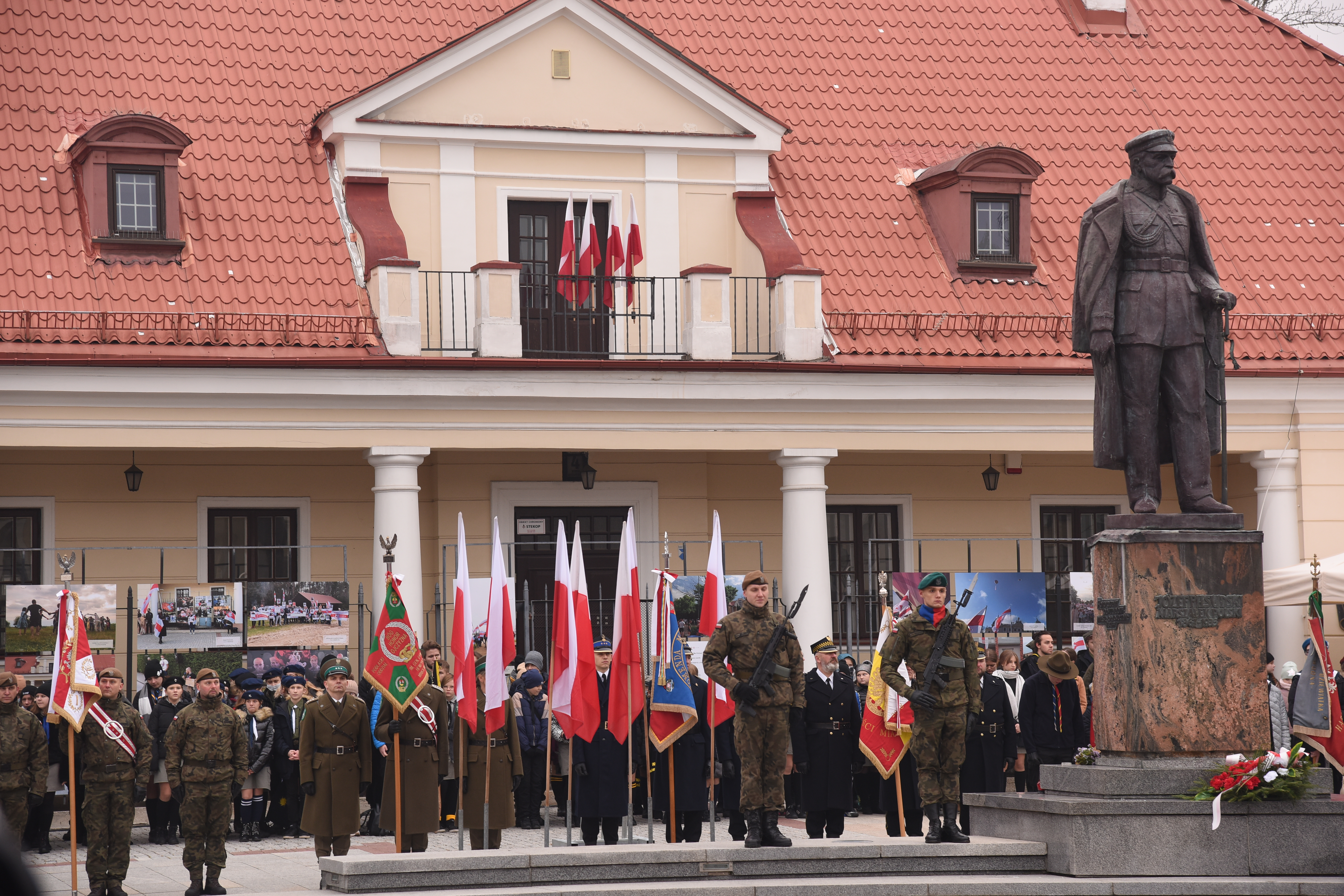
2021 Independence Day in Białystok

- 11 November - Independence Day
- 25 December - Christmas Day
- 26 December – 2nd Day of Christmas

== Deaths ==
=== January ===
- 4 January — Antoni Stankiewicz, Roman Catholic bishop, Dean of Roman Rota (b. 1935).
- 8 January — Wojciech Przybylski, football player and manager, sports and political activist (b. 1939).
- 10 January
  - Adam Dyczkowski, Roman Catholic bishop (b. 1932).
  - Gothard Kokott, football player and manager (b. 1943).
- 28 January
  - Henryk Ostrowski, politician (b. 1960).
  - Maria Koterbska, singer (b. 1924).
- 21 January — Henryk "Papcio Chmiel" Chmielewski, comic book artist and journalist (b. 1923).
- 24 January
  - Franciszek Kokot, nephrologist and endocrinologist (b. 1929).
  - Urszula Plenkiewicz, scout and liaison officer (b. 1921).
- 28 January — Ryszard Kotys, actor (b. 1932).
- 30 January — Alfreda Markowska, Polish-Romani woman who during World War II saved approximately fifty Jewish and Roma children from death in the Holocaust and the Porajmos genocide (b. 1926).
- 31 January — Andrzej Kossakowski, theoretical physicist, professor at the Nicolaus Copernicus University (b. 1938).

=== February ===
- 1 February — Ryszard Szurkowski, road bicycle racer (b. 1946).
- 2 February — Edward Babiuch, Polish Communist politician, 50th Prime Minister of Poland (b. 1927).
- 6 February — Krzysztof Kowalewski, actor and comedian (b. 1937).
- 8 February
  - Adam Kopczyński, former ice hockey player (b. 1948).
  - Michał Szewczyk, actor (b. 1934).
- 13 February — Bolesław Kwiatkowski, basketball player (b. 1942).
- 15 February — Zdzisław Najder, literary historian and political activist (b. 1930).
- 21 February — Jan Lityński, politician and journalist (b. 1946).
- 22 February — Aleksander Doba, kayaker (b. 1946).
- 23 February — Jerzy Dietl, economist and politician (b. 1927).
- 24 February — Alicja Helman, musicologist (b. 1935).
- 25 February — Halina Wołłowicz, activist and resistance fighter (b. 1927)

=== March ===
- 1 March — Helena Pietraszkiewicz, psychologist and politician (b. 1953).
- 2 March — Czesław Baran, politician and agronomist (b. 1937).
- 3 March — Władysław Baka, economist, banker and politician (b. 1936).
- 4 March — Zygmunt Hanusik, Olympic cyclist (b. 1945).
- 5 March — Jerzy Boniecki, Olympic swimmer (b. 1933).
- 7 March — Wiesław Bocheński, Olympic wrestler (b. 1944).
- 10 March — Henryk Rozmiarek, Olympic handball player (b. 1949).
- 21 March — Adam Zagajewski, poet and writer (b. 1945).
- 22 March — Alojzy Łysko, football player and coach (b. 1935).
- 24 March — Anna Koźmińska, World War II heroine and Righteous Among the Nations (b. 1919).
- 25 March
  - Jan Waszkiewicz, mathematician and politician, former marshal of the Lower Silesian Voivodeship (b. 1944).
  - Roman Micał, field hockey player (b. 1939).
- 31 March
  - Izabella Sierakowska, politician, elected to the Contract Sejm (b. 1946).
  - Teresa Siemieniewska, chemist, awarded the Order of Polonia Restituta (b. 1931).

=== April ===
- 2 April — Marek Czekalski, politician and engineer, former mayor of Łódź (b. 1953).
- 3 April — Danuta Budniak, philologist (b. 1938).
- 4 April — Zygmunt Malanowicz, actor (b. 1938).
- 5 April — Krzysztof Krawczyk, pop singer, guitarist, and composer (b. 1946).
- 6 April — Anna Wasilewska, politician (b. 1958).
- 7 April — Lucyna Mirosława Falkowska, oceanographer (b. 1951).
- 14 April — Ewa Wawrzoń, actress (b. 1937).
- 16 April — Grażyna Leja, politician, former Undersecretary of State in the Ministry of Sport and Tourism (b. 1954).
- 18 April
  - Regina Pawłowska, philologist and linguist (b. 1935).
  - Stefan Bratkowski, journalist, writer, and lawyer, opposition activist in the Polish People's Republic (b. 1934).
- 19 April — Andrzej Białynicki-Birula, mathematician, member of the Polish Academy of Sciences (b. 1935).
- 20 April
  - Aleksander Sopliński, politician, former Undersecretary of State in the Ministry of Health (b. 1942).
  - Janina Suchorzewska, anaesthesiologist, Warsaw Uprising participant (b. 1930).
  - Wiesława Mazurkiewicz, film and theater actress (b. 1926).
- 21 April
  - Aleksandra Karzyńska, actress (b. 1927).
  - Marian Kosiński, football player and coach (b. 1945).
  - Wojciech Ziemba, Roman Catholic archbishop (b. 1941).
- 22 April
  - Krystyna Łyczywek, journalist, translator, philologist, and photographer (b. 1920).
  - Mirosław Handke, chemist and politician (b. 1946).
- 27 April — Jan Gałecki, Roman Catholic titular and auxiliary bishop (b. 1932).
- 29 April — Kazimierz Kord, conductor (b. 1930).

=== May ===
- 1 May — Andrzej Możejko, football player (b. 1949).
- 2 May — Bronisław Cieślak, actor, journalist, politician, and TV presenter (b. 1943).
- 5 May
  - Bożena Bednarek-Michalska, academic teacher and librarian, certified curator at the NCUL (b. 1957).
  - Edward Pietrzyk, general in the Polish Army, ambassador to Iraq and to North Korea (b. 1949).
- 8 May — Jacek Starościak, politician, former mayor of Gdańsk (b. 1961).
