= Marek Dzida =

Polish professor (born 1953)

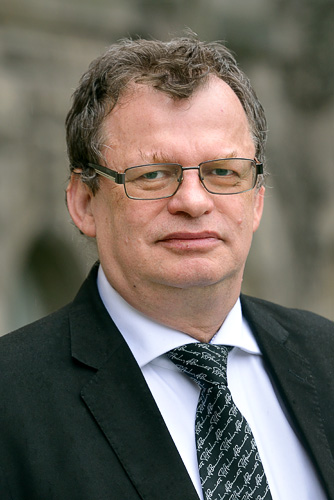
- Dzida in 2016
- Born: 6 August 1953 (age 73); Bielsko-Biała, Poland
- Education: Gdańsk University of Technology
- Scientific career
- Fields: Auto regulation of gas turbines in marine propulsion and power generation, auto regulation of frequency and power in electric power systems, identification and diagnosis of turbine sets, automatic control of vessels, and the structures of blocks of power systems of combined gas-steam and wind turbines
- Workplaces: Gdańsk University of Technology

Marek Władysław Dzida (born 6 August 1953) is a Polish professor of Gdańsk University of Technology. His fields of interest are Mechanical Engineering and Operation, and Power Engineering.

== Education ==
Dzida is a graduate of the Institute of Shipbuilding at Gdańsk University of Technology (GUT). Since 1978 he has been working at Faculty of Ocean Engineering and Ship Technology at GUT. In 1983 he received the title of Doctor of Technical Sciences, and in 2000 – the title of Doctor with habilitation. He is currently employed as associate professor at GUT.

== Career ==
Dzida worked as vice-dean for Education (1996–2002) and as dean (2005–2012) at the Faculty of Ocean Engineering and Ship Technology. Since 2010 he has been the head of the Department of Automatics And Turbine Propulsion, Faculty of Ocean Engineering And Ship Technology, Gdańsk University of Technology. Since 2012, he has been working as vice-rector for Education.

Since 2002, Dzida has been a member of the GUT Senate; was a member of the Senate Committee on Education from 1996 to 2002, and since 2008 has been its chairman twice. Director of postgraduate studies at the Faculty of Ocean Engineering and ShipTechnology. Editor of "Scientific Notebooks" (Zeszyty Naukowe) series "Marine Construction" (2002–2005). Member of the Scientific Council of the Ship Design and Research Centre in Gdansk (2007–2010). Member and expert of the Evaluation Team for the Mechanical Engineering Accreditation Commission of Technical Universities and expert of Polish Accreditation Commission. Member of the Section of Fundamentals of Machine Operation of the Committee of Machine Construction of the Polish Academy of Sciences, Section of Technical Means of Transport of the Transport Committee of the Polish Academy of Sciences, of the Council of the National Maritime Museum and of the Society of Friends of the Ship-Museum Sołdek. Member of the Ship Forum (Employers in the Shipbuilding Industry) - Vice-president from 2007 to 2012. Member of the Technical Board of the Polish Register of Shipping, Lloyd's Register (Poland) and Gdańsk Scientific Society.
