= GTN =

GTN may refer to:

- Gas Transmission Northwest
- Gdańsk Scientific Society (Polish: Gdańskie Towarzystwo Naukowe)
- Gestational trophoblastic neoplasia
- Glentanner Aerodrome, in New Zealand
- Global Traffic Network, a traffic reporting service
- Glyceryl trinitrate
- Grangetown railway station, in Wales
- Gray Television, an American broadcaster
- Greater Talent Network, an American speakers bureau
- Guardian Television Network, in Columbus, Ohio
- Global Television Network
