= 2019 in Poland =

- Decades: 1990s; 2000s; 2010s; 2020s
- See also: Other events of 2019; Timeline of Polish history

Events of 2019 in Poland.

== Incumbents ==
- President – Andrzej Duda (independent, supported by Law and Justice)
- Prime Minister – Mateusz Morawiecki (Law and Justice)
- Marshal of the Sejm – Marek Kuchciński (Law and Justice) (until 9 August), Elżbieta Witek (Law and Justice) (since 9 August)
- Marshal of the Senate – Stanisław Karczewski (Law and Justice) (until 11 November), Tomasz Grodzki (Civic Platform) (since 12 November)

== Events ==
=== January ===
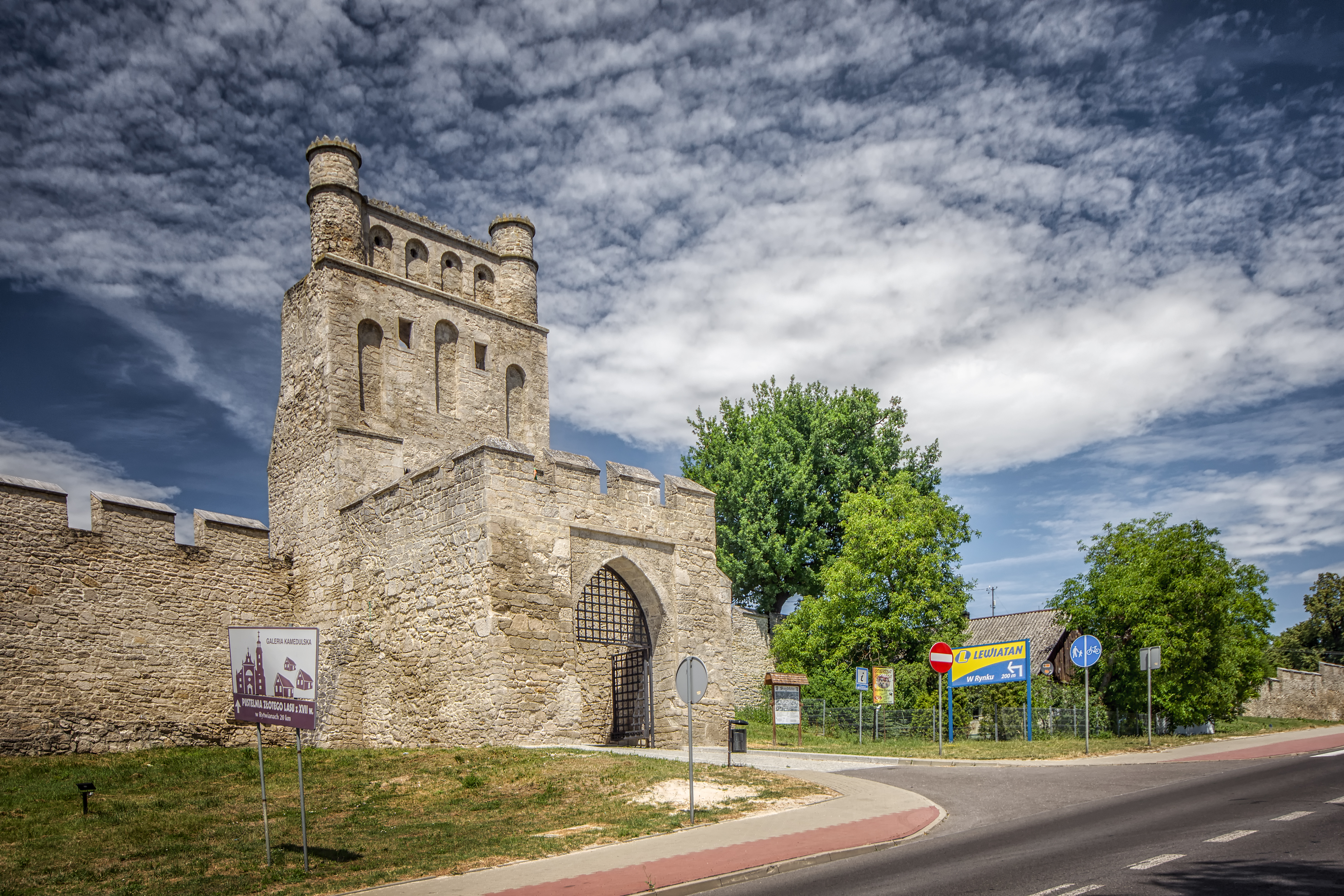
Medieval entrance gate and town walls of Szydłów in 2019

- January 1 — Town rights were restored to ten localities: Koszyce, Lubowidz, Nowa Słupia, Nowy Korczyn, Oleśnica, Opatowiec, Pacanów, Pierzchnica, Szydłów, and Wielbark.
- January 4 – Koszalin escape room fire
- January 13 – Paweł Adamowicz, the mayor of Gdańsk, is stabbed during a live charity event in Gdańsk by a former inmate, who was released from prison a month prior to the assassination. Adamowicz dies the following day from his injuries, at the age of 53.

=== March ===
- March – the town of Świdnik in eastern Poland passed a resolution rejecting "LGBT ideology".

=== April ===
- April 1 — Priests in Gdańsk burn Harry Potter books.
- April 8 — Polish teachers began a strike initiated by Polish Teachers' Union
- April 22 — Pruchnik was condemned by the World Jewish Congress for doing the Burning of Judas.

=== May ===
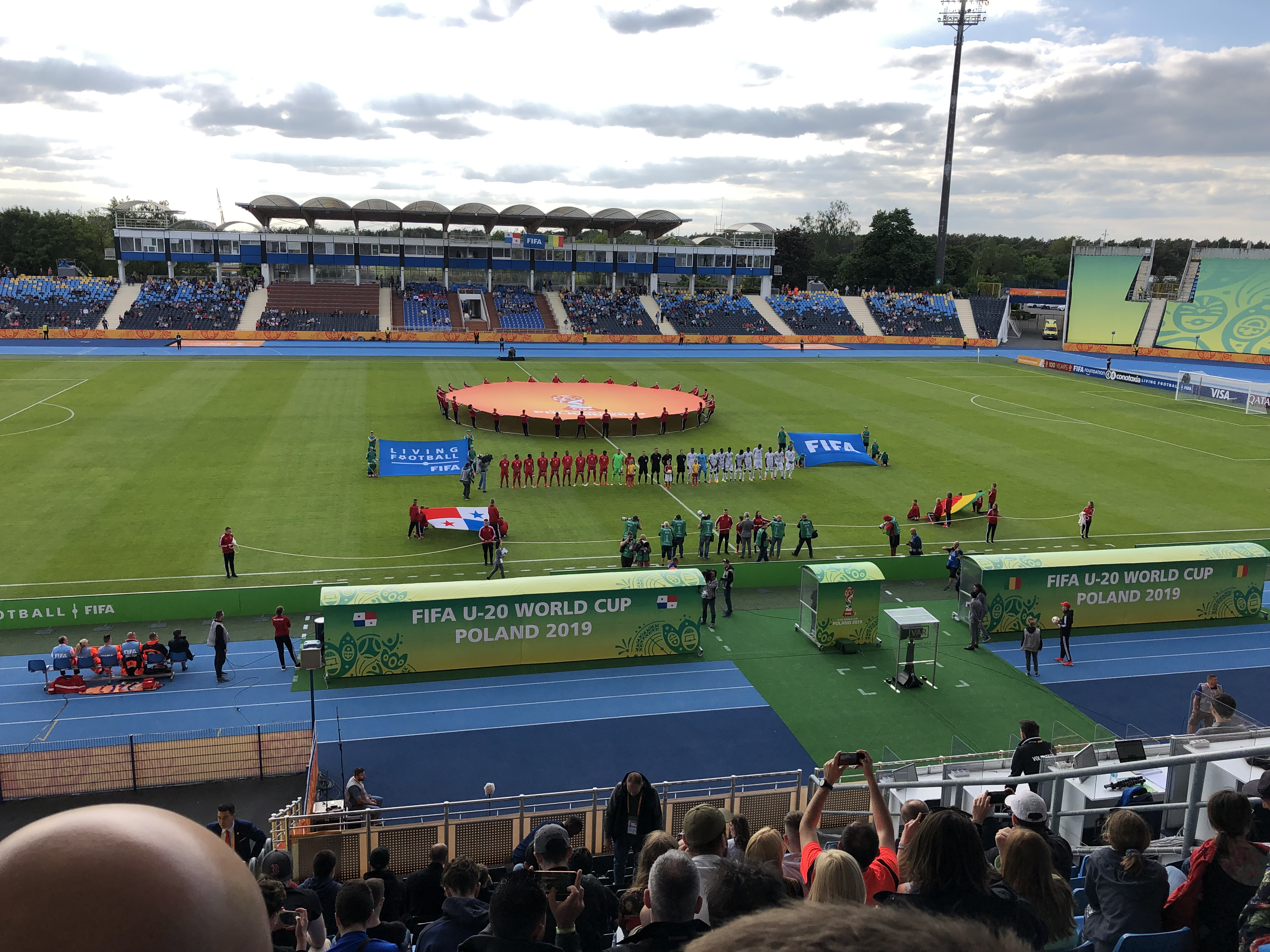
Panama v Mali match in the 2019 FIFA U-20 World Cup in Bydgoszcz, 25 May 2019

- 23 May – 15 June – The 2019 FIFA U-20 World Cup took place

=== June ===
- 14 June – Anwil Włocławek won their third Polish Basketball Championship defeating Polski Cukier Toruń in the finals (see 2018–19 PLK season).

=== July ===
- 20 July: Białystok equality march attacked by thousands of members of far-right groups, hooligan football fans, and others. The New York Times, compared the publish shock to the reaction to the Unite the Right rally in Charlottesville.

=== August ===
- August: the Archbishop of Kraków Marek Jędraszewski said the "LGBT ideology" were like a "rainbow plague" in a sermon commemorating the Warsaw Uprising.

=== October ===
- 13 October: The governing Law and Justice (PiS) government wins Reelection, with an increased popular vote of 43%, the highest vote share by any party since Poland returned to democracy in 1989.

=== September ===
- 22 September: Unia Leszno won their 17th Team Speedway Polish Championship defeating Sparta Wrocław in the finals (see 2019 Polish speedway season).

=== November ===
- 24 November: Junior Eurovision Song Contest 2019 is held in Gliwice. Poland's representative, Viki Gabor, also wins the event, making Poland the first country to win the competition twice in a row and the first host nation to win.

=== December ===
- 20 December: The governing Law and Justice (PiS) government passes the Polish Supreme Court Disciplinary Chamber law

== Holidays ==
- 1 January - New Year's Day
- 6 January - Epiphany
- 21 April - Easter Sunday
- 22 April - Easter Monday
- 1 May - May Day
- 3 May - 3 May Constitution Day
- 9 Jun - Whit Sunday
- 20 June - Corpus Christi
- 15 August - Assumption Day
- 1 November - All Saints' Day

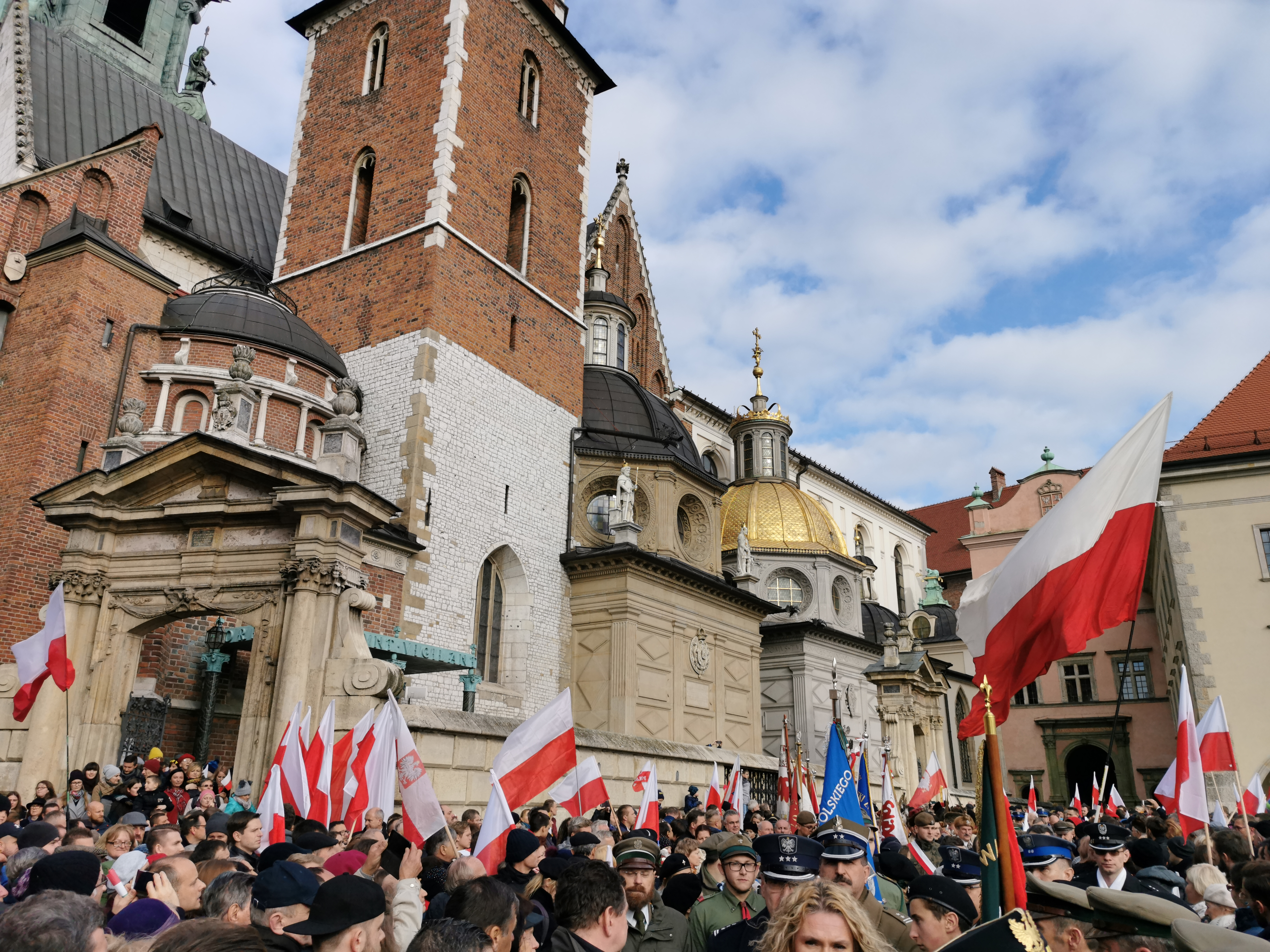
2019 Independence Day in Kraków

- 11 November - Independence Day
- 25 December - Christmas Day
- 26 December – 2nd Day of Christmas

== Deaths ==
=== January ===
- 14 January – Paweł Adamowicz, mayor of Gdańsk (b. 1965).

=== February ===
- 1 February – Bożena Aksamit, Journalist (b. 1966)

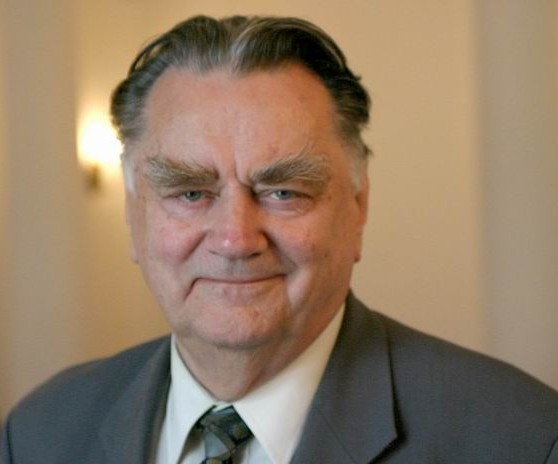
Jan Olszewski

- 7 February – Jan Olszewski, 3rd Prime Minister of Poland (b. 1930)

=== March ===
- 23 March – Maria Iwaszkiewicz, writer (b. 1924)

=== April ===
- 17 April – Ryszard Kaja, stage designer (b. 1962)

=== June ===
- 7 June – Ryszard Bugajski, film director (b. 1943)
- 17 June – Zbigniew Horbowy, glassware designer (b. 1935)

=== July ===
- 8 July – Natalia Rolleczek, writer (b. 1919)
- 20 July – Wiktor Jędrzejec, graphic designer, (b. 1961)

=== August ===
- 6 August – Krystyna Dańko, humanitarian (b. 1917)
- 18 August – Andrzej Buszewicz, actor (b. 1934)

=== September ===
- 18 September – Leszek Elektorowicz, poet (b. 1924)
- 28 September Jan Kobuszewski, actor (b. 1934)

=== October ===
- 14 October – Bohdan Butenko, cartoonist (b. 1931)
- 20 October – Andrzej Heidrich, graphic artist (b. 1928)

== See also ==
- 2019 European Parliament election
