= 2020 in Poland =

- Decades: 2000s; 2010s; 2020s
- See also: Other events of 2020; Timeline of Polish history

Events during the year 2020 in Poland.

== Incumbents ==
- President: Andrzej Duda
- Prime Minister: Mateusz Morawiecki
- Marshal of the Sejm: Elżbieta Witek
- Marshal of the Senate: Tomasz Grodzki

== Events ==
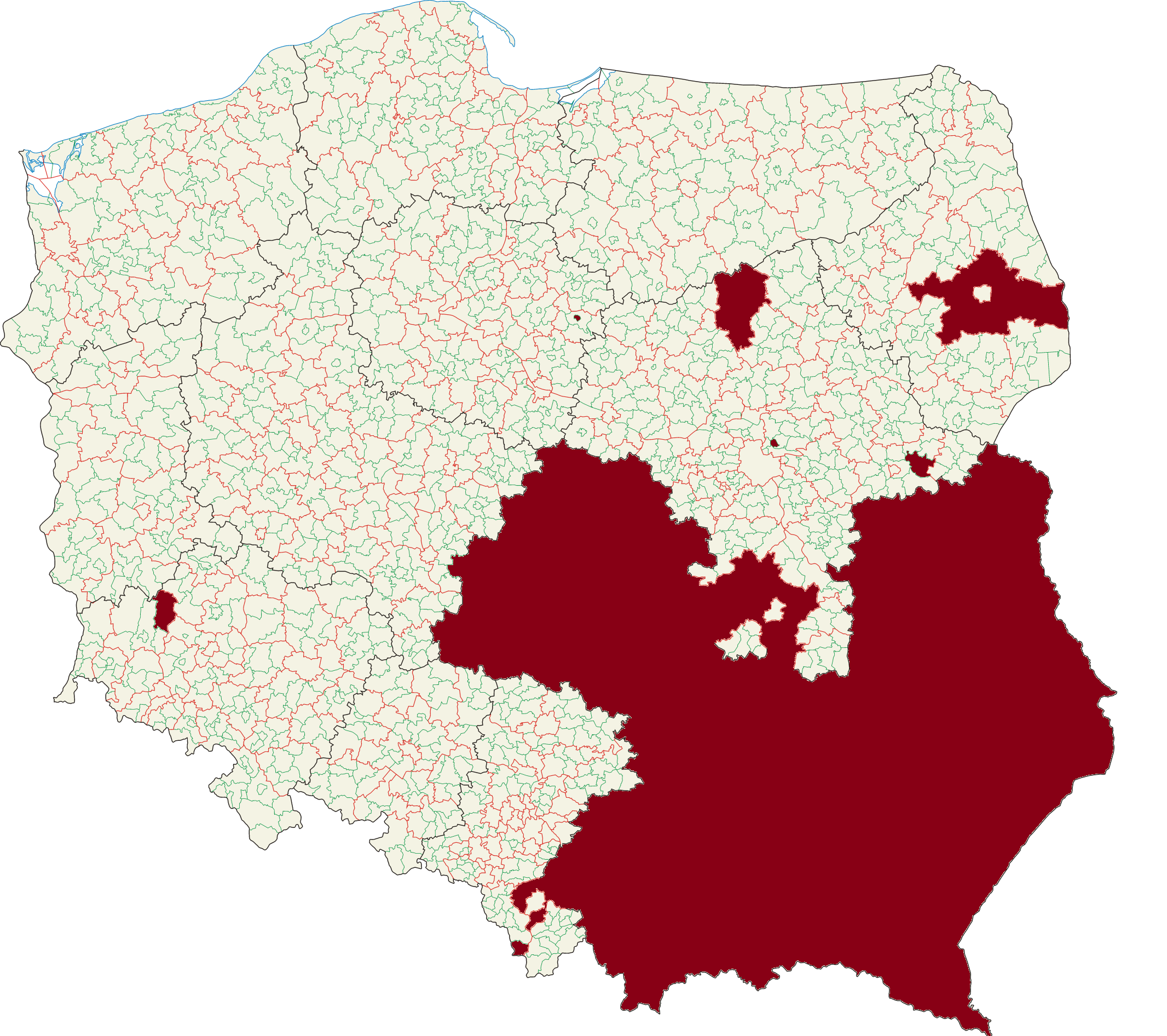
Voivodeships, powiats, and gminas marked in red had passed anti-LGBT resolutions by January 2020.

- 1 January – Town rights of Czerwińsk nad Wisłą, Klimontów, Lututów and Piątek were restored.
- February — local governments controlling a third of Poland officially declared themselves as "against "LGBT ideology" or passed "pro-family" Charters, pledging to refrain from encouraging tolerance or funding NGOs working for LGBT rights.
- 4 March — First lab-confirmed case of COVID-19 in Poland involving a patient from Cybinka. Start of the COVID-19 pandemic in Poland.
- 18 March – Stelmet Zielona Góra won their fifth Polish Basketball Championship (see 2019–20 PLK season).
- 23 March – Vive Kielce won their 17th Polish Handball Championship (see 2019–20 Superliga).
- 6 July – President Duda signed a document with a presidential draft of the amendment to the Polish Constitution to ban gay adoption.
- 11 July – Legia Warsaw won their 14th Polish Football Championship (see 2019–20 Ekstraklasa).
- 12 July – Andrzej Duda is re-elected as the President of Poland.
- 25 July – Minister of Justice Zbigniew Ziobro declared he would begin preparing the formal process for Poland to withdraw from the Istanbul Convention. He claimed the treaty is harmful because it "requires that schools teach children about gender in an ideological way" and that it "de-emphasizes biological sex".
- 29 July - EU Commissioner Dalli announced that applications for EU-funded town twinnings from six Polish towns had been rejected because of their adoption of "LGBT-free" or "family rights" resolutions.
- 18 August - Justice Minister Zbigniew Ziobro announce that the town of Tuchów in southern Poland would now receive 250,000 zlotys ($67,800) from the ministry's Justice Fund, to compensate for the EU funding reversal for its support for LGBT-free zone.
- 6 October – Jarosław Kaczyński become deputy prime minister in the Mateusz Morawiecki government.
- 11 October – Unia Leszno won their 18th Team Speedway Polish Championship defeating Stal Gorzów Wielkopolski in the finals (see 2020 Polish speedway season).
- 22 October – Poland's constitutional court rules abortion of fetuses with congenital defects is unconstitutional.

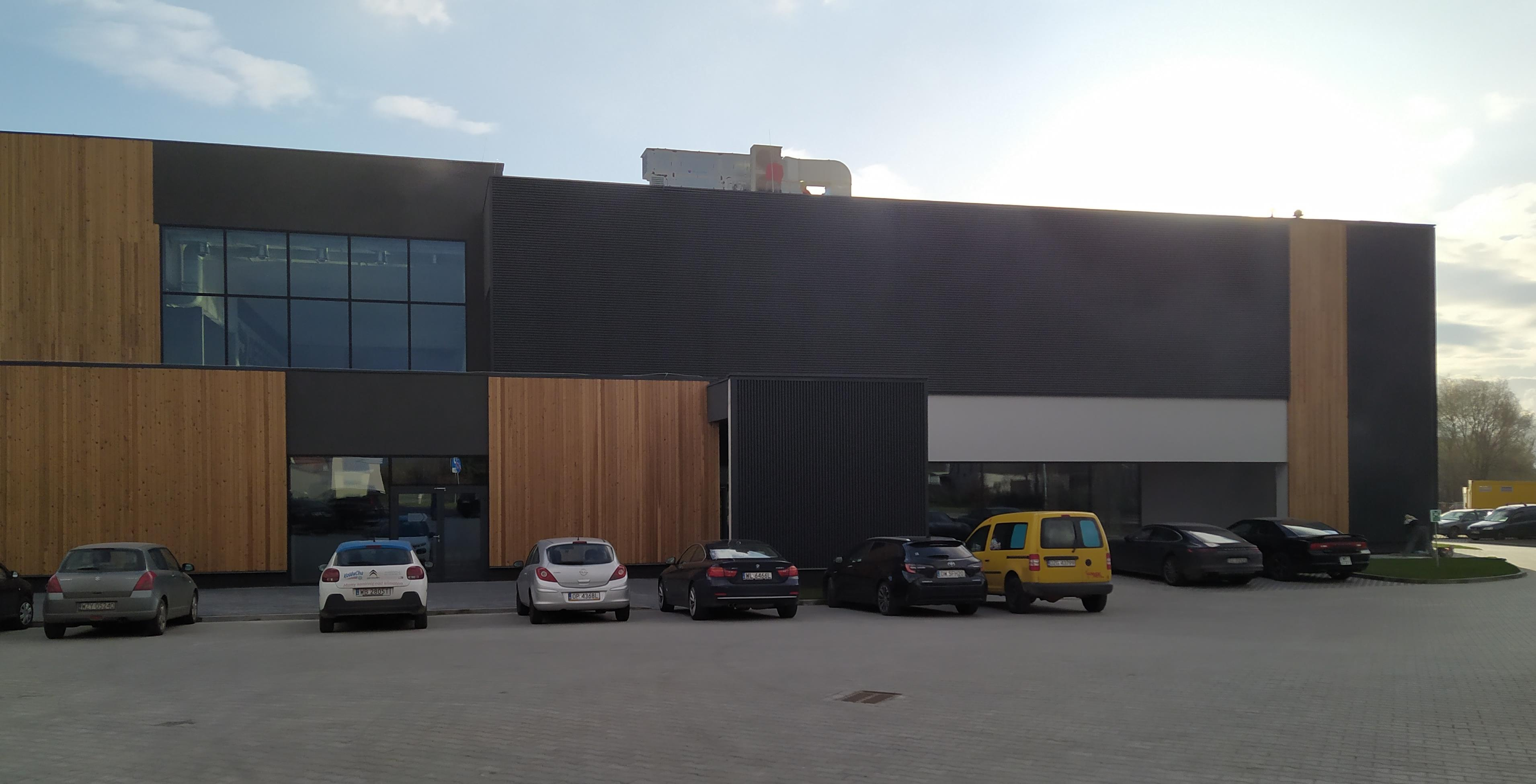
Deepspot shortly after opening

- 16 November – Hungary and Poland veto the seven-year EU budget, over attempts to link funding to respect for rule of law. They both said that linking funding to rule of law will mean a loss to their nation's sovereignty.
- 21 November – Deepspot, the deepest swimming pool in the world at that time, opens in Mszczonów.
- 7 December – stated-owned petroleum refinery and distributor PKN Orlen acquired media and press company "Polska Press" controlling large number of regional media portals and several regional newspapers.
- 10 December – Hungary and Poland drop their veto on the EU budget linked to rule of law conditionality.

== Holidays ==
- 1 January - New Year's Day
- 6 January - Epiphany
- 12 April - Easter Sunday
- 13 April - Easter Monday
- 1 May - May Day
- 3 May - 3 May Constitution Day
- 31 May - Whit Sunday
- 11 June - Corpus Christi

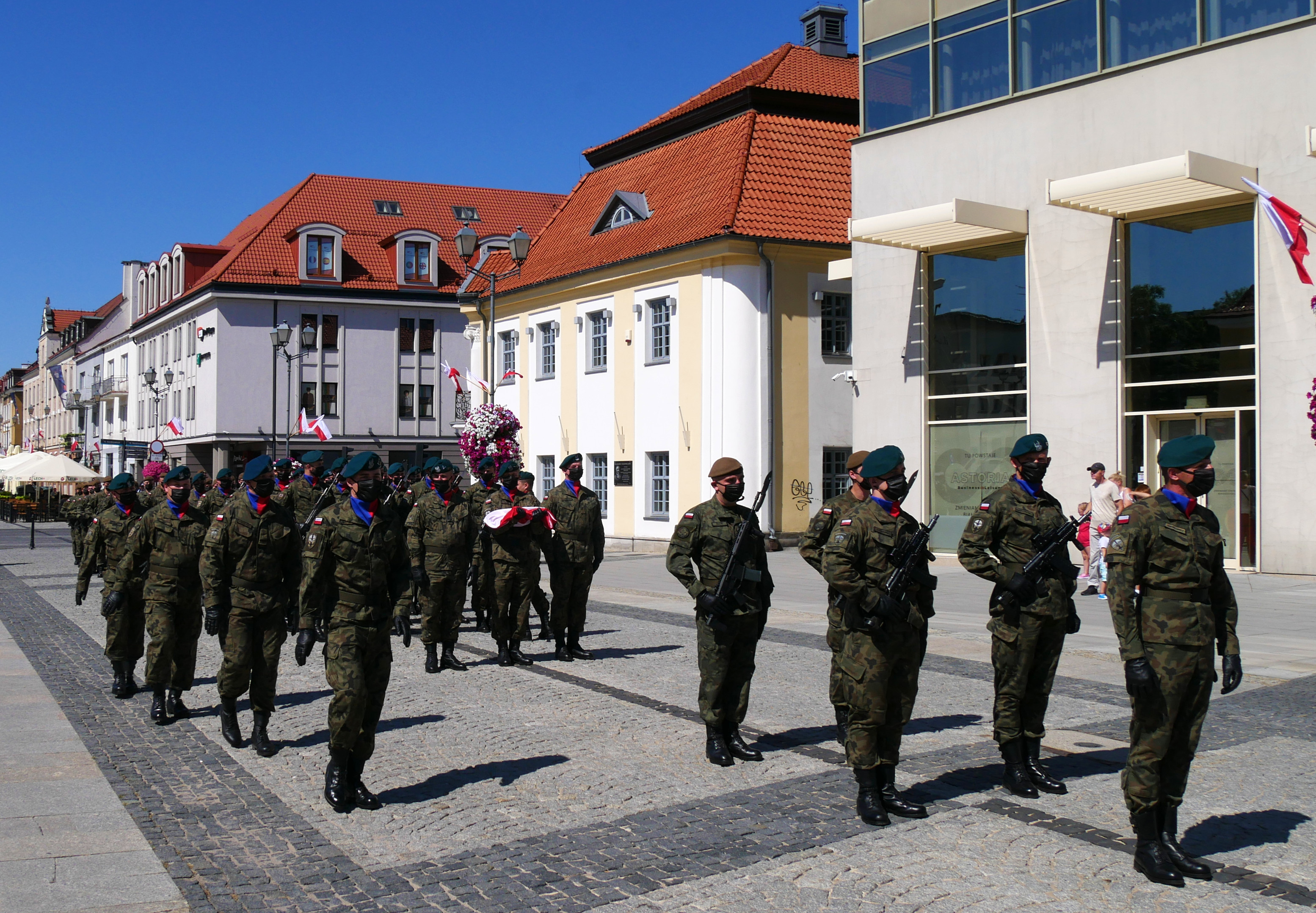
2020 Armed Forces Day in Białystok

- 15 August - Assumption Day (and Armed Forces Day)
- 1 November - All Saints' Day
- 11 November - Independence Day
- 25 December - Christmas Day
- 26 December – 2nd Day of Christmas

== Deaths ==
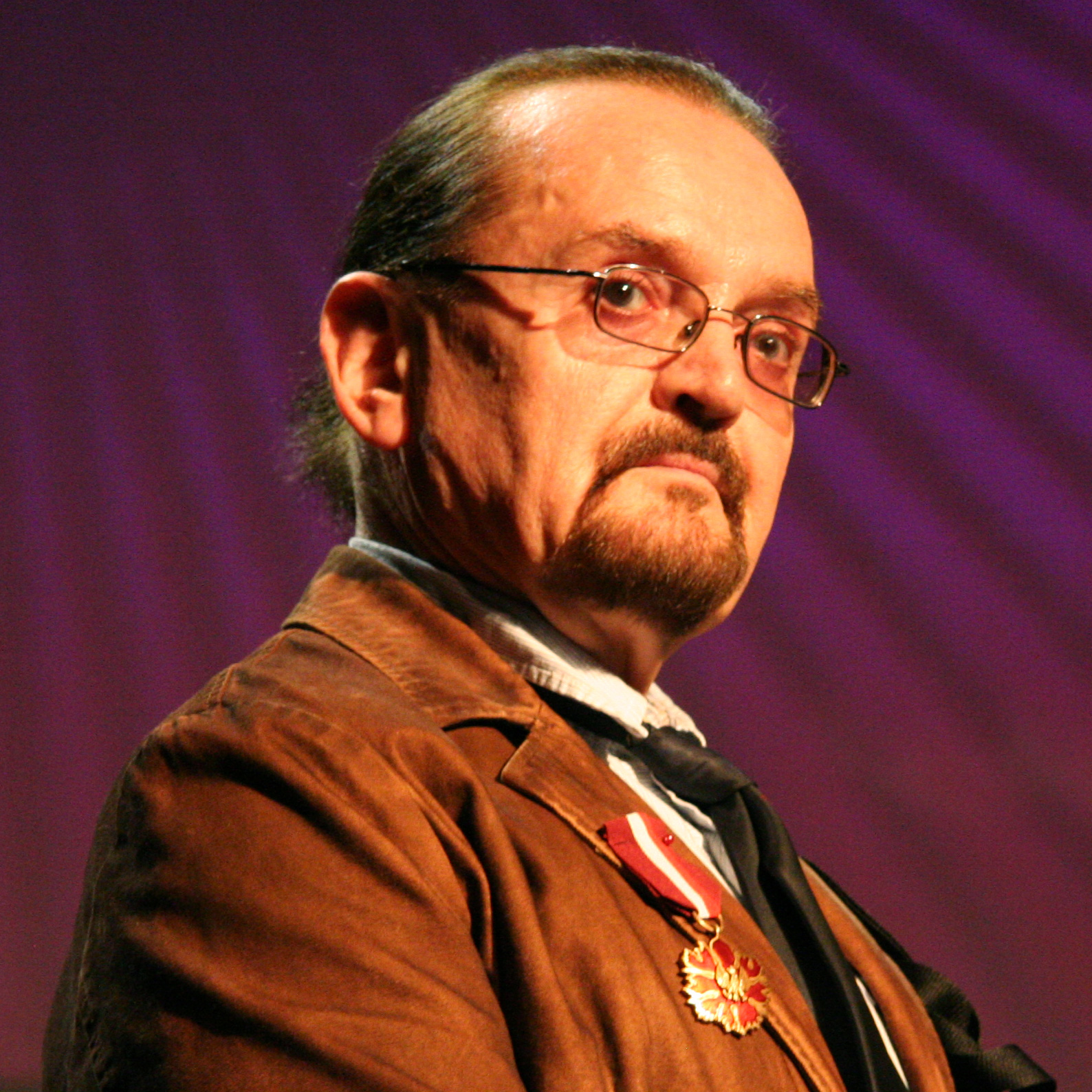
Bogusław Polch

=== January ===
- 2 January – Bogusław Polch, comic book artist (b. 1941).
- 17 January
  - Lech Raczak, theatre director (b. 1946).
  - Stanislaw Stefanek, Roman Catholic prelate, Bishop of Łomża (b. 1936).

=== July ===
- 6 July
  - Zdzisław Myrda, Olympic basketball player (b. 1951).
  - Marta Stebnicka, actress (b. 1925).
- 10 July – Anna Stroka, literary historian, author and translator (b. 1923).

=== August ===
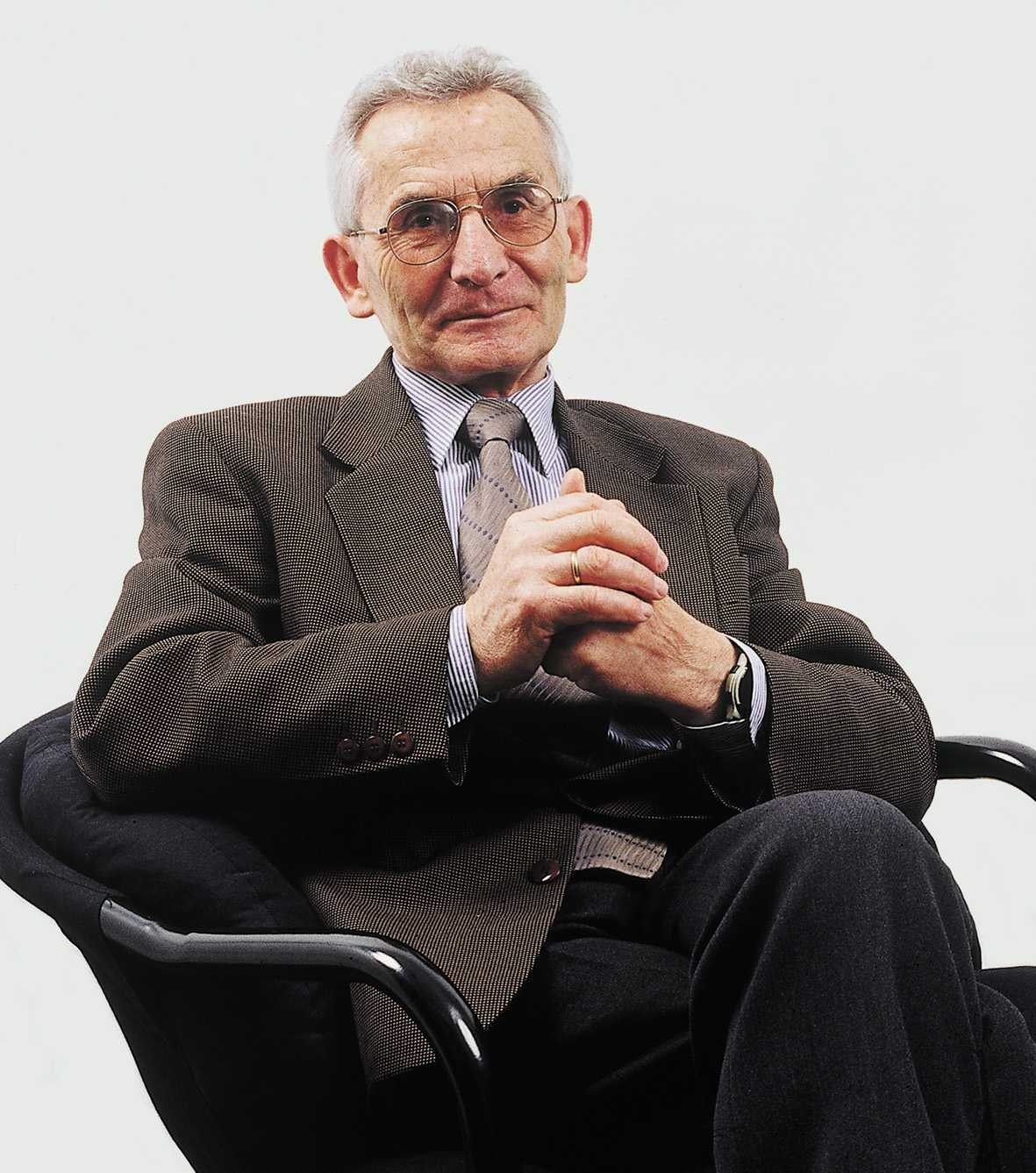
Jan Strelau

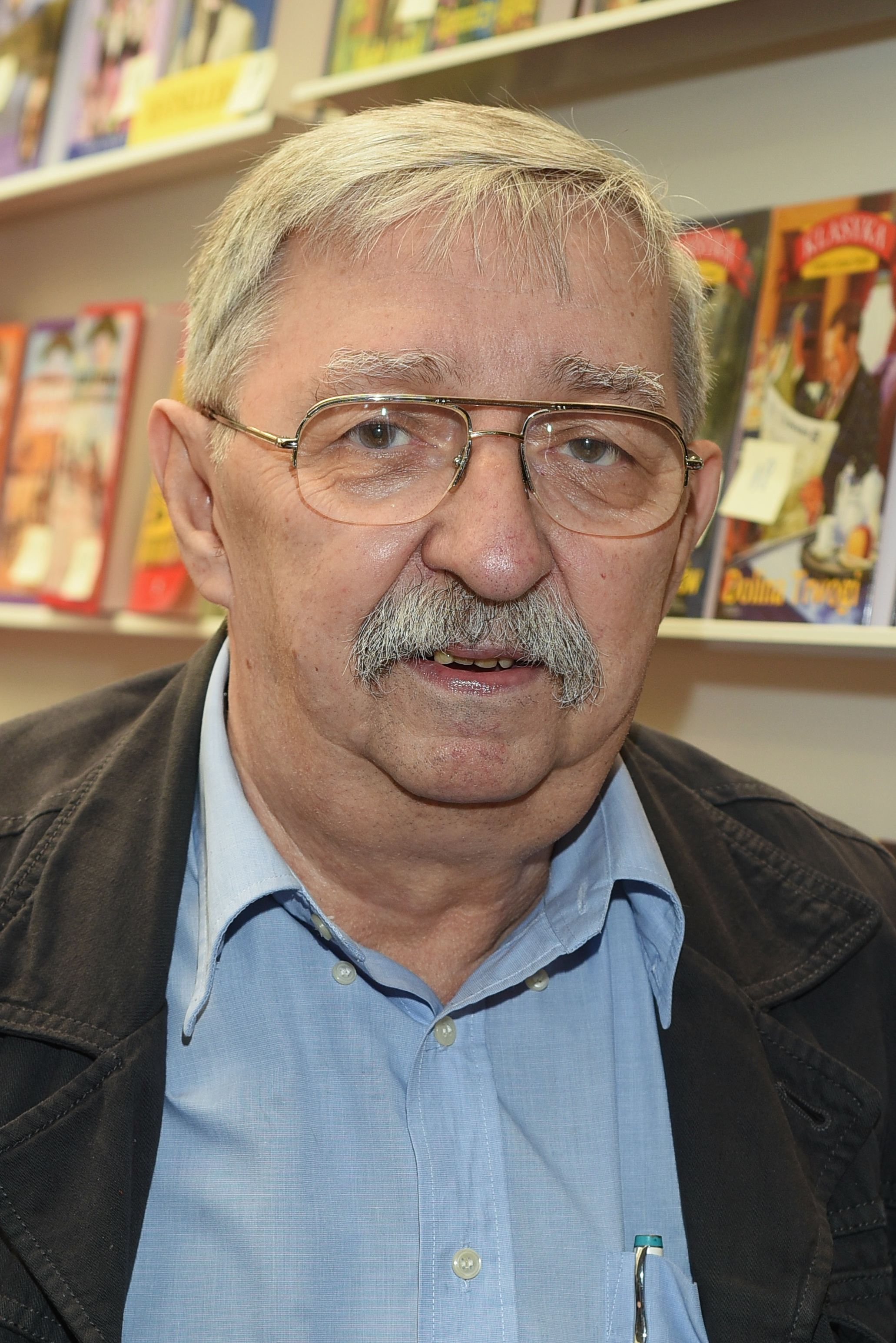
Dariusz Baliszewski

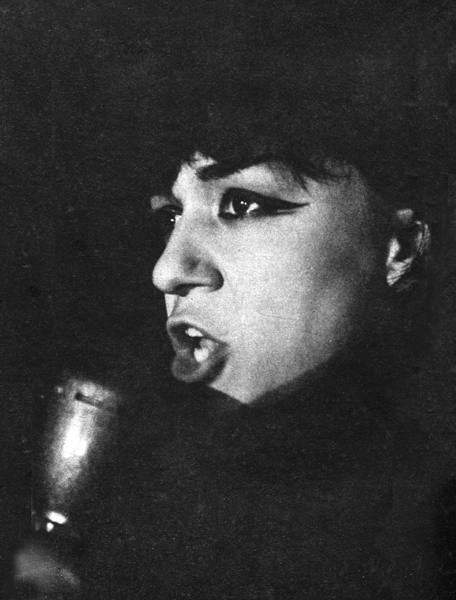
Ewa Demarczyk

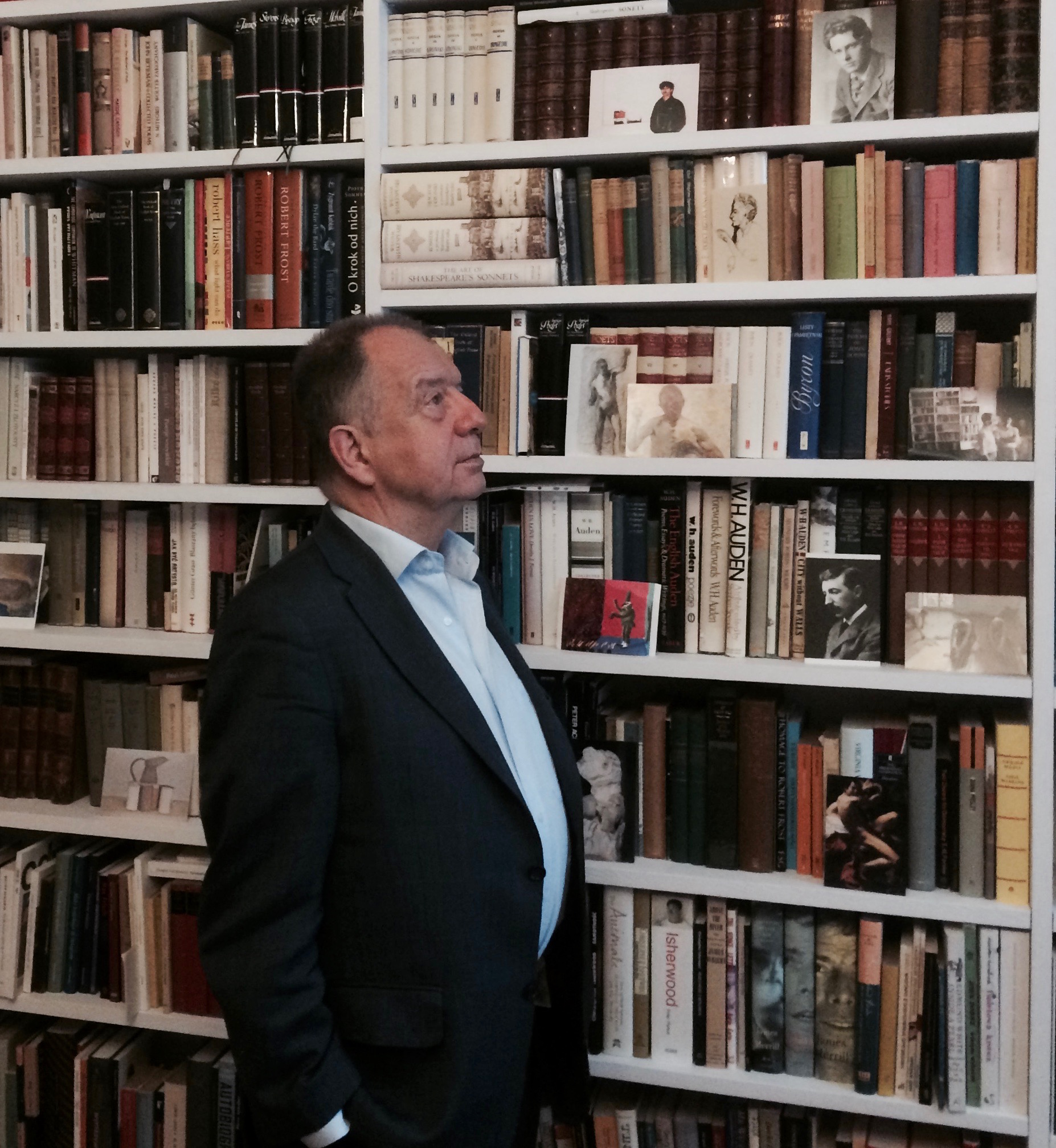
Wojciech Karpiński

- 4 August – Jan Strelau, psychologist (b. 1931).
- 5 August – Stefan Majer, basketball player and coach (b. 1929).
- 10 August – Dariusz Baliszewski, historian, journalist and writer (b. 1946).
- 14 August – Ewa Demarczyk, singer and poet (b. 1941).
- 18 August – Wojciech Karpiński, writer and historian of ideas (b. 1943).
- 22 August – Józefa Hennelowa, journalist and politician (b. 1925).

=== September ===
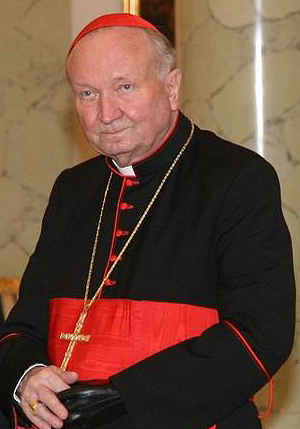
Marian Jaworski

- 1 September – Jerzy Szczakiel, speedway rider (b. 1949).
- 5 September – Marian Jaworski, Roman Catholic cardinal, Archbishop of Lviv of the Latins (b. 1926).

=== October ===
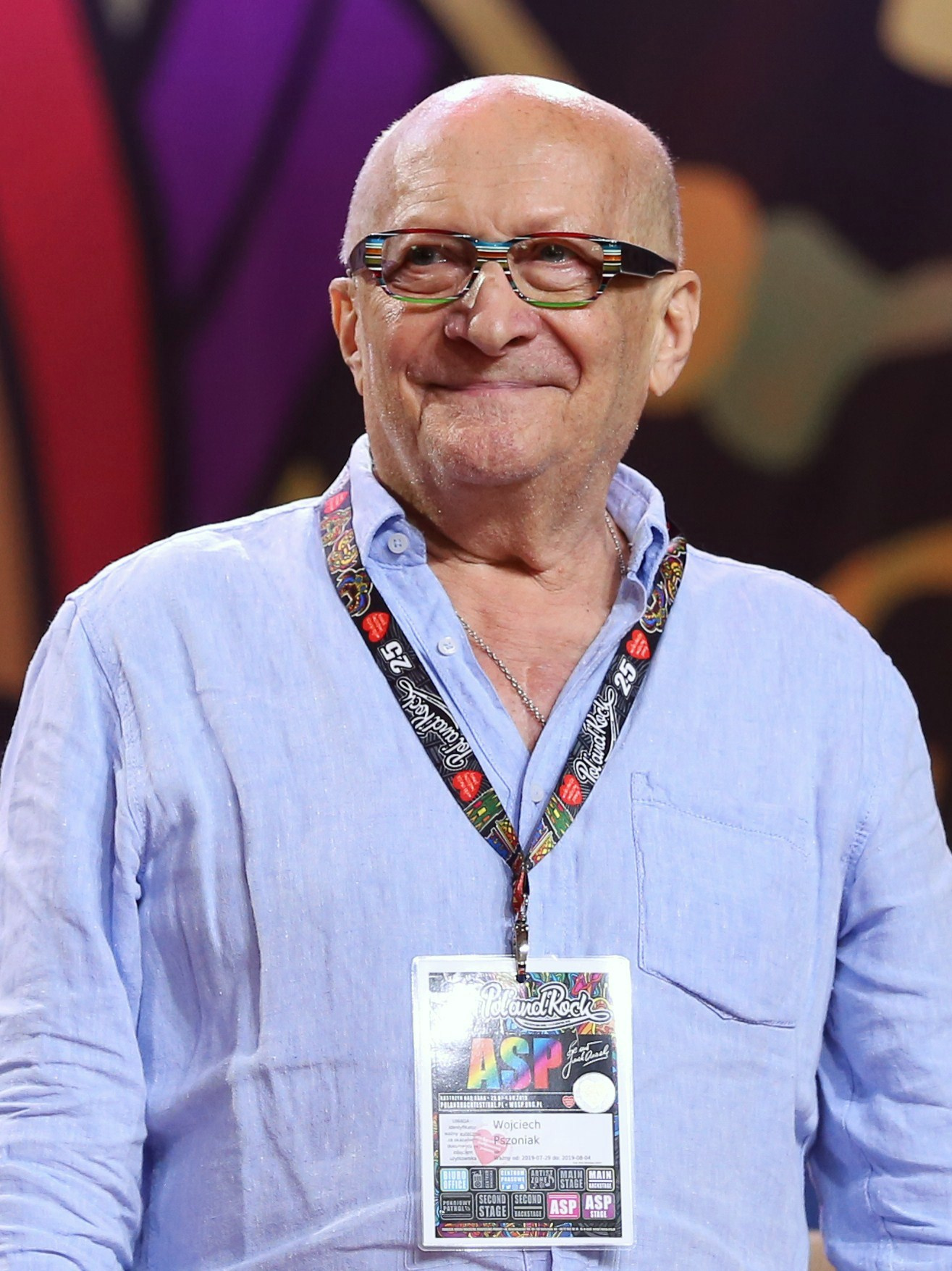
Wojciech Pszoniak

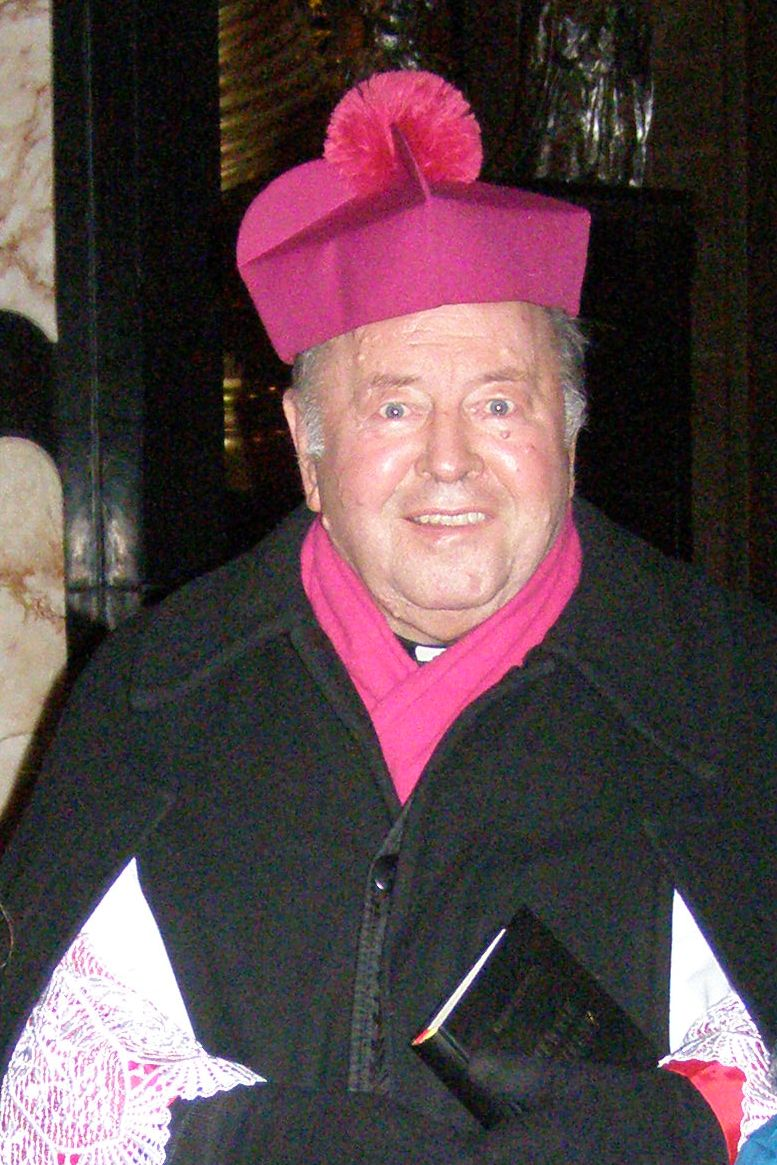
Bogdan Józef Wojtuś

- 17 October – Ryszard Ronczewski, actor (b. 1930).
- 18 October – Stanisław Kogut, politician and trade union activist (b. 1953).
- 19 October – Wojciech Pszoniak, actor (b. 1942).
- 20 October – Bogdan Józef Wojtuś, Roman Catholic prelate (b. 1937).

=== December ===
- 1 December – Hanna Stadnik, Polish resistance veteran and activist (b. 1929).
