= 2018 in Poland =

- Decades: 1990s; 2000s; 2010s; 2020s
- See also: Other events of 2018; Timeline of Polish history

Events from the year 2018 in Poland.

== Incumbents ==
- President – Andrzej Duda (independent, supported by Law and Justice)
- Prime Minister – Mateusz Morawiecki (Law and Justice)
- Marshal of the Sejm – Marek Kuchciński (Law and Justice)
- Marshal of the Senate – Stanisław Karczewski (Law and Justice)

== Events ==
=== January ===
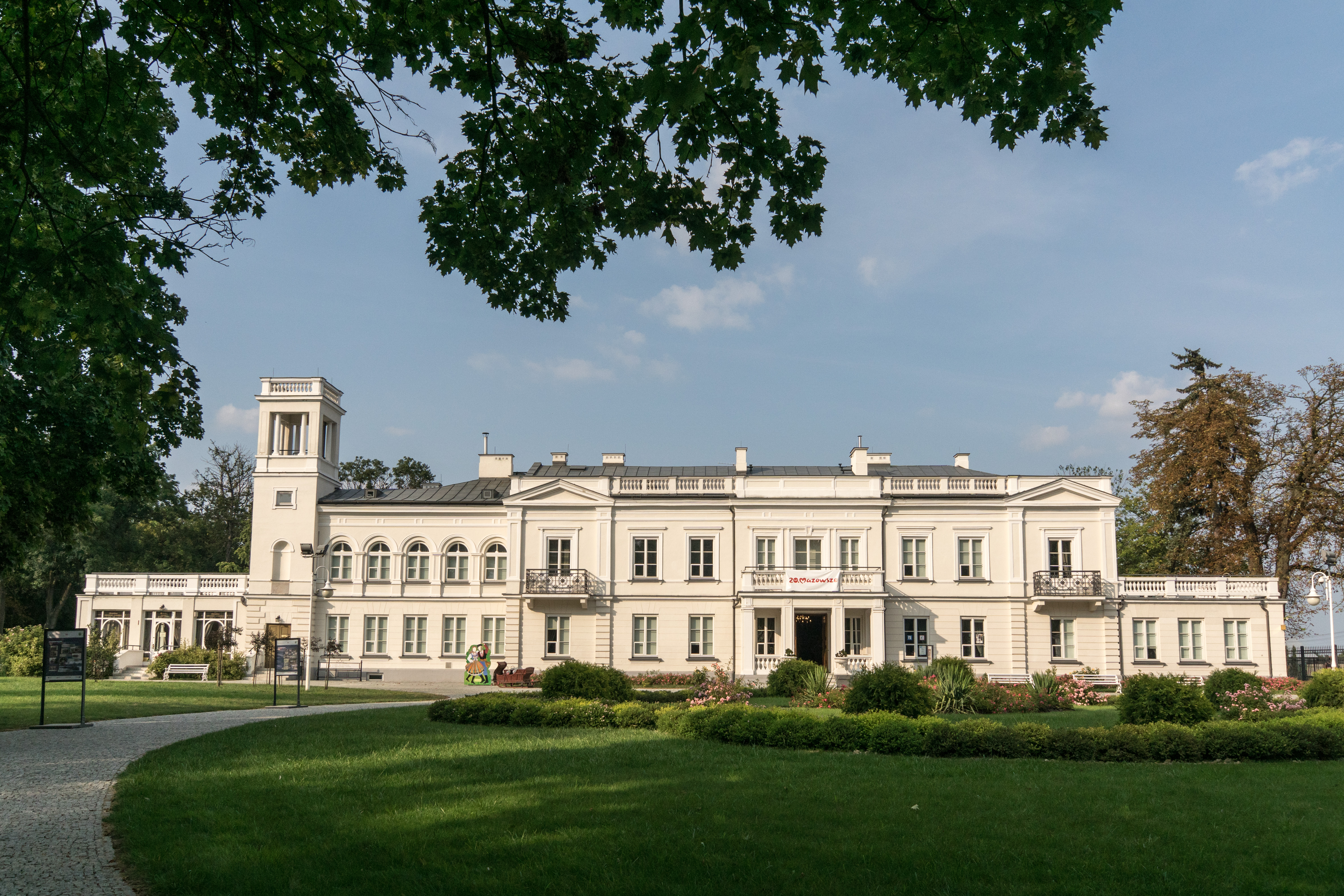
Palace in Sanniki in 2018

- 1 January – Seven localities were granted town rights: Józefów nad Wisłą, Łagów, Otyń, Radoszyce, Sanniki, Tułowice, and Wiślica. For five it was a restoration of previously lost town status.
- 28 January – both chambers of the Polish parliament (Sejm and Senate) adopted an Amendment to the Act on the Institute of National Remembrance criminalizing the attribution of Nazi war crimes and condemning use of the expression "Polish death camp" (see "Polish death camp" controversy).

=== March ===
- 11 March – A new Polish law banning almost all trade on Sundays has taken effect, with large supermarkets and most other retailers closed for the first time since liberal shopping laws were introduced in the 1990s. The Law and Justice party, whose lawmakers passed the legislation with the support of Prime Minister Mateusz Morawiecki.
- 28 March – Poland signs a $4.75 billion deal with the U.S. to buy the Patriot missile defense system, its largest arms purchase.

=== May ===
- 27 May – Parents and disabled children end a 40-day parliament protest over state assisted payments, securing a smaller-than-requested increase in disability payments.
- 28 May – Kremlin warns that United States put military pressure in European Union security at risk. Dmitry Peskov said in statement, "When we see the gradual expansion of NATO military structures towards our borders..., this of course in no way creates security and stability on the continent".

=== June ===
- 4 June – Anwil Włocławek won their second Polish Basketball Championship defeating Stal Ostrów Wielkopolski in the finals (see 2017–18 PLK season).

=== July ===
- 4 July – Supreme Court President Małgorzata Gersdorf addresses supporters in Warsaw and refuses to step down, despite a new law reducing the retirement age for Supreme Court judges, forcing 27 judges into retirement.
- 26 July – Thousands protest across Poland after President Duda signs a law allowing the government to choose the next Supreme Court chief, with clashes reported in Warsaw.

=== September ===
- 29 September – Unia Leszno won their 16th Team Speedway Polish Championship defeating Stal Gorzów Wielkopolski in the finals (see 2018 Polish speedway season).

=== November ===
- 11 November – A 100th Independence Day march in Warsaw draws 200,000, including far-right groups; President Duda attends after a last-minute government-organizer agreement.
- 23 November – Poland's opposition Civic Platform file a no-confidence motion against the ruling Law and Justice party following corruption allegations at the country's financial regulator. Marek Chrzanowski resigns over the scandal.
- 25 November – Roksana Węgiel wins the Junior Eurovision Song Contest 2018 for Poland.

== Holidays ==
- 1 January - New Year's Day
- 6 January - Epiphany
- 1 April - Easter Sunday
- 2 April - Easter Monday
- 1 May - May Day
- 3 May - 3 May Constitution Day
- 20 May - Whit Sunday
- 31 May - Corpus Christi
- 15 August - Assumption Day
- 1 November - All Saints' Day

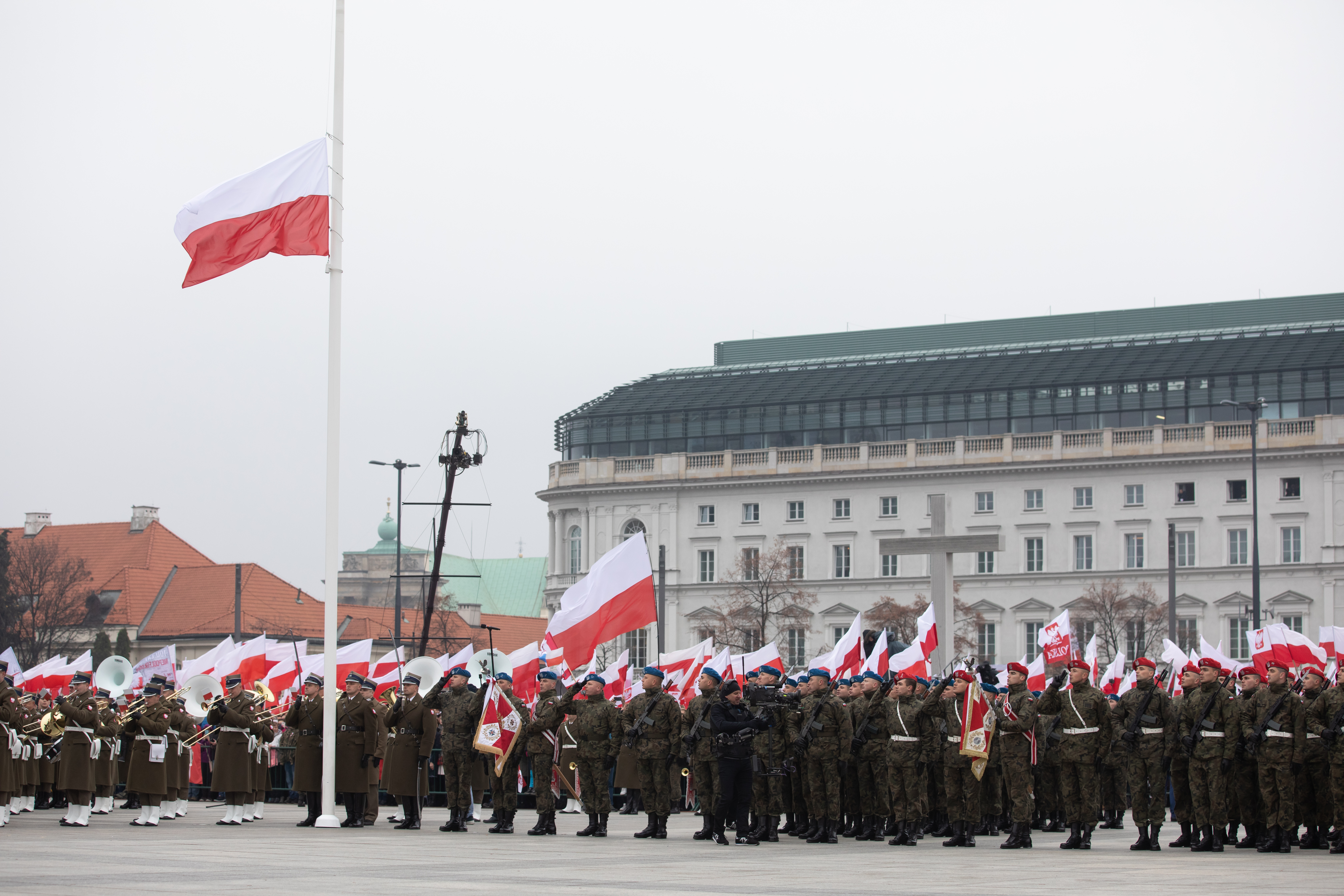
2018 Independence Day in Warsaw

- 11 November - Independence Day
- 25 December - Christmas Day
- 26 December – 2nd Day of Christmas
