= 2017 in Poland =

- Decades: 1990s; 2000s; 2010s; 2020s
- See also: Other events of 2017; Timeline of Polish history

Events during the year 2017 in Poland.

== Incumbents ==
- President — Andrzej Duda (independent, supported by Law and Justice)
- Prime Minister — Beata Szydło (Law and Justice) (until 11 December), Mateusz Morawiecki (Law and Justice) (starting 11 December)
- Marshal of the Sejm — Marek Kuchciński (Law and Justice)
- Marshal of the Senate — Stanisław Karczewski (Law and Justice)

== Events ==
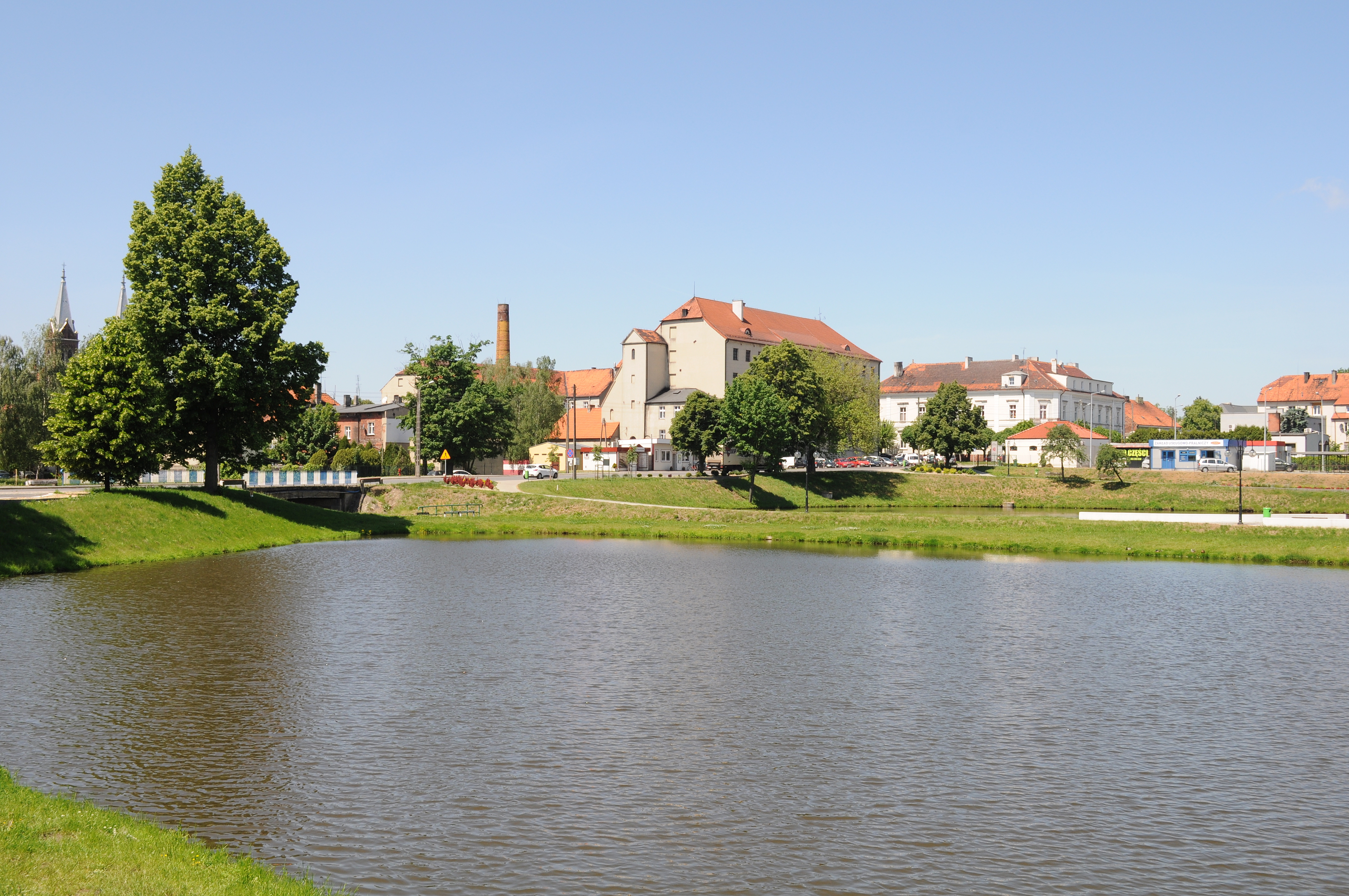
Opatówek in 2017

- 1 January – Four localities were granted town rights: Mielno, Morawica, Opatówek, and Rejowiec.
- 1 January – Ełk riots took place at Ełk Kebab restaurant.
- 12 January – 3,000 U.S. troops are deployed in Poland as part of NATO's Operation Atlantic Resolve.
- 23 April – ZAKSA Kędzierzyn-Koźle won their seventh Polish Volleyball Championship defeating Skra Bełchatów in the finals (see 2016–17 PlusLiga).
- 27 May – Vive Kielce won their 14th Polish Handball Championship defeating Wisła Płock in the finals (see 2016–17 Superliga).
- 4 June – Legia Warsaw won their 12th Polish Football Championship (see 2016–17 Ekstraklasa).
- 10 June – Stelmet Zielona Góra won their fourth Polish Basketball Championship defeating Polski Cukier Toruń in the finals (see 2016–17 PLK season).
- 16–30 June – Poland hosts the 2017 UEFA European Under-21 Championship.

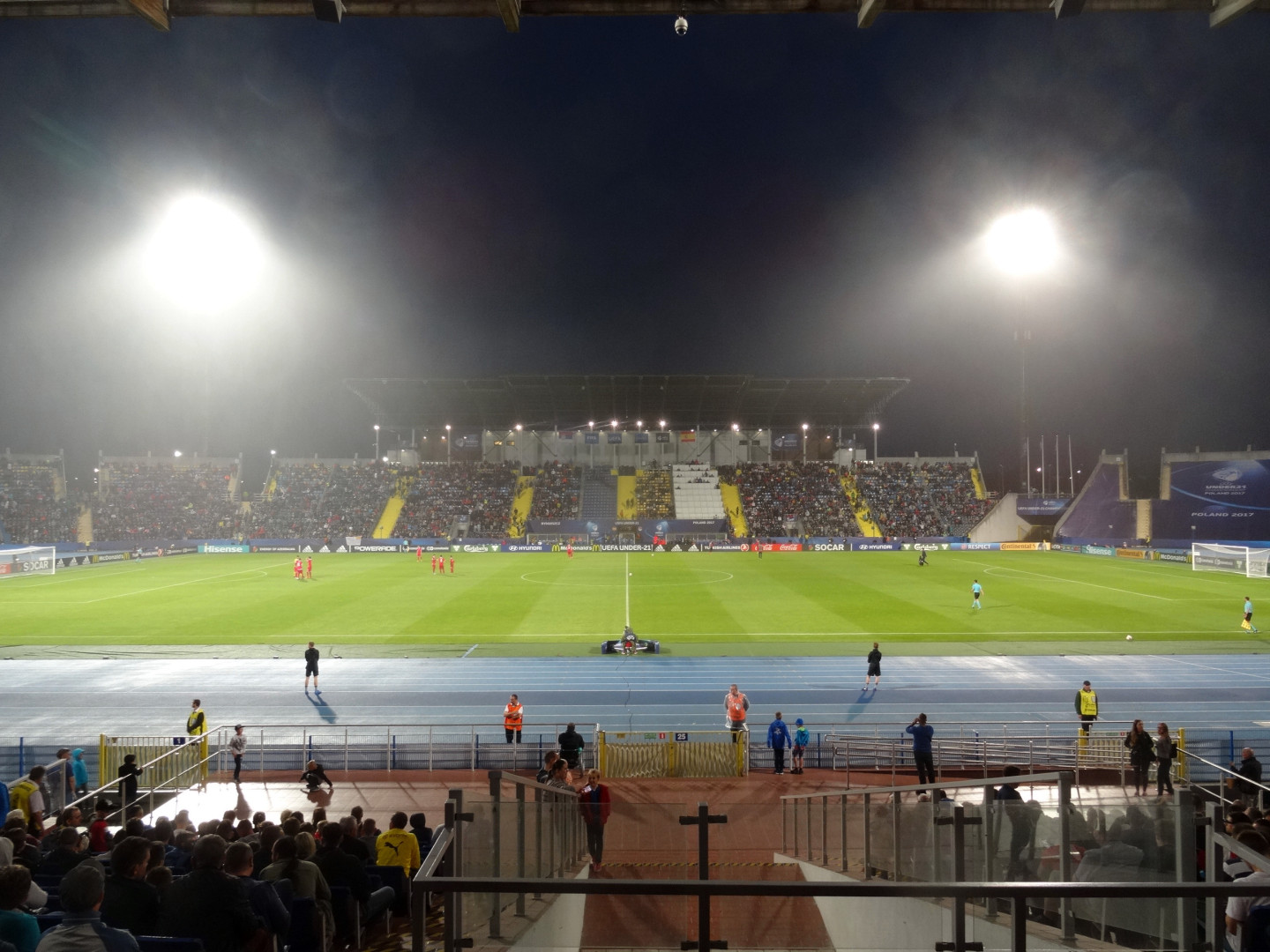
Spain v Serbia match in the 2017 UEFA European Under-21 Championship in Bydgoszcz, 23 June 2017

- 2–12 July – The Annual Meeting of World Heritage Committee held in Kraków.
- 24 September – Unia Leszno won their 15th Team Speedway Polish Championship defeating Sparta Wrocław in the finals (see 2017 Polish speedway season).
- 7 October – "Rosary to the Borders": hundreds of thousands of Polish Catholics prayed the Rosary along the country's borders for peace and for the salvation of Poland and the world against secularization.
- November - 100,000 people gather for annual independence day march

== Deaths ==
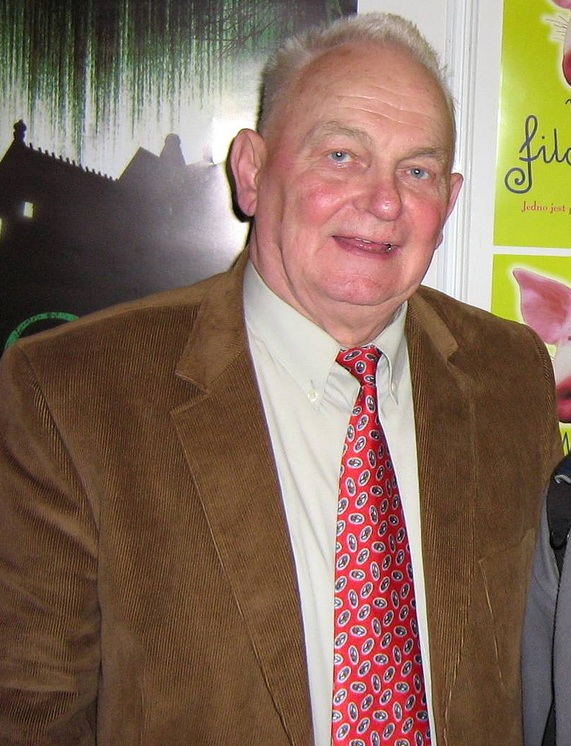
Bogdan Tuszyński

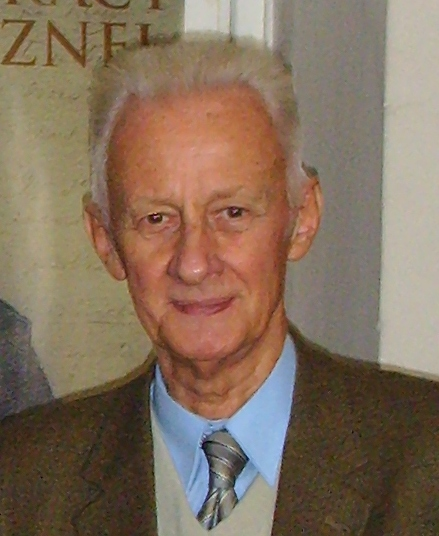
Lech Trzeciakowski

- 1 January – Bogdan Tuszyński, sports journalist, reporter and historian (b. 1932).
- 7 January – Jerzy Kossela, guitarist and vocalist (b. 1942).
- 7 January – Lech Trzeciakowski, historian (b. 1931).
- 27 April – Jan Flinik, field hockey player (b. 1932)
- 16 June – Mieczysław Kalenik, actor (b. 1933)
- 2 August – Wanda Chotomska, children's writer, screenwriter and poet (b. 1929)

== See also ==
- 2017 in Polish television
