= Lucyna Mirosława Falkowska =

Polish oceanographer (1951–2021)

- Born: 1951
- Died: 7 April 2021 (aged 69–70)
- Occupation: oceanographer

Lucyna Mirosława Falkowska (1951 – 7 April 2021) was a Polish scientist and oceanographer. She specialized in atmospheric chemistry, chemical oceanography and protection of the marine environment. Falkowska worked on the Faculty of Oceanography and Geography of University of Gdańsk.

== Education ==
Falkowska obtained her doctorate in 1986 with a thesis on the inflow of nitrogen and phosphorus compounds from the atmosphere to the Baltic Sea (based on studies of the Southern Baltic Sea 1981–1985).

On 29 September 1997 Falkowska was awarded a postdoctoral degree in oceanology at the Department of Biology, Geography and Oceanology, University of Gdańsk, on the basis of her thesis "Sea surface microvegetation: properties and processes". The habilitation process began on 1 January 1996.

== Career ==
Falkowska directed several research projects in 2001. On 8 June 2006, Falkowska was awarded the title of Professor of Earth Sciences by President Lech Kaczyński.

Falkowska was full professor and head of the Laboratory of Sea and Atmospheric Chemistry at the Institute of Oceanography, Faculty of Oceanography and Geography, University of Gdańsk. She was a specialist member of the Committee for Marine Research, Division III of the Natural Sciences and Earth Sciences of the Polish Academy of Sciences.

From 1999 to 2011 Falkowska was a supervisor of eleven PhD theses, a reviewer of two habilitation theses and three PhD theses.

== Honours and awards ==
In 1999, she was awarded the Golden Cross of Merit. She also received the Medal of the National Education Commission and many awards from the Rector of the University of Gdańsk. She was a member of the Gdańsk Scientific Society.

== Death ==
Falkowska died on 7 April 2021.
