= Aleksander Sopliński =

Polish politician (1942–2021)

Member of the Sejm
- In office 19 October 2005 – 7 November 2011
- Constituency: 16 – Płock

Personal details
- Born: 25 March 1942 Ciechanów
- Died: 20 April 2021 (aged 79)
- Party: Polish People's Party

Aleksander Sopliński (25 March 1942 – 20 April 2021) was a Polish politician. He was elected to the Sejm on 25 September 2005, getting 2,589 votes in 16 Płock district as a candidate from the Polish People's Party list.

== See also ==
- Members of Polish Sejm 2005–2007
