= Roman Micał =

Polish hockey player (1939–2021)

Personal information
- Nationality: Polish
- Born: 13 January 1939 Rzeszów, Poland
- Died: 25 March 2021 (aged 82) Poland

Sport
- Sport: Field hockey

Roman Micał (13 January 1939 – 25 March 2021) was a Polish field hockey player. He competed in the men's tournament at the 1960 Summer Olympics.
