= Ewa Wawrzoń =

Polish actress (1937–2021)

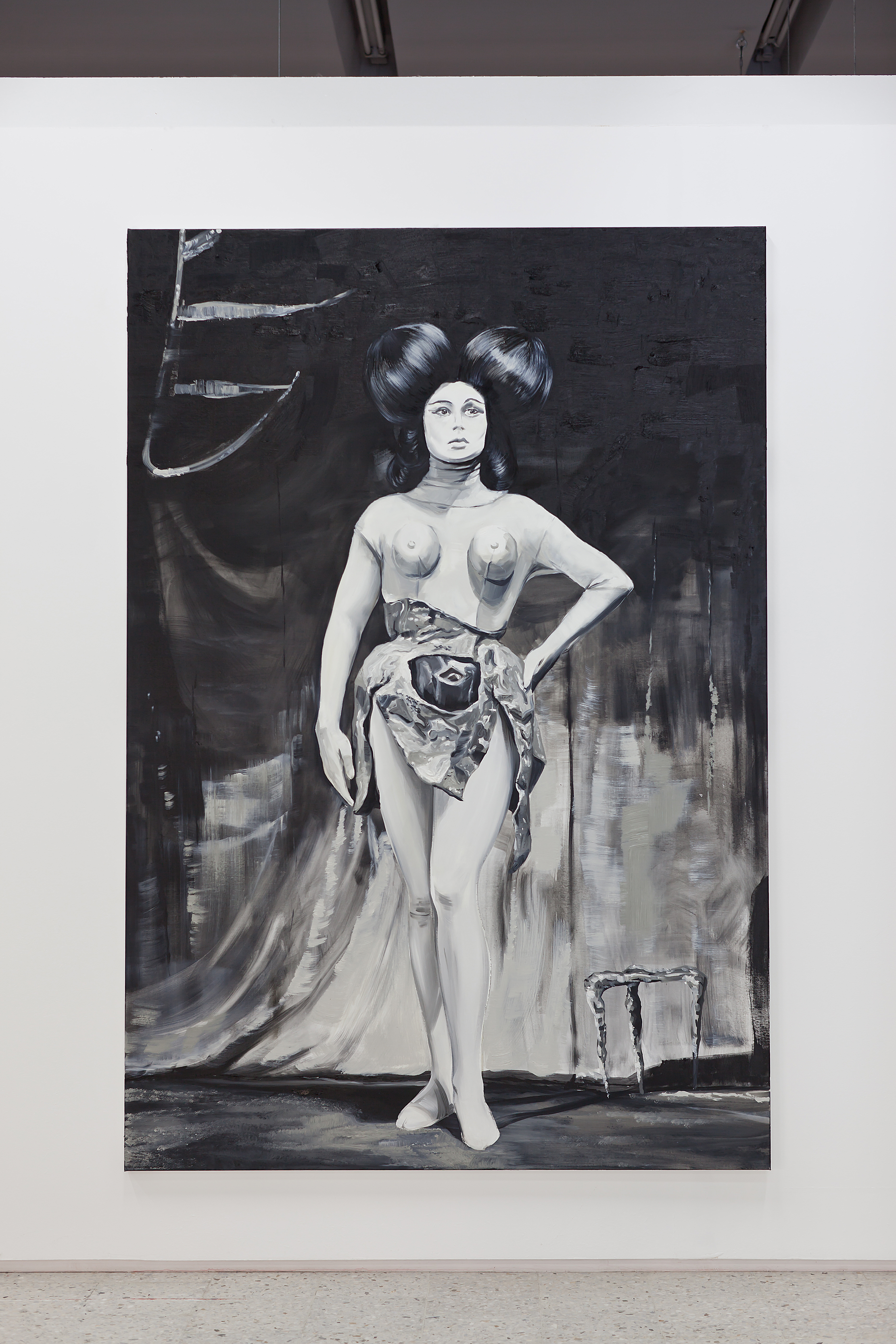

Ewa Wawrzoń (Poland, 11 May 1937 – 14 April 2021) was a Polish actress.
