= Adam Kopczyński =

Polish ice hockey player and coach (1948–2021)

- Born: 2 August 1948; Kraków, Poland
- Died: 8 February 2021 (aged 72); Zgierz, Poland
- Height: 5 ft 9 in (175 cm)
- Weight: 176 lb (80 kg; 12 st 8 lb)
- Position: Forward
- Played for: Cracovia; ŁKS Łódź
- National team: Poland
- Playing career: 1966–1980; 1985

Adam Jakub Kopczyński (2 August 1948 – 8 February 2021) was a Polish ice hockey player. He played for Cracovia and ŁKS Łódź during his career. He also played for the Polish national team at the 1972 Winter Olympics and multiple World Championships. After retiring in 1980, Kopczyński moved to Belgium where he coached local teams.

He died from COVID-19 during the COVID-19 pandemic in Poland.
