= Marek Czekalski =

Polish politician and engineer (1953–2021)

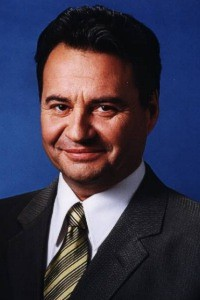
- Czekalski in 2009

Mayor of Łódź
- In office 13 July 1994 – November 1998
- Preceded by: Grzegorz Palka
- Succeeded by: Tadeusz Matusiak

Personal details
- Born: 6 June 1953 Łódź, Polish People's Republic
- Died: 2 April 2021 (aged 67)
- Party: UW

Marek Czekalski (6 June 1953 – 2 April 2021) was a Polish politician and engineer. He served as Mayor of Łódź from 1994 to 1998.

== Biography ==
After he finished his university studies at the Lodz University of Technology, Czekalski joined the Związek Młodzieży Socjalistycznej and was also a member of the Polish United Workers' Party. In 1978, he joined the Committee for Social Self-Defense KOR. In 1980, he joined the Solidarity trade union and was elected president of its textile section. After Martial law in Poland was imposed the following year, he left the union and joined its underground structures. He would organize help for those repressed for political reasons.

In 1989, Czekalski became active in the Solidarity Citizens' Committee. The following year, he was elected to serve on the Municipal Council of Łódź and worked on the presidential campaign of Tadeusz Mazowiecki. He was a part of the Citizens' Movement for Democratic Action and became chairman of the Democratic Union in Łódź Voivodeship, serving for two terms.

In the 1994 Polish municipal elections, Czekalski became Mayor of Łódź as a member of the Freedom Union party. He restructured the municipal council two years into his term with support from the Democratic Left Alliance. He served as Mayor until his term expired in November 1998. He then returned to the municipal council.

Shortly before the 2001 Polish parliamentary election, in which he was a Sejm candidate for the Freedom Union, Czekalski was arrested for accepting a bribe from investors for plans to allow construction of a new shopping center. Criminal proceedings continued for nearly ten years before he was finally acquitted of all charges in February 2011.

In 2007, Czekalski became deputy director of administration of the Muzea w Łodzi and held the same role at MPK Łódź in 2010. In 2013, he joined the programming council of the Marek Edelman Dialogue Center in Łódź.

Marek Czekalski died on 2 April 2021, at the age of 67.

== Distinctions ==
- Knight's Cross of the Order of Polonia Restituta (1999)
