= Helena Pietraszkiewicz =

Polish politician and psychologist (1953–2021)

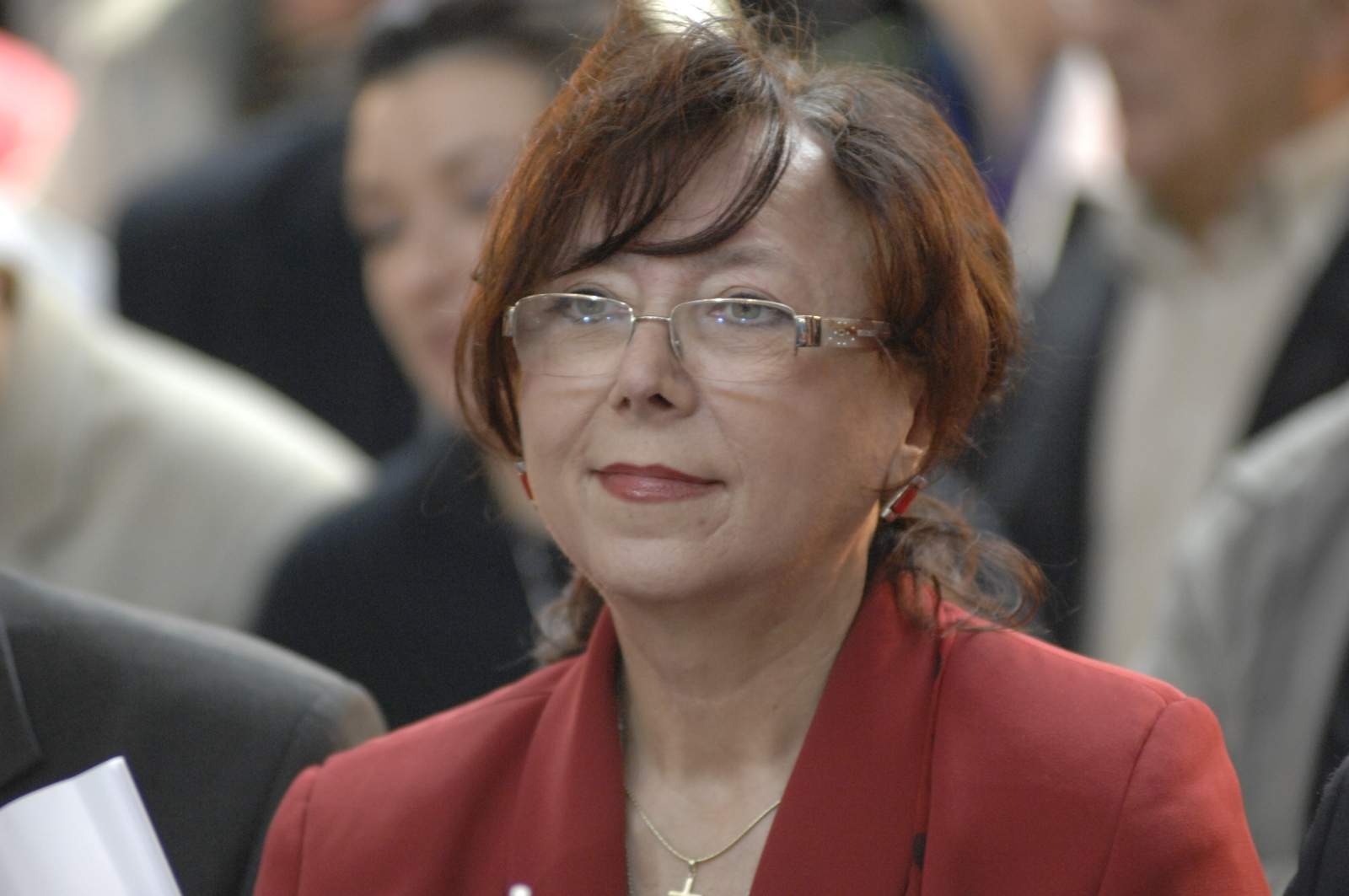
- Pietraszkiewicz in 2009

Voivode of Łódz
- In office 26 January 2006 – 29 November 2007
- Preceded by: Stefan Krajewski
- Succeeded by: Jolanta Chełmińska

Personal details
- Born: 20 July 1953 Lublin, Polish People's Republic
- Died: 1 March 2021 (aged 67) Lublin, Poland
- Party: PiS

Helena Pietraszkiewicz (20 July 1953 – 1 March 2021) was a Polish psychologist and politician.

== Biography ==
Pietraszkiewicz studied psychology at the Catholic University of Lublin and subsequently worked at various clinics in Lublin. She served on the Lublin city council from 1994 to 2006 as a member of the Law and Justice party (PiS). In 2004, she received a Silver Cross of Merit. She served as Voivode of the Łódź Voivodeship from 26 January 2006 to 29 November 2007. In 2014, she returned to the Lublin city council and officially retired from politics in 2018.

Helena Pietraszkiewicz died in Lublin on 1 March 2021, at the age of 67.
