= Anna Koźmińska =

Polish Righteous Among the Nations (1919–2021)

- Born: 22 May 1919; Radomsko, Poland
- Died: 24 March 2021 (aged 101); Warsaw, Poland

Anna Helena Koźmińska (22 May 1919 – 24 March 2021) was a Polish World War II heroine who was recognized as a Righteous Among the Nations in 1991.

Koźmińska was born in Radomsko and lived in Częstochowa, Poland, with her father and step mother. From 1943 to 1945 they sheltered Abraham Joblonski, a young Polish Jew, from the Nazis. The family also sheltered another three Jews.

Koźmińska was awarded a Righteous Among the Nations medal in 1991 by Yad Vashem. In 2016 she was given the Commander's Cross of the Order of Polonia Restituta.

On the occasion of her 101st birthday in May 2020, Koźmińska became the oldest living Righteous Among the Nations and received birthday greetings from the presidents of Israel and Poland. She died in Warsaw in March 2021.
