= Krystyna Łyczywek =

Polish photographer, translator, and journalist

Krystyna Antonina Łyczywek (24 August 1920 – 22 April 2021) was a Polish photographer, translator, and journalist. She was awarded the Gloria Artis Medal in 2010 and made an Officer of the Legion of Honour in 2013.
