= Ryszard Kaja =

Ryszard Kaja (16 January 1962 – 17 April 2019) was a painter, poster artist, stage designer, and costume designer from Poland.

== Biography ==
He studied at the Academy of Fine Arts in Poznan in 1984, and earned a degree in painting under Norbert Skupniewicz. His father is the poster designer Zbigniew Kaja and his mother is the ceramicist and painter Stefania Kaja.

His career can be divided into two distinct periods.

=== Stage and theater design ===
He worked as chief designer at the Grand Theatre in Lodz from 1999 to 2000. In 1994 he was a stage designer at the Opera and Operetta in Szczecin. From 1995 to 2000 he was the chief designer at the Grand Theatre in Poznan. In 1998 he was awarded the prestigious Medal Młodej Sztuki. He designed more than 150 theater, ballet, opera, television, and film sets in Poland and abroad, including France, Germany, Argentina, Israel, and Egypt.

=== Polish poster ===
Ryszard Kaja was regarded as one of Poland's best selling and prolific contemporary poster designers. Following in the tradition of his father Zbigniew Kaja, member of the acclaimed Polish Poster School, Kaja painted his posters using mixed techniques: “I use everything: pen, pencil, ink, color ink, gouache, coffee grounds, tea, ash—everything around me, not just the computer.” He served as juror for many poster biennials including the Italian Poster biennial. He was an honorary guest at the 2015 BICeBé Bienal del Cartel Bolivia (Biennial of Poster, Bolivia). Ryszard lived in Wrocław, Poland where he worked on his "Plakaty z serii POLSKA" (Posters from the series "POLAND") which included 120 posters featuring less well known towns and destinations within Poland.
