= Henryk Ostrowski =

Polish politician (1960–2021)

Member of the Sejm
- In office 19 October 2001 – 18 October 2005
- Constituency: 8 – Zielona Góra

Personal details
- Born: 13 December 1960 Szprotawa
- Died: 18 January 2021 (aged 60) Szprotawa
- Party: Self-Defence of the Republic of Poland

Henryk Ostrowski (13 December 1960 – 18 January 2021) was a Polish politician and farmer who served as a Member of the Sejm in the years 2001–2005.
