= Gdańsk Scientific Society =

General scientific society in Gdańsk, Poland

- Gdańskie Towarzystwo Naukowe
- Abbreviation: GTN
- Formation: 1922
- Type: Scientific society
- Purpose: General scientific society
- Headquarters: Gdańsk, Poland
- Region served: Gdańsk
- Formerly called: Towarzystwo Przyjaciół Nauki i Sztuki w Gdańsku

The Gdańsk Scientific Society (Polish: Gdańskie Towarzystwo Naukowe, GTN) is a general scientific society in Gdańsk, Poland.

It was established in 1922 as the Society of the Sciences and Arts Friends in Gdańsk (Polish: Towarzystwo Przyjaciół Nauki i Sztuki w Gdańsku) in what was then the Free City of Danzig. The society was active until 1939, abolished during World War II, reactivated in 1945, having had its present name since 1956.

Today, it has five divisions.

Its main publications include:

- Rocznik Gdański (transl. Gdańsk Yearbook)
- Acta Biologica
