= Lagoda (disambiguation) =

The Lagoda is a half-scale model of the American 19th century whaling ship Lagoda.

Lagoda or Łagoda may also refer to:

- Łagoda, Poland, a village
- USS Lagoda (SP-3250), a United States Navy patrol vessel in commission from 1918 to 1919
- Natalya Lagoda (1974–2015), Russian–Ukrainian singer, entertainer and model
- Vladislav Lagoda, Ukrainian figure skater - see 2012 Ukrainian Figure Skating Championships
- Yuriy Lagoda, a draughts (checkers) player - see 2012 European championships of international draughts
- The Łagoda family, characters in the Polish soap opera M jak miłość
