= List of M jak miłość characters (Mostowiak family) =

This is a list of characters in the Polish soap opera M jak miłość from the Mostowiak family.

== Lucjan Mostowiak and Barbara Mostowiak ==
Lucjan Mostowiak (Witold Pyrkosz) and Barbara Mostowiak, born Wrzodak (Teresa Lipowska) are seniors of Mostowiak family. Lucjan is a son of Teodor Mostowiak and his wife, Maria Mostowiak. His maternal grandparents were Jan and Felicja. He was born on 19 December 1931 and died on 25 July 2017. Barbara was born on 15 May 1940. Lucjan was raised in Grabina with his older sister, Hanna. During the World War II Hanna was taken to Germany and later declared missing. In 1945 Lucjan was arrested by Germans and his parents had to pay them money to free him. He had no money, so his father stole them from Mr. Markowski who owned a shop. Markowski then committed suicide when he learnt that he lost all his money. Mostowiak family tried to find Hanna via the Red Cross but it was unsuccessful. In 2013 they learnt that Hanna moved to United States after the war and had a family. In the late 1950s a teenage Barbara Wrzodak was engaged to marry Zenon Łagoda. When he decided to move to United States, she fell pregnant. Łagoda wanted Barbara to make an abortion but she refused and they split. Lucjan Mostowiak proposed to Barbara and offered her to raise her child as his own. They married on 4 November 1960 and their daughter Maria was born on 24 December 1960. They had three more children: Marta (born in 1970), Marek (born in 1978) and Małgorzata (born in 1980). They didn't tell to anyone that Maria was not Lucjan's biological child. In 1980 Lucjan and Barbara took part in a car accident - a car driven by Waldemar Jaroszy (who had not a driving license) crashed with them. As a result, two people died - Władysław Walisiak and his wife, Maria, leaving their five years old daughter Hanna. A girl was taken from a burning car by Lucjan and he saved her life. In 2001 Marek started dating Hanna. She wanted to take a revenge on Mostowiak family because she thought that they killed her parents. Hanna revealed to pregnant Maria that she was Łagoda's child and Maria started a premature birth. Her daughter Maria died hours after being born. Lucjan, Barbara and Marek forgave Hanna and she married Lucjan's son. In 2016 Barbara said that she and Lucjan were expecting another child but she miscarried. For some time, Lucjan and Barbara lived in Gródek and in Warsaw. Lucjan died in 2017 after an illness. Barbara now lives in Grabina with her daughter Maria, son-in-law Artur, granddaughter Barbara and grandson Mateusz.

=== Maria Rogowska ===
- Status: present, living in Grabina since 2019
- Occupation: nurse
- Marital status: married to Artur Rogowski since 2018

Maria (Marysia) Rogowska (Zduńska, née Mostowiak), played by Małgorzata Pieńkowska, is the daughter of Zenon Łagoda and Barbara Mostowiak and the legal daughter of Lucjan Mostowiak. She was born on 24 December 1960 in Grabina, and has four younger half-siblings: Marta Budzyńska, Marek Mostowiak, Małgorzata Chodakowska and Michał Łagoda. Maria met Krzysztof Zduński in school, and married him. They spent several years in Grabina before moving to Gródek. Maria and Krzysztof had twin sons, Paweł and Piotr, and she was pregnant again in 2001. The day she learned that Zenon Łagoda was her biological father, she gave birth to her daughter Maria (who died of heart problems). Krzysztof died in 2005, and Maria married longtime friend Artur Rogowski in 2008 during their trip to Oslo to visit Artur's sister. Maria gave birth to a daughter, Barbara, in 2009 at her home in Gródek. A nurse, she worked in her half-brother's office in Gródek. In November 2012, she moved to Trondheim and the Gródek office was sold when Pieńkowska decided to leave the show. Maria returned to Poland in May 2014, helping Kinga give birth at home to her son Mikołaj. In late 2015 she discovered that her husband has a romance with Teresa Drawicz and decided to divorce him. Maria started dating her new friend, Robert Bilski. In the meantime, Artur broke off with Teresa who tried to kill Maria by her car in September 2015. Artur defended his wife and was injured by the car driven by Teresa. Rogowska took care of Artur but ended her relationship with Robert in Autumn 2016. Maria and Artur are trying to reconcile their relationship.

==== Paweł Zduński ====
- Status: present, living in Warsaw since 2001
- Birth: February 18, 1984
- Parents: Krzysztof Zduński (father), Maria Rogowska (mother), Artur Rogowski (stepfather)
- Marriages: Joanna Liberadzka (married 2011, divorced 2012), Alicja Domańska (married 2014, divorced 2018), Katia Tatiszwili (married 2018, divorced 2018), Franciszka Janik (married 2022)
- Children: Barbara Zduńska (born 2006, adopted 2018), Adam (born 2012, stepson)
- Occupation: businessmen

Paweł Zduński (Rafał Mroczek) is the son of Krzysztof Zduński and Maria Rogowska, born in 1984. He has a twin brother (Piotr), a deceased sister (Maria) and a half-sister (Barbara). Magdalena Zduńska's godfather, Paweł lives in Warsaw and worked at the Oaza nightclub until May 2012. He fell in love with his mother's cousin, Teresa Makowska, who had a daughter (Agnieszka) from her previous marriage. Teresa lived in Szczecin, and came to Grabina to escape her abusive husband. They lived in Warsaw before they separated and Teresa returned to Szczecin. Paweł had an affair with Magdalena Marszałek (Kinga's and Piotr's roommate), but she went to Africa to work for Polska Akcja Humanitarna. He impregnated Sylwia Okońska; she miscarried, and although they separated they remained good friends. Paweł proposed to Maja Chojnacka; although she accepted, she was jealous of Magdalena. Maja went to Austria and Mexico because of family problems, and he was unable to find her. Although Paweł's friend Aleksandra (Ola) loved him, he only wanted to be friends. In 2011, after Krystyna Filarska's and Wojciech Marszałek's wedding, he had a one-night stand with Magdalena Marszałek (in Poland for the wedding). Paweł married Joanna Liberadzka on 28 November 2011. Their witnesses were Kinga Zduńska and Piotr Zduński and they spent their honeymoon in Karlscrona, Sweden. Paweł was jealous of his wife's continued interest in former boyfriend Jan Kozłowski, and they divorced on 10 September 2012. In autumn 2012, Magdalena Marszałek returned to Poland; they met, and remained close friends. After the divorce Paweł had a romance with his married chef, Izabela Sajdak. On 20 May 2013, he received an email from his ex-wife requesting a meeting. In 2014 he dated Alicja Domańska, who has a daughter named Barbara. At that time he proposed to former girlfriend Magda Marszałek (hospitalised for a heart transplant), who accepted. Paweł's promise to marry her helped her recover, and she apologised to Alicja for his behaviour. In late 2014 Paweł married Alicja Domańska and wants to adopt her daughter. In November 2015 Paweł with his family moved to Grabina. Paweł opened his own firm. He divorced Alicja on 30 January 2018 after it was revealed in late 2017 that she fell pregnant with her British friend. Alicja with her daughter Barbara moved permanently to England. Paweł started drinking too much alcohol. In 2021 he got engaged to Franciszka Janik and they married on 1 February 2022 in a religious ceremony in Bukowina Tatrzańska. Paweł learnt that his wife gave birth in 2012 to a son Adam and gave up her maternal rights. Her son was adopted by an American family and lives in the United States.

===== Barbara Zduńska =====
- Status: present, living in Warsaw since 2019
- Parents: Jerzy Domański (father), Alicja Zduńska (mother), Paweł Zduński (adopted father)
- Occupation: student of primary school
- Families: Zduński, Domański, Łagoda

Barbara Zduńska, born Domańska (Gabriela Raczyńska) is a first child of Paweł Zduński and his second wife, Alicja Zduńska. She is a biological daughter of Jerzy Domański. She was born on 15 July 2006. Barbara was born after her parents married, but her father left them when she was young and moved to Spain. Her mother used to work in another countries and it was Barbara's aunt, Olga, who took care of her. Barbara met Paweł Zduński while waiting for her aunt and decided to meet him with her mother. Paweł and Alicja started dating and married on 9 September 2014. Barbara later met her grandfather, Stefan Domański and her father. In 2017 Alicja moved to England and started there a romance with a man named Mark. She fell pregnant and announced her intention to divorce Paweł. They divorced on 30 January 2018 and Alicja took Barbara to England with her. Barbara escaped because she felt unwell in her new family. She lives in Warsaw with Paweł. Barbara has a maternal half-brother from her mother's new relationship.

==== Piotr Zduński ====
Piotr Zduński
- M jak miłość character
- Portrayed by: Marcin Mroczek
- Duration: 2000-present
In-universe information
- Occupation: lawyer
- Family: Zduński, Łagoda
- Father: Krzysztof Zduński
- Mother: Maria Mostowiak
- Spouse: Kinga Filarska (married 2002)
- Children: Magdalena Zduńska; Mikołaj Zduński; Emilia Zduńska; Zuzanna Zduńska

Piotr Zduński (Marcin Mroczek) is a son of Krzysztof Zduński and Maria Rogowska, born in 1984. He has a twin brother (Piotr), a deceased sister (Maria) and a half-sister (Barbara). The godfather of Anna Wojciechowska, Piotr secretly married Kinga Filarska when they finished secondary school and they moved to Warsaw. They lived with friends before winning a lottery in 2009 and buying a house on Deszczowa Street in Warsaw. That year they had a church wedding, and their daughter Magdalena was born. After studying computer science in Warsaw, Piotr decided to become a lawyer like his aunt Marta Wojciechowska. He finished his studies in 2010, working in Berlin for several months. Piotr works at a company owned by his aunt's fiancé, Andrzej Budzyński, and Adam Werner. On 28 November 2011, he witnessed his brother's wedding to Joanna Liberadzka. In March 2012 Kinga accused him of having an affair with his friend, Monika Ochman, but they reconciled. In Autumn 2014 Kinga gave birth to their second child, son Mikołaj.

===== Magdalena Zduńska =====
Magdalena Zduńska
- M jak miłość character
- Duration: 2009-present
In-universe information
- Occupation: student of primary school
- Family: Zduński, Łagoda, Filarski
- Father: Piotr Zduński
- Mother: Kinga Filarska

Magdalena Zduńska is a first child of Piotr Zduński and his wife, Kinga Filarska-Zduńska. She was born on 9 March 2009 in Warsaw. She has three siblings: Mikołaj, Emilia and Zuzanna. Magdalena is a first great-grandchild of Barbara Mostowiak and first legal great-grandchild of Lucjan Mostowiak. She was christened on 22 February 2010 and her godparents are Paweł Zduński (her paternal uncle) and Magdalena Marszałek (her maternal stepaunt). She is named after her godmother.

===== Mikołaj Zduński =====
Mikołaj Zduński
- M jak miłość character
- Duration: 2014-present
- First appearance: 6 May 2014
In-universe information
- Occupation: student of primary school
- Family: Zduński, Łagoda, Filarski
- Father: Piotr Zduński
- Mother: Kinga Filarska

Mikołaj Zduński is a second child and only son of Piotr Zduński and his wife, Kinga Filarska-Zduńska. He was born on 6 May 2014 at his parents' home in Warsaw and was delivered by his paternal grandmother, Maria Rogowska. He has three sisters: Magdalena, Emilia and Zuzanna. He was christened on 8 September 2014 in Warsaw and his godparents are Ireneusz Podleśny and Mirosława Kwiatkowska (his parents' friends).

===== Emilia Zduńska =====
Emilia Zduńska
- M jak miłość character
- Duration: 2019-present
In-universe information
- Family: Zduński, Łagoda, Filarski
- Father: Piotr Zduński
- Mother: Kinga Filarska

Emilia Zduńska is a third child and second daughter of Piotr Zduński and his wife, Kinga Filarska-Zduńska. She was born on 25 February 2019 in Warsaw via cesarean section. She has a twin sister, Zuzanna Zduńska and two older siblings: Magdalena Zduńska and Mikołaj Zduński. She was christened on 12 March 2019 in Warsaw and her godparents are Andrzej Budzyński and Anna Waszkiewicz (her parents' friends).

===== Zuzanna Zduńska =====
Zuzanna Zduńska
- M jak miłość character
- Duration: 2019-present
In-universe information
- Family: Zduński, Łagoda, Filarski
- Father: Piotr Zduński
- Mother: Kinga Filarska

Zuzanna Zduńska is a fourth child and third daughter of Piotr Zduński and his wife, Kinga Filarska-Zduńska. She was born on 25 February 2019 in Warsaw via cesarean section. She has a twin sister, Emilia Zduńska and two older siblings: Magdalena Zduńska and Mikołaj Zduński. Zuzanna is named after her paternal grandfather's deceased sister, Zuzanna Zduńska. She was christened on 12 March 2019 in Warsaw and her godparents are Andrzej Budzyński and Anna Waszkiewicz (her parents' friends).

==== Maria Zduńska ====
- Status: deceased since 2001

Maria Zduńska was a third child and first daughter of Maria Zduńska and her husband, Krzysztof Zduński. She was born on 2 June 2001 in Gródek with an unexpected heart disease. Maria was expecting her third child after many years of marriage and was 41 at the time. She learnt from Hanna Mostowiak that her biological father was Zenon Łagoda and the stress caused the premature childbirth. A girl, who was named Maria to honour her mother, died a few hours after birth.

==== Barbara Rogowska ====
- Status: present, living in Grabina since 2018
- Occupation: student of primary school

Barbara Rogowska (Diana Dudzińska) is a first child of Maria Rogowska and her husband, Artur Rogowski. She was born on 3 November 2009 at her parents' home in Gródek and was delivered by her father. Shortly after her birth she was kidnapped by Aleksander Gałązka, a man who fanatically loved her mother. Barbara was saved by her maternal grandmother, Barbara Mostowiak and was named after her. She has two half-brothers, Piotr Zduński and Paweł Zduński and is younger than her niece, Magdalena Zduńska. In November 2012 she moved to Trondheim, Norway with her parents to live with her paternal aunt, Agata Rogowska. Her father came back to Poland in December 2012 and her mother in September 2013. Her parents divorced in July 2015 and Barbara stayed in Warsaw with her mother. However, they reconciled and married again on 26 November 2018. She now lives in Grabina at her mother's family home. In 2021 she is dating Dawid Jaszewski, who suffers from an undiagnosed disease.

=== Marek Mostowiak ===
Marek Mostowiak
- M jak miłość character
- Portrayed by: Kacper Kuszewski
- Duration: 2010-2018
In-universe information
- Occupation: Businessman
- Family: Mostowiak
- Father: Lucjan Mostowiak
- Mother: Barbara Wrzodak
- Spouse: Hanna Walisiak (married 2001, widowed 2011); Ewa Kolęda (married 2015)
- Children: Natalia Mostowiak; Urszula Lisiecka; Mateusz Mostowiak

Marek Mostowiak (Kacper Kuszewski) is a second child and only son of Lucjan Mostowiak and his wife, Barbara Mostowiak. He was born on 4 January 1978. Marek came to Grabina from Germany in 2000. At the time, he was in a relationship with Katarzyna Wójcik. They split when Marek met Hanna Walisiak. Marek married Hanna in 2001 and their son, Mateusz, was born in 2002. They adopted two daughters from an orphanage in Józefowo, Natalia and Urszula. Hanna died on 7 November 2011. In May 2014 he got engaged to his schoolfriend, Ewa Kolęda and they married in January 2015. On 3 April 2017 Ewa miscarried their daughter, Julia Mostowiak. In October 2018 Marek with wife and son moved to Australia.

==== Natalia Mostowiak ====
- Status: non-present, living in Australia since 2019
- Occupation: policewoman
- Marital status: married to Franciszek Zarzycki since 2017

Natalia Zarzycka, adopted Mostowiak (Marcjanna Lelek) is an adopted daughter of Marek Mostowiak and his first wife, Hanna Mostowiak. She was born on 21 March 1996. Natalia was raised in an orphanage in Józefowo where she met Hanna. Marek and Hanna adopted her in February 2005. Natalia has an adopted sister, Urszula and an adopted brother, Mateusz. Her adopted mother died on 7 November 2011 and on 19 January 2015 her father married Ewa Kolęda. Natalia is a policewoman. In 2015 she had a romance with Dariusz Maj and fell pregnant. She gave birth to her first child, Hanna Mostowiak, in October 2015. On 4 September 2017 she got engaged to her friend, Franciszek Zarzycki and they married on 27 November 2017. Then they moved to southern Poland and their marriage was on rocks because Franciszek betrayed Natalia with his former girlfriend, Justyna. In 2019 Natalia with her family moved to Australia.

===== Hanna Zarzycka =====
- Status: non-present, living in Australia since 2019

Hanna Zarzycka, born Mostowiak is a first child of Natalia Mostowiak and her husband, Franciszek Zarzycki. Her biological father is her mother's former lover, Dariusz Maj. She was born on 5 October 2015 in a forest near Grabina and was delivered by her mother's friend, Franciszek Zarzycki. She was baptised in December 2015 in Grabina and her godparents are Franciszek Zarzycki and her maternal adopted aunt, Urszula Mostowiak. In 2016 she was adopted by Franciszek Zarzycki. She lives in Australia with her parents and maternal grandparents.

==== Urszula Lisiecka ====
- Status: living in Australia since 2020
- Occupation: former owner of Siedlisko
- Marital status: married to Bartosz Lisiecki since 2019

Urszula Lisiecka, born Jakubczyk, adopted Mostowiak (Iga Krefft) is an adopted daughter of Marek Mostowiak and his first wife, Hanna Mostowiak. She was born on 10 April 1996. Her biological father, Bronisław Jakubczyk, lives in Grabina and is an alcoholic. Urszula was raised in an orphanage in Józefowo and was adopted by Marek and Hanna in September 2008. In November 2011 her adoptive mother died. Urszula studied in Urle to become a policewoman. In January 2015 her adoptive father married Ewa Kolęda. Urszula has an adoptive sister, Natalia, an adoptive brother, Mateusz and a stepbrother, Antoni Szefler. She got engaged to Bartosz Lisiecki on 11 March 2019 and they married in Grabina on 4 June 2019. Ula is an owner of an agritourism farm which she inherited from her maternal aunt, Anna Gruszczyńska in March 2018. Urszula is a godmother to her niece, Hanna Mostowiak. On April 7, 2020 Urszula and her husband moved to Australia without informing their closest family. On 24 January 2022 Urszula and Bartosz adopted Kalina Lisiecka, Bartosz's niece, whose parents died in a car accident in late 2021.

==== Mateusz Mostowiak ====
- Status: present, living in Grabina since 2022
- Occupation: student
- Marital status: married to Liliana Mostowiak since 2020

Mateusz Mostowiak (Krystian Domagała) is a first child of Marek Mostowiak and his first wife, Hanna Mostowiak. He was born on 3 April 2002 at his grandparents' home in Grabina. His godparents are Michał Łagoda (his aunt's boyfriend) and Małgorzata Mostowiak (his paternal aunt). In November 2002 he was kidnapped by Irena Gałązka, former adoptive mother of Hanna, who fanatically wanted to have a child. He has two adopted sisters, Natalia and Urszula and one stepbrother, Antoni Szefler. On 7 November 2011 his mother died. In January 2015 his father married Ewa Kolęda. For some time Mateusz lived in Australia with his father and stepmother but in May 2019 he escaped and came back to Poland because he loved his schoolfriend, Lilia Banach. In January 2020 Lilia was raped by Daniel and it resulted in her pregnancy. Mateusz took care of her, telling his relatives that Banach was expecting his child (recreating the history of his grandparents - Lucjan also took care of Barbara when Zenon Łagoda left her pregnant and moved to United States). She later miscarried after Daniel tried to rape her for a second time. Mateusz and Liliana married in a church ceremony on April 21, 2020. Mateusz and Liliana separated in 2021 after she had an extramarital romance and he started his six month journey to Africa on a ship. He came back to Grabina in September 2022 and met his wife again, after she was dumped by her Australian lover Ethan Anderson.

=== Marta Budzyńska ===
- Status: present, living in Warsaw since 2019
- Occupation: lawyer, judge
- Marital status: married to Jacek Milecki since 2024

Marta Milecka, born Mostowiak, primo voto Milecka, secundo voto Wojciechowska, tertio voto Budzyńska (Dominika Ostałowska) is a second child and second daughter of Lucjan Mostowiak and his wife, Barbara Mostowiak. She was born in 1972. She has three siblings: Maria, Marek and Małgorzata. Marta studied law in Warsaw and became a judge. In September 1993 she gave birth to her first child, Łukasz Mostowiak, whose father was Norbert Wojciechowski. Norbert left Marta and she raised their child alone. In 2001 she married her friend, Jacek Milecki. Their marriage ended in divorced in 2002 after Jacek betrayed her with Iwona Majer. Marta then met Norbert Wojciechowski again and they renewed their romance. Marta married Norbert in Warsaw on 11 October 2005 and their second child, Anna Wojciechowska, was born on 14 February 2006. Their marriage ended when on 3 December 2007 Norbert was killed in a plane crash. In May 2010 she got engaged to Andrzej Budzyński, a lawyer and they married in Warsaw on 16 January 2012. Marta then learnt that Andrzej had a son born out of wedlock and fathered a child with Agnieszka Olszewska. She moved to Colombia in October 2016 with her children and divorced Andrzej on 15 May 2017. Marta then came back to Warsaw and on 9 March 2020 her first grandchild, Natalia, was born. In March 2022 her second grandchild, Jan Wojciechowski. On 16 December 2024 she married in a civil ceremony her first husband, Jacek Milecki.

==== Łukasz Wojciechowski ====
- Status: present, living in Warsaw since 2019
- Occupation: none
- Marital status: affair with Patrycja Argasińska since 2021

Łukasz Wojciechowski, born Mostowiak (Franciszek Przybylski, Adrian Żuchewicz, Jakub Józefowicz) is a first child of Marta Mostowiak and her then lover, Norbert Wojciechowski. He was born on 9 September 1993 in Warsaw. His godfather was Krzysztof Zduński (his maternal uncle-in-law). He has one sister, Anna. Łukasz's father left Marta when she was pregnant and Łukasz got the surname Mostowiak after his birth. Marta told him that his father was dead. Łukasz accidentally learnt from a newspaper that his father is a well-known politician and they met. However, at the time Marta was dating Jacek Milecki and she refused to change Łukasz's surname to Wojciechowski. In May 2003 Łukasz and Norbert were in the United States and had an accident - Norbert saved Łukasz's life and was disabled since that. He reconciled with Marta and they married in January 2006. Norbert died in a plane crash in December 2007. As a teenager, he was dating Gabriela Lassota (his schoolfriend) and Zuzanna. In 2012 he started to study medicine in Białystok. He met Karolina Osiecka, daughter of his mother's friend, Wiktor Żak, and started dating her. On 30 December 2013 they had an accident in which Karolina died. Her heart was transplanted to Magdalena Marszałek. Łukasz decided to quit his studies and move to Colombia with his new friend, Kamila. He went there in January 2015 and Marta joined him in 2017. Łukasz came back to Poland in February 2019. He had a romance with Katia, wife of his first cousin, Paweł Zduński, and she fell pregnant. They have on-off relationship and their daughter Natalia was born in March 2020. In March 2022 Patrycja Argasińska, who was married to Jerzy Argasiński, gave birth to Łukasz's son Jan.

===== Natalia Wojciechowska =====
- Status: non-present, living in Georgia since 2020

Natalia Wojciechowska is a first child of Łukasz Wojciechowski and his former partner, Katia Tatiszwili. She was born on 9 March 2020 in Warsaw. She is a first biological great-grandchild of Lucjan Mostowiak. Natalia is half-Polish via her father and half-Georgian via her mother and is the first member of Mostowiak family who is of mixed origin. On March 23, 2020 she and her mother were forced by Igor (Katia's former fiance) to move with him to Georgia. He used a domestic violence.

===== Jan Wojciechowski =====
Jan Wojciechowski
- M jak miłość character
- Duration: 2022-present
In-universe information
- Occupation: Lawyer
- Family: Wojciechowski, Mostowiak, Argasiński
- Father: Łukasz Wojciechowski
- Mother: Patrycja Argasińska

Jan Lucjan Norbert Wojciechowski is a second child of Łukasz Wojciechowski and first child of his lover, Patrycja Argasińska. He was born on 21 March 2022 in Gródek. He was named Jan (after his maternal grandfather), Lucjan (after Lucjan Mostowiak, his deceased paternal great-grandfather) and Norbert (after Norbert Wojciechowski, his deceased paternal grandfather). At the time of his birth, Patrycja was married to Jerzy Argasiński and Jan was initially believed to be Argasiński'son. Łukasz learnt on the day of Jan's birth that Patrycja was expecting his baby.

==== Anna Wojciechowska ====
- Status: present, living in Warsaw since 2019
- Occupation: student of primary school
- Marital status: dating Adam Warecki (2021)

Anna Wojciechowska (Julia Paćko, Weronika Wachowska, Gabriela Świerczyńska) is a second child and only daughter of Marta Wojciechowska and her second husband, Norbert Wojciechowski. She was born on 14 February 2006 in Warsaw. Her godparents are her half-cousin Piotr Zduński and his wife, Kinga Filarska-Zduńska. She has one brother, Łukasz. She was named after Łukasz's schoolteacher. Anna's father died in a plane crash in December 2007. Her mother later married Andrzej Budzyński and Anna treated him like her father. On 1 October 2012 she was operated because of a pituary tumor. In November 2015 she witnessed a murder in a forest in Grabina and had mental disorder for some time. From 2017 to March 2019 she lived in Colombia with her brother and mother. In February 2020 she had a conflict with her adopted first cousin once-removed, Barbara Zduńska, because they fell in love with the same boy, Damian, and he chose Anna.

=== Małgorzata Chodakowska ===
- Status: non-present, living in United States since 2013
- Occupation: garden architect
- Marital status: divorced from Tomasz Chodakowski since 2014

Małgorzata Chodakowska, born Mostowiak, primo voto Łagoda, secundo voto Miller, tertio voto Chodakowska (Joanna Koroniewska) is a fourth child and third daughter of Lucjan Mostowiak and his wife, Barbara Mostowiak. She was born on 8 April 1980. She has three siblings: Maria, Marta and Marek. She was nicknamed Myszka by her father. In 2000 Małgorzata started dating Michał Łagoda (who turned out to be Maria Rogowska's paternal half-brother). They married in 2002 but divorced in 2004 because she had extramarital romance with Zbigniew Napiórkowski (October 2003) and accused Michał of being a gay. She had also relationships with Konrad Badecki (December 2001) and Marcin Sadowski (2006–2007). On 26 April 2005 she married Stefan Miller, a German farmer and her neighbour from Grabina. Mostowiak didn't love Stefan and worked in Warsaw for the most time. They divorced in December 2005. In September 2007 Małgorzata met Tomasz Chodakowski who saved her life because a man wanted to rape her. They married on 11 November 2009 in a hospital because Mostowiak was expecting their child. Their only son Wojciech was born on 23 November 2009. They also raised Zofia Warakomska, whose parents were Tomasz's friends and tragically died in Szczecin. After the birth of Wojciech, Małgorzata suffered from postpartum depression and had a therapy in France. Chodakowska and her husband had marital problems because of her work in Rome and comeback of his former fiancée, Agnieszka Olszewska. After they reconciled, Małgorzata started her work in United States to gain money for their new home, leaving Tomasz and Zofia in Warsaw in September 2013. She renewed her romance with her first husband, Michał Łagoda. They got engaged, she fell pregnant and they were planning their wedding. On 12 May 2014 Małgorzata divorced Tomasz Chodakowski. She and Michał had a car accident in Los Angeles on 3 June 2014. Michał died at the age of 40 and Małgorzata gave birth to their stillborn daughter. It was later revealed that Małgorzata joined the sect and a young Polish nanny Joanna Tarnowska was taking care of Wojciech. Tomasz tried to take Wojciech back to Poland and Joanna came with him in September 2015. Mostowiak family has no contact with Małgorzata. It was later revealed that she is being treated in a psychiatric hospital in the United States. Her third husband married Joanna Tarnowska in March 2017 and died in September 2017. Małgorzata is a godmother of her nephew, Mateusz Mostowiak.

==== Zofia Warakomska ====
- Status: non-present, living in France since 2019
- Occupation: student

Zofia Warakomska (Julia Wróblewska) is a stepdaughter of Małgorzata Chodakowska and her third husband, Tomasz Chodakowski. She was born on 15 June 1999 in Szczecin and raised there by her parents. Her mother died on 14 September 2009 after a long illness and her father, Wojciech Warakomski, died on 10 October 2011 during his work as a policeman. Tomasz and Małgorzata took care of her during the illness of her mother and she stayed with them. Zofia has one stepbrother, Wojciech Chodakowski. Her stepmother went to United States in 2013 and left their family; her stepfather died in September 2017. Zofia was then raised by her stepfather's second wife, Joanna Chodakowska. In late 2018 she had a romance with a married man named Eryk, a pianist, ten years senior. They split and Zofia moved to France.

==== Wojciech Chodakowski ====
- Status: present, living in Warsaw since 2015
- Occupation: student of primary school

Wojciech Chodakowski (Franciszek Korzeniewski) is a first child of Małgorzata Chodakowska and her third husband, Tomasz Chodakowski. He was born on 23 November 2009 in Warsaw. He has one paternal half-sister, Helena Chodakowska and one stepsister, Zofia Chodakowska. His parents divorced on 12 May 2014 and his mother moved to United States where she lives currently. On 28 March 2017 his father married Joanna Tarnowska who took care of Wojciech. Tomasz died on 11 September 2017 in Warsaw and Joanna is raising Wojciech alone. They live in Warsaw.

== Hanna Smine ==
- Status: deceased since 1978
- Marital status: married to Mr. Smine

Hanna Smine, born Mostowiak (never seen on screen) was a first child of Teodor Mostowiak and his wife, Maria Mostowiak. She was born in 1922 and died in 1978. She had one brother, Lucjan Mostowiak. Hanna was declared missing during World War II. Her family tried to find her via The Polish Red Cross, but their attempts were unsuccessful and she was thought to be dead in Germany. It was revealed in 2013 that she outlived the war and moved to United States where she married and had at least one child. She was a grandmother of Jane Bufford (probably via her unnamed deceased daughter).

=== Jane Bufford ===
- Status: non-present, living in United States since 2015

Jane Bufford (Joanna Osyda) is a first child of Mr and Mrs. Bufford and a granddaughter of Hanna Smine. She was born in 1990 in the United States. She has a half-sister, Eryka Bufford. Distanst cousin of Mostowiak family, she came to Grabina in April 2013 in order to take money that should be inherited by her grandmother. She needed money to pay for an operation of her sister who had a tumour in her brain. The court orderer Mostowiak family to pay 300 000 Polish zloty to Jane. However, in Autumn 2013 Lucjan's neighbour, Włodzimierz Kisiel, found a will made by Lucjan's mother, Maria Mostowiak. She wrote that she wants Barbara to inherit her fortune and the order was annulled. Jane was dating her cousin, Paweł Zduński (2013) and Marcin Chodakowski (2013–2014). In 2015 she came back to United States, after her sister Eryka fell in love with Chodakowski.

== Ludwik Mostowiak ==
Ludwik Mostowiak was a brother of Teodor Mostowiak and paternal uncle of Hanna Smine and Lucjan Mostowiak. He was born on 19 December 1931 and died on 25 July 2017.

== Makowski-Jakubczyk family ==
=== Teresa Jakubczyk ===
- Status: non-present, living in Szczecin since 2019
- Marital status: divorced from Mariusz Jakubczyk since 2018

Teresa Jakubczyk, primo voto Makowska, secundo voto Jakubczyk (Joanna Sydor-Klepacka) is a cousin of Barbara Mostowiak. She came to Gródek from Szczecin to escape from her aggressive husband, Tadeusz Makowski. Teresa had a romance with her cousin, Paweł Zduński and lived with him and her daughter, Agnieszka Makowska. She later decided to come back to Szczecin and it led to Paweł having a suicide attempt. Teresa came to Warsaw again in 2017. On 19 March 2018 she divorced her second husband, Mariusz Jakubczyk because he also beat her. She was briefly dating Adam Werner.

==== Agnieszka Makowska ====
- Status: present, living in Warsaw since 2017

Agnieszka Makowska (Ina Sobala) is an only child of Tadeusz Makowski and his then wife, Teresa Makowska. She was born in 1998 and raised in Szczecin. She came with her mother to Gródek to escape from her aggressive father. For some time Agnieszka lived in Warsaw with her mother and her new partner (and distant cousin), Paweł Zduński. After their split, Agnieszka moved to Szczecin again. She came to Warsaw in 2017 as a young woman. She works at a cafe owned by Kinga Zduńska. She was dating Aleksander Chodakowski (2019) and her another distant cousin, Łukasz Wojciechowski (2020).

== See also ==
- List of M jak miłość characters
