= List of M jak miłość characters =

The following is a list of characters from the Polish TV series M jak miłość.

For biographies of members of Mostowiak family, see: List of M jak miłość characters (Mostowiak family)

== Major families ==
=== Chodakowski family ===
Grzegorz Chodakowski (born 1967)
married Aleksandra (divorced)

Marcin Chodakowski (born 1987)
married Izabela Lewińska in 2020 (divorced 2023)
married Kama Cieślar in 2025

Szymon Chodakowski (born 2015, son of Marcin Chodakowski and Katarzyna Mularczyk)
Maja Chodakowska (born 2017, daughter of Marcin Chodakowski and Izabela Lewińska)

Aleksander Chodakowski (born 1992)
married Magdalena Marszałek in 2015 (divorced 2017)
married Aneta Kryńska in 2020

Maciej Chodakowski (born Romanowski in 2006, adopted son of Aleksander Chodakowski and Magdalena Marszałek)
Borys Chodakowski (born 2022, Vienna)

Tomasz Chodakowski (born 1978, died 2017)
married Małgorzata Mostowiak in 2009 (divorced 2014)
married Joanna Tarnowska in 2017

Wojciech Chodakowski (born 2009)
Helena Chodakowska (born 2016, Warsaw, daughter of Tomasz Chodakowski and Agnieszka Olszewska)

Grzegorz Chodakowski (Wojciech Majchrzak) is a first child of Mr. and Mrs. Chodakowski and older brother of Tomasz Chodakowski. He was born on 6 May 1967.

Aleksandra Chodakowska (Małgorzata Pieczyńska) is a wife of Grzegorz Chodakowski. She was born on 12 May 1965. Aleksandra has one sister, a nun named Łucja (born 9 July 1967, died 14 March 2008).

Aleksander Chodakowski (Maurycy Popiel) is a first child of Grzegorz Chodakowski and his wife, Aleksandra Chodakowska. He was born on 6 June 1987. He married Magdalena Marszałek on 22 December 2015. In March 2016, they adopted a son, Maciej Romanowski, who was born in 2006. Their marriage ended in divorce on 19 September 2017. Aleksander civilly married Aneta Kryńska, a doctor whom he met at work, on 28 April 2020, in a prison in Warsaw. Their son, Borys Chodakowski, was born in April 2022.

Maciej Chodakowski, born Romanowski (Franciszek Przanowski) is an adopted son of Aleksander Chodakowski and his first wife, Magdalena Chodakowska, and biological son of Krzysztof Romanowski. He was born in 2006. His biological father, Krzysztof Romanowski, died because of heart attack on 18 January 2016. On 14 March 2016, he was adopted by Aleksander and Magdalena. His parents later divorced and he lives with his mother and stepfather, Andrzej Budzyński.

Borys Chodakowski is a son of Aleksander Chodakowski and his second wife, Aneta Chodakowska. He was born on 12 April 2022, in Vienna, Austria.

Marcin Chodakowski (born 18 August 1990, Mikołaj Roznerski) is a son of Grzegorz Chodakowski and his wife, Aleksandra Chodakowska. He is married to Kamila Chodakowska (2025-) and was previously married to Izabela Lewińska (2020-2023). He has two children: Szymon Chodakowski (born 2015) and Maja Chodakowska (born 2017). Marcin was raised in Germany by his father, because his mother left the family and moved abroad. He was a boxer. He came to Warsaw because he had a conflict with boxer club's chef. Marcin had romances with Weronika Zawada (who was married to Ryszard Zawada, 2013), Agnieszka Olszewska (2012), Eryka Bufford (2013-2014) and Jane Bufford (2013). In 2014 he met Katarzyna Mularczyk. They started dating and she fell pregnant. Marcin got engaged to Katarzyna on 29 December 2014. On 9 March 2015, their son Szymon Chodakowski was born in Warsaw, but Katarzyna died as a result of severe blooding. Marcin, who raised his son alone, met Izabela Lewińska. She worked as a curator and controlled Marcin's family. They fell in love and has a daughter, Maja Chodakowska, on 14 November 2017. In the meantime, Izabela married her former boyfriend, Artur Skalski and didn't say Marcin that she was expecting their child. Artur was killed in October 2019 by Aleksander Chodakowski. Marcin and Izabela engaged on 28 January 2020 and married in a church ceremony on 24 March 2020. Chodakowski owns a company. Marcin and Iza divorced on 24 October 2023 after her romance with Radosław.

Szymon Chodakowski is a first child of Marcin Chodakowski and his fiancee, Katarzyna Mularczyk. He was born on 9 March 2015. His mother died hours after his birth and he was raised by his father and stepmother, Izabela Chodakowska. His parents divorced in October 2023 and he was living with his father.

Maja Chodakowska is a first child of Marcin Chodakowski and his then girlfriend, Izabela Lewińska. She was born on 14 November 2017. Her parents married in 2020 and divorced in October 2023.

Tomasz Chodakowski (Andrzej Młynarczyk) was a second child of Mr. and Mrs. Chodakowski and younger brother of Grzegorz Chodakowski. He was born on 7 July 1978. He lived in Szczecin and worked as a policeman. He decided to change his work and become a driver after the death of his close friend. He took care of his daughter, Zofia Warakomska. Tomasz met Małgorzata Mostowiak and saved her life when a man tried to rape her. They married on 10 November 2009, and their son was born on 23 November 2009. In the past, Tomasz was engaged to Agnieszka Olszewska, who escaped from the church minutes before their wedding. Agnieszka came to Warsaw from Szczecin and they renewed their relationship. Tomasz's relationship with Agnieszka and Małgorzata's work abroad was bad for their marriage. In 2014 Małgorzata left her family and moved to United States where she got engaged to her first husband, Michał Łagoda, and fell pregnant. Tomasz divorced her on 12 May 2014. Chodakowski had another one night stand with Olszewska. It resulted in a birth of their daughter, Helena Chodakowska, on 23 February 2016. Tomasz started dating Joanna Tarnowska, a nanny of Wojciech. Tomasz and Joanna married on 28 March 2017. Chodakowski was attacked with a knife and died in a Warsaw hospital on 11 September 2017.

Wojciech Chodakowski is a son of Tomasz Chodakowski and his wife, Małgorzata Chodakowska. He was born on 23 November 2009 in Warsaw.

Helena Chodakowska is a daughter of Tomasz Chodakowski and his then lover, Agnieszka Olszewska. She was born on 23 February 2016. She spent her first years in Warsaw. In September 2017 her father died. In April 2020 she moved to home town of her mother, Szczecin.

=== Filarski family ===
Zbigniew Filarski (born 1952, died 2023)
married Krystyna (divorced)

Kinga Filarska (born 1984)
married Piotr Zduński in 2002/2009

Magdalena Zduńska (born 2008)
Mikołaj Zduński (born 2014)
Emilia Zduńska (born 2019)
Zuzanna Zduńska (born 2019)

Zbigniew Filarski (Andrzej Previgs) was a senior of Filarski family. With his wife Krystyna Filarska he had only child, Kinga Filarska. Zbigniew owned a company and produced windows. He was wealthy and was displeasured when his daughter started meeting Piotr Zduński who came from a middle-class family. Zbigniew was often aggressive towards Piotr and his family, even after in March 2004 he offered a work in his firm to Krzysztof Zduński. As a result of Zbigniew's behaviour, Kinga and Piotr married in a secret in May 2003. A great crisis in Zbigniew's relationship with his in-laws was in October 2004 when a client cheated Krzysztof Zduński and company lost a lot of money. The situation led to separation between Kinga and Piotr who were on opposite sites of the arguing. On 27 October 2004 Filarski had an accident and he was expected to be paralyzed. He died on 23 September 2023.

Krystyna Filarska-Marszałek is a first wife of Zbigniew Filarski. In November 2004, after her husband's accident, she had to run their windows company but was struggling.

Kinga Filarska-Zduńska, born Filarska (Katarzyna Cichopek) is a daughter of Zbigniew Filarski and his wife, Krystyna Filarska. She was born on 22 May 1984. Kinga graduated from secondary school in Gródek. In 2001 she started a relationship with Piotr Zduński, her classmate. Her parents, owners of a wealthy firm producing windows, were opposed to Piotr, because his family was not so wealthy. In early 2002 Kinga was supposed to be pregnant but she was not. However, her parents wanted her to split with Piotr and moved her to a Catholic secondary school. In October 2002 Kinga was injured in a car accident and lost her vision. After an unsuccessful operation she was predicted to never see again. Piotr took care of Kinga and it convinced her parents that he was a great partner for their daughter. In February 2003 Kinga had another operation and regained her vision. On 11 March 2003 Kinga and Piotr decided to get married and engaged on 23 April 2003. They married in a secret civil ceremony in Gródek on 13 May 2003 with Paweł Zduński and Anna Waszkiewicz as their witnesses. Kinga changed her surname to Filarska-Zduńska. After their parents learnt about the wedding, they decided that Kinga and Piotr will live at Filarski's house and it generated a lot of conflicts between Piotr, Kinga and their in-laws. Kinga passed a matura exam in 2003 and moved with her husband to Warsaw. There, she bought a flat after her mother gave her money. In November Kinga was accepted into Warsaw University to study psychology. She and Piotr moved into a flat with their new friends: Kamil Gryc and Magdalena Marszałek. In January 2004 Kinga had a one night stand with Kamil. Filarska-Zduńska started working as a waitress in a night club.

=== Gryc family ===
Jerzy Gryc

Kamil Gryc (Marcin Bosak) is a lawyer from Warsaw. In late 2003 he was a student in Warsaw and moved into a flat with Kinga Filarska-Zduńska, Piotr Zduński and Magdalena Marszałek. In January 2004 he had a one-night stand with Kinga, causing a crisis in her young marriage. Then he had a romance with Magdalena Marszałek who discovered in February 2004 that she was expecting his child.

Pola Gryc is a daughter of Kamil Gryc and his former partner, Weronika. Kamil has his parental rights and raises his daughter with Anita Laskowska, his current fiancee.

=== Janik family ===
Jędrzej Gutowski is a paternal uncle of Franciszka Janik. He is married to Hanna Gutowska since 2024.

Hanna Gutowska (Elżbieta Wójcik-Firek) is a wife of Jędrzej Gutowski since 2024.

Franciszka Zduńska, born Janik (born 1992, Dominika Kachlik) is a fourth wife of Paweł Zduński. She is married to Paweł Zduński and has two children: Adam Lewicki and Antoni Zduński. She was born in 1992. Her parents are unknown and believed to be dead. She was raised in Bukowina Tatrzańska. In 2010 or 2011, she fell pregnant with an unknown man. She went to New York to give birth to her son Adam, gave up her paternal rights and her son was adopted by Karol Lewicki and his wife Marta. Franciszka came back to Poland. In 2020, she was engaged to marry an older man. She escaped from a shop in Warsaw when she was buying her wedding dress and met Paweł Zduński. They started dating, engaged in 2021 and married in a religious ceremony in Bukowina Tatrzańska on 1 February 2022. On 17 May 2022 adopted parents of her son Adam called her to inform her that her son has an undisclosed illness and further decisions depends on family medical history. Franka agreed to help them, went to United States and contacted them. Franciszka has hidden from Paweł that she already has a child but he later learnt and forgave her. Adam Lewicki is not aware that Franciszka is his biological mother, but after their meeting Franciszka wants a contact with him. In April 2022 she was diagnosed with endometriosis and she and her husband (who doesn't have biological children) are struggling with conceiving a child on their own.

Adam Lewicki (Liam Culbreth) is a son of Franciszka Janik and her unknown partner. He was born on 6 December 2011 in New York, United States. Franciszka, who was then 19, gave up her paternal rights and Adam was adopted by Karol Lewicki and his wife, Marta Lewicka. Adam doesn't know that Franciszka is his biological mother. He lives in New York and came to Warsaw in September 2022 to meet Franciszka and her new husband, Piotr Zduński.

=== Lisiecki family ===
Andrzej Lisiecki (Tomasz Oświeciński) is an older brother of Bartosz Lisiecki. In the past he was married to Elżbieta but his marriage lasted only a few months. On 31 January 2017, he married his friend, Marzena Laskowska and they're expecting their first child. Status: present, living in Grabina. Marital status: married to Marzena Lisiecka since 2017.

Elżbieta Lisiecka (Anna Sarna) is a divorced first wife of Andrzej Lisiecki. She came to Grabina to stop Andrzej's wedding with Marzena Laskowska, saying that they're not divorced. Status: non-present since 2017. Marital status: divorced from Andrzej Lisiecki.

Marzena Lisiecka, born Laskowska (Olga Szomańska) is a second wife of Andrzej Lisiecki. She worked at Siedlisko with Urszula Lisiecka. Marzena gave birth to her daughter Kalina on 17 March 2020.

Kalina Lisiecka is a first child of Andrzej Lisiecki and his wife, Marzena Lisiecka. She was born on 17 March 2020, in Warsaw.

Bartosz Lisiecki (Arkadiusz Smoleński) is a younger brother of Andrzej Lisiecki. He is married to Dorota Kawecka since 2024 and was previously married to Jolanta Lisiecka and Urszula Mostowiak (2019-2023).

Dorota Lisiecka, born Kawecka (Dorota Rejzer) is a third wife of Bartosz Lisiecki. They married on 26 November 2024. She was previously married to Tomasz Kawecki.

Aniela (Elżbieta Kijowska) is a grandmother of Marzena Lisiecka and Beata. She made a testament and decreased her furtune to her only great-grandchild, Kalina Lisiecka.

Beata (Izabela Warykiewicz) is a half-sister of Marzena Lisiecka. She came to Grabina in 2021 after her sister's death and wanted to take care of her niece Kalina to take a decrease from her great-grandmother Aniela.

=== Łagoda family ===
Feliks Łagoda (born 1896, died 1960)
married Zofia

Zenon Łagoda (born 1936, died 2001), married unnamed woman

Maria Mostowiak (born 1960, daughter of Zenon Łagoda and Barbara Wrzodak, legal daughter of Lucjan Mostowiak)
married Krzysztof Zduński in 1984 (widowed 2006)
married Artur Rogowski in 2008 (divorced 2015), married again in 2018

Paweł Zduński (born 1984, Gródek)
married Joanna Liberadzka in 2011 (divorced 2012)
married Alicja Domańska in 2014 (divorced 2017)
married Katia Tatiszwili in 2018 (divorced 2018)
married Franciszka Janik in 2022
Piotr Zduński (born 1984, Gródek)
married Kinga Filarska in 2002/2009

Magdalena Zduńska (born 2008, Warsaw)
Mikołaj Zduński (born 2014, Warsaw)
Emilia Zduńska (born 2019, Warsaw)
Zuzanna Zduńska (born 2019, Warsaw)

Maria Zduńska (born 2001, died 2001, Gródek)
Barbara Rogowska (born 2009, Gródek)

Michał Łagoda (born 1974, died 2014)
married Małgorzata Mostowiak in 2003 (divorced 2004)
married Grażyna Raczyńska (divorced)
Marian Łagoda (died 2003)

Unnamed Starski (born Łagoda, brother of Feliks Łagoda)

Kamil Starski

Maciej Kalicki

Feliks Łagoda (never seen on screen) was a senior of Łagoda family. He was born in 1896 and died on 28 June 1960. He was married to Zofia Łagoda.

Zenon Łagoda (Emil Karewicz) was a first child of Feliks Łagoda and his wife, Zofia Łagoda. He was born on 14 June 1936. In 1960, he was engaged to marry Barbara Wrzodak but decided to move to United States. Unaware that Barbara was expecting his child, he broke the engagement off and emigrated. His daughter Maria was born in December 1960, but was raised as a daughter of Lucjan Mostowiak. In the United States, Zenon married a woman with whom he had a son, Michał Łagoda. In 2000 Zenon came back to Poland and owned a processing plant in Lipnica. In 2001 Barbara's daughter-in-law, Hanna Walisiak, spread the information that Zenon, not Lucjan, was Maria Zduńska's biological father. In June his biological daughter gave birth to a daughter Maria who died hours after birth. Zenon wanted to come back to United States but he suffered from a sudden heart attack and died on 17 November 2001. He was buried in Lipnica.

Michał Łagoda (Paweł Okraska) was a son of Zenon Łagoda and his unnamed wife. He was born on 18 August 1974. Michał came to Poland with his father in 2000. Accidentally, he met Małgorzata Mostowiak when he hit her while she was riding a bike. They started a relationship which was strained by Małgorzata's romance with Konrad Badecki and Michał's financial problems. In November 2001, Michał learnt that he had a paternal half-sister, Maria Zduńska and his father suddenly died. In September 2002 he became a godfather of Mateusz Mostowiak, Małgorzata's and Maria's nephew. In October 2002 Michał and Maria opened a water bottling plant in Lipnica. On 26 December 2002 Michał announced his engagement to Małgorzata Mostowiak. They married on 19 February 2003 and rented a house where they lived with Małgorzata's parents. In April 2003 a man claiming to be Michał's paternal uncle, visited Michał's house. A new guest was addicted to alcohol and was a thief. Michał threw his out of house in May 2003, despite thinking that he was an uncle. In May 2003 Michał got a letter from an American lawyer of his uncle, confirming that Marian Łagoda was terminally ill and staying in the United States. Michał realised that his guest was a fraud. In June 2003 Michał and his wife had a marital crisis which ended in Małgorzata's move to her brother's home in Grabina. In September 2003 Michał went to United States to take care of his uncle and left Małgorzata in Poland. In October 2003 Michał came to Poland to bury his uncle Marian in Lipnica. He admitted that the considered United States as his homeland. Michał wanted Małgorzata to move with him to America and it caused another conflict between them. In 2003 Michał's and Maria's water plant was taken over by Waldemar Jaroszy, who in January 2004 offered Michał director position. Michał apologized Małgorzata for leaving her, forgave her romance with Zbigniew Napiórkowski and they started a new chapter in their lives. However, Małgorzata discovered sex tapes Michał recorded with his male friend Grzegorz and filed for divorce. Their divorce was announced on 17 May 2004.

Marian Łagoda was a son of Feliks Łagoda and his wife, Zofia Łagoda. He died in October 2003 in the United States and was buried in Lipnica, Poland, next to his brother Zenon Łagoda.

Unnamed Starski, born Łagoda was a brother of Feliks Łagoda. He moved to United States and changed his surname to Starski.

Kamil Starski (Radosław Krzyżowski) was a grandson of Unnamed Starski. He died in 2019.

Maciej Kalicki (Aleksander Kaleta) is a son of Kamil Starski and his former partner, Miss Kalicka.

=== Marszałek family ===
Wojciech Marszałek (born 19 June 1954, died 2023, Emilian Kamiński) was a senior of Marszałek family. He was married to Halina Marszałek (?-2009) and Krystyna Filarska (2011-2023) and had one daughter, Magdalena Marszałek (born 1982). He died due to heart attack.

Halina Marszałek (Marta Klubowicz) was a first wife of Wojciech Marszałek. She was born on 9 April 1960. Halina died on 21 November 2009, after a long illness.

Krystyna Filarska-Marszałek (born 1956, Hanna Mikuć) is a widowed wife of Wojciech Marszałek and has one child, Kinga Filarska-Zduńska. She was previously married to Zbigniew Filarski (divorced). She currently lives in Warsaw and helps her daughter raising her four children.

Magdalena Budzyńska (born Marszałek, 14 September 1982, Anna Mucha) is a daughter of Wojciech Marszałek and his wife, Halina Marszałek. She is married to Andrzej Budzyński (2019-) and was previously married to Sasza Maksymowicz and Aleksander Chodakowski (2015-2017). She has one adopted son, Maciej Chodakowski (born 2006). In January 2014 she had a heart transplantation. Magdalena is a lawyer and workes in Warsaw. Since 2025, she lives in Warsaw with her husband.

Zuzanna Marszałek (Jolanta Fraszyńska) is a cousin of Wojciech Marszałek. She worked as a nanny of Magdalena Zduńska and Mikołaj Zduński. She was dating Zbigniew Filarski and Wiktor Żak (whom she met in a secondary school and then again in Warsaw in 2016). In May 2016 Zuzanna and Wiktor Żak moved together to Sweden.

Michał Marszałek is a brother of Zuzanna Marszałek.

=== Mostowiak family ===
Ludwik Mostowiak was a brother of Teodor Mostowiak and paternal uncle of Lucjan Mostowiak.

Teodor Mostowiak was a father of Lucjan Mostowiak and Hanna Smine. He was married to Maria Mostowiak.

Hanna Smine, born Mostowiak was a daughter of Teodor Mostowiak and his wife, Maria Mostowiak. She was born in 1922. Hanna was first declared missing after World War II. Her family looked for her through The Polish Red Cross and got the information that Hanna was dead. In April 2013 Hanna's brother Lucjan learnt that she survived the war, moved to United States, married there and had descendants. Hanna died in 1978.

Jane Bufford is a granddaughter of Hanna Smine. She was born in 1990 in the United States.

Lucjan Mostowiak (Witold Pyrkosz) was a son of Teodor Mostowiak and his wife, Maria Mostowiak. He was born on 19 December 1931 in Grabina. When he was 8, the World War II started. Lucjan survived but his sister was missing and later declared dead. Lucjan was arrested by Germans and his father had to pay soldiers for freeing him. Teodor Mostowiak stole money from neighbour Markowski and it led to Markowski's suicide. One of Lucjan's friends was Zenon Łagoda and they both were interested in Barbara Wrzodak. Barbara loved Zenon, they got engaged and Barbara fell pregnant. Zenon wanted her to make an abortion and left her, sure that she ended her pregnancy. In 1960 Lucjan took care of his pregnant neighbour, proposed to Barbara and they married in September 1960. Lucjan's parents were not happy with that marriage, mainly because of Barbara's out of wedlock pregnancy. In December 1960 Barbara gave birth to Maria, who was raised as Lucjan's daughter and had a surname Mostowiak. Lucjan had three more children with Barbara: Marta in April 1972, Marek in January 1978, Małgorzata in April 1980 and a stillborn son Filip in the 1960s. In 1980 in Grabina Lucjan helped to save a life of five years old girl, Hanna Walisiak, who was injured in a car accident caused by Waldemar Jaroszy. Hanna's parents died and Hanna was sure that Mostowiak was the one, who caused the accident and wanted a revenge on his family. Lucjan was injured as a result of saving Hanna. In a revenge in 2001 Hanna told Mostowiak family members that Maria was not Lucjan's daughter and it led to Zenon's heart attack and Maria's premature labour. Lucjan had learnt that Hanna married his son Marek to take their fortune and gave her his sad for leaving their family. However, Hanna and Marek had a happy marriage and members of a family forgave her. In April 2002 he lost consciousness in his sad and was hospitalized due to heart attack. For a few months Lucjan and his wife lived in a flat in Gródek but were unhappy there and missed their home. In February 2003 Lucjan and Barbara moved into a house rented by their daughter Małgorzata and her new husband, Michał Łagoda. When Michał left to United States, Lucjan and Barbara helped their daughter with work on her agrotourism farm. On 22 December 2003 Lucjan was hit by a car and saved by Waldemar Jaroszy. In February 2004, Lucjan and Barbara, angry that Małgorzata had a romance with Zbigniew Napiórkowski, decided to move out of their house and back to Grabina.

Barbara Mostowiak (born Wrzodak, 15 May 1940, Teresa Lipowska) is a matriarch of Mostowiak family. She was married to Lucjan Mostowiak (1964-2017) and has five children: Maria Mostowiak (born 1964), Marta Mostowiak (born 1972), Marek Mostowiak (born 1978), Małgorzata Mostowiak (born 1980) and Filip Mostowiak (stillborn). She lives in Grabina with her daughter and some members of her family.

Maria Rogowska (born Mostowiak, 24 December 1964 in Grabina, Małgorzata Pieńkowska) is a daughter of Zenon Łagoda and his former fiancee, Barbara Wrzodak; legal daughter of Lucjan Mostowiak. She is married to Artur Rogowski (2008-2015, 2018-) and was previously married to Krzysztof Zduński (1984-2005). She has four children: Piotr Zduński (born 1984), Paweł Zduński (born 1984), Maria Zduńska (born 2001, died 2001) and Barbara Rogowska (born 2009). She is a nurse and workes at a medical clinic in Lipnica. Maria was raised unaware that she was not Lucjan's biological daughter. She was 37 and heavily pregnant when she learnt from her sister-in-law, Hanna Mostowiak, that her biological father was Zenon Łagoda. A shocking information led to an unexpected birth of her daughter Maria who lived only few hours. Shortly after that Łagoda also died and Maria inherited his water processing plant in Lipnica. Since 2018, she lives in Grabina with her husband, mother and daughter.

Marta Milecka (born Mostowiak, 6 April 1972, Dominika Ostałowska) is a daughter of Lucjan Mostowiak and his wife, Barbara Wrzodak. She is married to Jacek Milecki (2003-2004, 2024-); was previously married to Norbert Wojciechowski (2005-2007) and Andrzej Budzyński (2012-2017). She has two children: Łukasz Wojciechowski (born 1993) and Anna Wojciechowska (born 2006). Marta is a lawyer and worked as a judge in Warsaw. In 2002 she was brutally attacked by a man whom she was judging and remained in a coma. From 2017 to 2018 she lived in Colombia with her children. Since 2025, she lives in Italy with her husband and her son's family.

Marek Mostowiak (born 4 January 1978, Kacper Kuszewski) is a son of Lucjan Mostowiak and his wife, Barbara Wrzodak. He is married to Ewa Kolęda (2015-) and was previously married to Hanna Walisiak (2001-2011). He has three children: Natalia Mostowiak (born 1996, adopted 2005), Urszula Mostowiak (born 1996, adopted 2008) and Mateusz Mostowiak (born 2002). Marek had different works, most notable as an owner of a pub in Lipnica and as a manager of a water plant, inherited by his sister Maria. Since 2018, Marek lives in Australia with his wife and stepson.

Natalia Mostowiak (born 21 March 1996, Marcjanna Lelek, Dominika Suchecka) is an adopted daughter of Marek Mostowiak and his wife, Hanna Walisiak. She was married to Franciszek Zarzycki (2017-2020) and has one daughter, Hanna (born 2015). Natalia works as a policewoman in Lipnica. She was raised in an orphanage in Józefowo.

Hanna Mostowiak (born 5 October 2015 in Grabina, Maja Marczak) is a daughter of Natalia Mostowiak and her former lover, Dariusz Maj. Her godparents are Urszula Mostowiak (her maternal aunt) and Franciszek Zarzycki (her mother's friend and later Hanna's legal father).

Urszula Mostowiak (born Jakubczyk, 2 September 1996, Iga Krefft) is an adopted daughter of Marek Mostowiak and his wife, Hanna Walisiak; biological daughter of Bronisław Jakubczyk and his unnamed wife. She was married to Bartosz Lisiecki (2019-2024) and has one foster daughter, Kalina Lisiecka (2020). Her biological mother was dead and her father was addicted to alcohol, unable to take care of his child. She was adopted by Mostowiak family in 2008. Since 2023, Urszula lives in Australia with her daughter.

Mateusz Mostowiak (born 3 April 2002 in Grabina, Krystian Domagała, Rafał Kowalski) is a son of Marek Mostowiak and his wife, Hanna Walisiak. Mateusz was christened on 24 September 2002 and his godparents were Małgorzata Mostowiak (his paternal aunt) and Michał Łagoda (her fiance). He was married to Lilianna Banach (2020-2022). In November 2002 Mateusz was kidnapped by Irena Gałązka, former adoptive mother of Hanna, who was obsessed with having a child on her own. He is currently studying at Military Academy in Warsaw and previously worked as a sailor.

Małgorzata Chodakowska (born Mostowiak, 8 April 1980, Joanna Koroniewska) is a daughter of Lucjan Mostowiak and his wife, Barbara Wrzodak. She was married to Michał Łagoda (2002-2004), Stefan Miller (2004-2005) and Tomasz Chodakowski (2009-2014) and has one son, Wojciech Chodakowski (2009). Małgorzata studied in Warsaw and is a landscape architect. In 2013, when she was still married to Tomasz, Małgorzata moved to United States with her son and her first husband, Michał Łagoda. They got engaged but just before their wedding they had a car accident in which Michał was killed and Małgorzata lost their unborn child. Since 2013, she lives in the United States and after joining a religious sect she has no contact with her family.

=== Nowicki family ===
Krystyna Cholak (Joanna Jędryka) was an accountant in a wholesaler owned by Krzysztof Zduński.

Janina Nowicka (Ewa Wencel) is a sister of Krystyna Cholak and mother of Ewa Nowicka.

Ewa Nowicka (Dominika Figurska) started her work as a secretary in Krzysztof Zduński's wholesaler in April 2002. Ewa and Krzysztof had a romance which led to a separation between Krzysztof and his wife, Maria Zduńska. In early 2003 Ewa fell pregnant and her mother accused Krzysztof that he was child's father. Ewa was hospitalized in September 2003 because she collapsed. She gave birth to her daughter Aleksandra on 10 November 2003 in Gródek. A girl was born in critical condition and Krzysztof Zduński donated his blood to her. Ewa confessed that child's father was Leszek Skalski. In May 2004 Ewa started work in a medical clinic owned by Janusz Kotowicz. They became dating in November 2004.

Aleksandra Skalska is a daughter of Leszek Skalski and his then former lover, Ewa Nowicka. She was born on 10 November 2003 prematurely and in critical condition. Krzysztof Zduński, who then became her godfather, was believed to be her father and donated his blood to her.

=== Popławski-Modry family ===
Stanisław Popławski (Sławomir Holland) is a policeman from Lipnica. He got engaged to Krystyna Banach in 2022 and they married on 8 November 2022.

Krystyna Popławska is a wife of Stanisław Popławski. She was previously married to Krzysztof Banach and has two children, Liliana and ?.

Alicja Modra was a sister of Józef Modry. She had one child, Jagoda.

Józef Modry lives in Lipnica and is an uncle of Jagoda Kiemlicz.

Jagoda Kiemlicz (Katarzyna Kołeczewek) is a daughter of Stanisław Popławski and his former partner, Alicja Modra.

Tadeusz Kiemlicz (Bartłomiej Nowosielski) is a husband of Jagoda Kiemlicz.

Dorota Kiemlicz (born 4 March 2025 in Warsaw) is a daughter of Tadeusz Kiemlicz and his wife, Jagoda Kiemlicz. During pregnancy, she was diagnosed with heart disease and operated before birth.

=== Tarnowski family ===
Adam Tarnowski (Juliusz Krzysztof Warunek) is a senior of Tarnowski family. He was born in 1958.

Dorota Tarnowska (Katarzyna Żak) was a wife of Adam Tarnowski. In a past she was diagnosed with a cancer and recovered after her daughter stole money from the casino she worked. Later, she was diagnosed with a pancreatic cancer and died on 1 June 2015.

Joanna Chodakowska, born Tarnowska (Barbara Kurdej-Szatan) is a first child of Adam Tarnowski and his wife, Dorota Tarnowska. She was born on 15 March 1987. She worked in United States as a nanny of Wojciech Chodakowski. After his mother, Małgorzata Chodakowska, and her fiance, Michał Łagoda, had a car accident, she took care of Wojciech and later took him to Poland. Joanna fell in love with Tomasz Chodakowski and they married on 28 March 2017. Tomasz unfortunately died on 11 September 2017. Joanna lives in Warsaw and raises Wojciech Chodakowski. On 6 December 2021, she got engaged to Leszek Krajewski.

=== Walisiak family ===
Władysław Walisiak was a senior of Walisiak family. He was born in 1947. In his youth Władysław was dating Wanda Kalicka but married her younger sister, Maria Kalicka. They had one child, Hanna, born in 1975. In 1980 Walisiak family came home from a party in a car driven by Waldemar Jaroszy. Jaroszy had no driving license and caused an accident with Lucjan and Barbara Mostowiak. Władysław and Maria died as a result and Hanna had to live in an orphanage. In 1978 Władysław had a child out of wedlock, Anna Gruszyńska.

Maria Walisiak, born Kalicka was a wife of Władysław Walisiak. She was born in 1949 and died in a car accident in 1980. She had one daughter, Hanna, and has never learnt that her husband had also a daughter out of wedlock.

Hanna Mostowiak, born Walisiak (Małgorzata Kożuchowska) was a daughter of Władysław Walisiak and his wife, Maria Walisiak. Hanna took part in a car accident in 1980, caused by Waldemar Jaroszy, where her parents were killed. She was rescued by Lucjan Mostowiak, but was convinced that Mostowiak was the one who caused an accident and wanted a revenge on him. Hanna moved to an orphanage in Józefowo where she met her best friend, Jolanta Kowalska. She was temporary adopted by Irena Gałązka and her husband who couldn't have children on their own. When after the adoption Irena fell pregnant, they turned Hanna back to an orphanage. However, Irena lost her biological child and started to have psychiatric symptoms. In November 2000 Hanna worked as a waitress in a local pub in Lipnica and she met Marek Mostowiak. Lucjan's broke off his engagement to Katarzyna Wójcik to start a romance with Hanna. Hanna and Marek soon became engaged and married in a secret civil ceremony in 2001. Hanna wanted to sell Mostowiaks'ground to Zenon Łagoda and was fired from work. Also, Marek decided to end their marriage and Hanna met her former boyfriend, Jan Rogowski. Hanna revealed to Maria Zduńska that her biological father was not Lucjan, but Zenon Łagoda. She then felt guilty, because Zenon died from a sudden heart attack and Maria lost her stillborn daughter. When separated with Marek, Hanna discovered that she was expecting his child. She attempted a suicide but was rescued. Hanna met Irena Gałązka, her former adoptive mother, who offered her work and living in her house. Marek decided not to divorce Hanna. Jan Rogowski warned Hanna that she cannot feel safe living with Gałązka and was arrested for coming into Gałązka's house. Hanna, scared, escaped from Gałązka and was hospitalized because stress influenced her pregnancy. Hanna agreed to come back to her husband and their house in Grabina. On 3 April 2002 Hanna gave birth to their son Mateusz Mostowiak in Grabina. Hanna and Marek married in a religious wedding on 24 September 2002. Their reception was broken by Katarzyna Wójcik who announced that she was expecting Marek's child. Katarzyna then miscarried and it was revealed that she lied to regain Marek. Hanna had a nervous breakdown after her son Mateusz was kidnapped by Irena Gałązka in November 2002. In January 2003 Hanna started taking German language lessons from her new neighbour, Stefan Miller. In September 2003 Hanna took part in a meeting of people who lived in an orphanage in Józefowo in the past. There, she met her first boyfriend, Marcin Polański-Van Burgen. Hanna left her husband and son because her strong feelings to Marcin revived. She was hiding with him. Marcin, diagnosed with last stage of leukemia, died in October 2003, leaving Hanna heartbroken. Hanna, after talking with her mother-in-law, came back to her husband in Grabina but her marriage strained after her betrayal. Mateusz's accident in November 2003 led to Hanna and Marek's reconciliation. In January 2004 Hanna agreed to run a foundation with Waldemar Jaroszy. A foundation, called Serce dziecka, was projected to help children from orphanages. In March 2004, Hanna met Natalia, a girl from Józefowo orphanage, who was suffering from colitis ulcerosa. Hanna helped her through foundation. Hanna had an idea to adopt Natalia and talked about that with Marek but he was shocked at first reaction. In October 2004 Hanna discovered that Waldemar Jaroszy was making financial frauds in their foundation.

Anna Gruszyńska (Tamara Arciuch) is a daughter of Władysław Walisiak from his extramarital relationship with an unnamed woman. For some time she lived in Grabina before moving to France. She was previously married and divorced. She was later engaged to Adam Werner.

Wanda Kalicka (Grażyna Marzec) was an older sister of Maria Walisiak and maternal aunt of Hanna Mostowiak. She was born in 1945. Wanda dated Władysław Kalisiak but he chose to marry her sister. In 1980 her sister and brother-in-law died in a car accident and Wanda refused to take care of their daughter resulting in Hanna living in an orphanage. She moved to Germany and was thought to be dead. In 2004 Hanna learnt that her aunt was still living and sick. Mostowiak went to Germany and took her aunt to Grabina. It was later revealed that Kalicka had much money but posed that she was poor. She came back to Germany to take care of one of her former wards, Erika.

=== Wojciechowski family ===
Kazimierz Wojciechowski (never seen on screen) was a senior of Wojciechowski family.

Henryk Wojciechowski (Tadeusz Chudecki) was a first child of Kazimierz Wojciechowski and his first wife. He was born in 1961. He lived with his widowed sister-in-law, Marta Wojciechowska and her two children. Henryk was dating Matylda Górska. He married his girlfriend Nina.

Norbert Wojciechowski (Mariusz Sabiniewicz) was a son of Kazimierz Wojciechowski and his unnamed wife. He was born in 1967. In the early 1990s he was dating Marta Mostowiak. In October 1993 their son Łukasz was born. He was fighting for his life. Norbert refuse to give his blood to Łukasz and left his family. As a result, Marta raised Łukasz as a single mother and told him that his father was dead. Wojciechowski worked abroad and he came back in 2000 as a famous politician. When a press reported that he had a child born out of wedlock, Łukasz learnt that he was Wojciechowski's son and they met. Norbert was closer to Marta and they fell in love again. He proposed on 21 May 2002. It was revealed that he was previously married in a religious ceremony to an unnamed woman and later divorced. In December 2002 Marta broke their engagement off after he announced in a TV interview that he was moving with his family to New York, without informing Marta. Norbert moved to United States but still had contact with Łukasz and took him on different trips. During one of them, on 13 May 2003, they had a car accident. Norbert saved Łukasz's life but he was left paralyzed from waist down. His state of health caused him to live in Poland. In October 2003 he met Magdalena Rudnik, divorced sister of Jacek Milecki, his longtime rival and Marta's fiancee. Magdalena and Norbert fell in love with each other. In December 2003 he started work as a professor on university in Warsaw. Magdalena left Norbert in early 2004 after she renewed contact with her former partner Roman. In late 2004 Norbert was in a friendship with his student, Klara Sobieszczańska.

Łukasz Wojciechowski, born Mostowiak (Franciszek Żuchewicz) is a son of Norbert Wojciechowski and his then former fiancee, Marta Mostowiak. He was born on 9 October 1993 in Warsaw. After birth, Łukasz needed a blood transusion and Norbert refused to give him his blood. Wojciechowski moved to United States and left Marta and their son. Łukasz was raised by his single mother, who told him that his father was dead. His godfather was Krzysztof Zduński. In June 2001 Łukasz accidentally learnt from a newspaper that he was a son of a famous political who came back to Warsaw from United States in late 2000. Shocked with a news, he escaped. Łukasz met his father and they built a father-son relationship. In May 2002 Łukasz's parents engaged to get married. Their split in December 2002 caused Łukasz a lot of stress. Łukasz was still meeting his father and visited him in the United States. On 13 May 2003 they were injured in a car accident - Norbert saved Łukasz's life but was left paralyzed from waist down.

Natalia Wojciechowska is a daughter of Łukasz Wojciechowski and his former lover, Katia Tatiszwili. She was born on 9 March 2020 and is half-Georgian through her mother.

Jan Lucjan Norbert Wojciechowski is a son of Łukasz Wojciechowski and his lover, Patrycja Argasińska. He was born on 22 March 2022 in Warsaw. Łukasz and Patrycja had a romance while she was married to Jerzy Argasiński, a doctor. She fell pregnant by Łukasz, but Łukasz learnt that she was expecting his child on Jan's day of birth. A boy was named Jan (after his maternal grandfather), Norbert (after his deceased paternal grandfather, Norbert Wojciechowski) and Lucjan (after his deceased paternal great-grandfather, Lucjan Mostowiak).

Anna Wojciechowska is a daughter of Norbert Wojciechowski and his then wife, Marta Wojciechowska. She was born on 14 February 2006 in Warsaw and named after her brother's favourite teacher.

=== Zakrzewski family ===
Renata Zakrzewska (Hanna Bieluszko) is a doctor who worked in medical clinic in Gródek with Maria Zduńska and Janusz Kotowicz since 2003. Renata became friends with Maria. She had financial troubles after in early 2004 after another conflict her daughter escaped from home. Maria lent money to Renata to pay for detective. Renata and her husband Robert was temporary estranged. In October 2004 Renata discovered that she was pregnant with her second child.

Justyna Zakrzewska (Izabela Małota) is a daughter of Renata Zakrzewska and her husband. Justyna and her mother often were arguing when Justyna was a teenager.

=== Zduński family ===
Jadwiga Zduńska-Jabłońska, primo voto Zduńska, secundo voto Jabłońska (Barbara Horowianka) is a senior of Zduński family. Her first husband, Mr. Zduński, was a dentist. Jadwiga had two children with him: Krzysztof (born in 1958) and Renata. Her daughter Renata died as an infant because of SIDS. Zduńska wanted Krzysztof to become a doctor like his father. She was angry when he stopped his studies to marry his pregnant daughter Maria Mostowiak and they ended their contact. Jadwiga didn't like her daughter-in-law. On 17 March 2001 Jadwiga was diagnosed with stroke and hospitalized. She renewed contact with her son and met her grandchildren. Zduńska later moved to Krzysztof's and Maria's flat in Gródek where Maria took care of her. In November 2002, when her health improved, she met Karol Jabłoński (Stanisław Brudny), a boarder in a senior's house where she chose to live.

Renata Zduńska (never seen on screen) was a daughter of Jadwiga Zduńska and her first husband, Mr. Zduński. She died as an infant.

Krzysztof Zduński (Cezary Morawski) is a first child of Jadwiga Zduńska and her first husband, Mr. Zduński. He was born on 13 February 1953. His father was a dentist and Krzysztof studied medicine to become a doctor. When his girlfriend, Maria Mostowiak, fell pregnant, he quit his studies and married her. They had twin sons in February 1984, Piotr Zduński and Paweł Zduński. In 2000, Krzysztof owned a small company, but he had debts. He borrowed money from young men who later blackmailed him. He was suspected of a murder but acquitted. In June 2001 his wife Maria gave birth to their third child, daughter named Maria, who died few hours after birth because heart disease. In 2001 Maria inherited a processing plant from her biological father Zenon Łagoda and Krzysztof started to manage it with his former business partner, Tomasz Kozielski. Zduński and Kozielski discovered that plant's workers steal money from firm. Then he lost his trust to Kozielski and Maria started managing a plant. Her success caused a major crisis in their marriage. Since April 2002 Krzysztof had a romance with Ewa Nowicka, a young secretary in a wholesaler. In June 2002 Krzysztof filed for divorce. In October 2002 a wholesaler was sold by its owner Renata Kozielska, so Zduński lost his work and money. Krzysztof and his wife reconciled in October 2002, but two months later, after an accidental meeting, Krzysztof started seeing Ewa Nowicka again. In January 2003 Zduński opened video cassette rental Casablanca. In April 2003 he learnt that Ewa Nowicka was expecting his child. Krzysztof helped Ewa through her pregnancy and gave his blood to daughter Aleksandra who was born on 10 November 2003. Ewa confessed that her father's daughter was Leszek Skalski. In January 2004 he agreed to be Aleksandra's godfather. In March Krzysztof agreed to work at firm producing windows, owned by Zbigniew Filarski, Piotr's father-in-law. In first months at his new work Krzysztof had many successes. A crisis came when in September 2004 client cheated Zduński and Filarski wanted him to pay a lot of money for that.

Piotr Zduński (born 18 February 1984, Marcin Mroczek) is a son of Krzysztof Zduński and his wife, Maria Mostowiak. He is married to Kinga Filarska (2003-) and has four children: Magdalena Zduńska (born 2008), Mikołaj Zduński (born 2014), Emilia Zduńska (born 2019) and Zuzanna Zduńska (born 2019). He is a lawyer and workes in a law firm in Warsaw, co-owned by his former uncle, Andrzej Budzyński. Piotr met his future wife, Kinga, in a secondary school in Gródek but he was not accepted by her parents. They decided to marry in a secret civil ceremony in 2003. In 2008 Kinga and Piotr won a big prize at a lottery and bought a house at Deszczowa Street in Warsaw. In 2023 Piotr suffered from a heart attack, at a young age, like his father. Since 2003, he lives in Warsaw with his wife and children.

Magdalena Zduńska (born 15 November 2008 in Warsaw) is a daughter of Piotr Zduński and his wife, Kinga Filarska. She was christened on 15 November 2009 in Warsaw and her godparents are Paweł Zduński (her paternal uncle) and Magdalena Marszałek (her mother's friend and later stepsister).

Mikołaj Zduński (born 6 May 2014 in Warsaw) is a son of Piotr Zduński and his wife, Kinga Filarska. He was christened on 8 September 2014 in Warsaw and his godparents are Ireneusz Podleśny and Mirosława Kwiatkowska (his parents' friends).

Emilia Zduńska (born 25 February 2019 in Warsaw) is a daughter of Piotr Zduński and his wife, Kinga Filarska. She was christened on 12 March 2019 in Warsaw and her godparents are Andrzej Budzyński (her father's former uncle) and Anna Waszkiewicz (her parents' friend).

Zuzanna Zduńska (born 25 February 2019 in Warsaw) is a daughter of Piotr Zduński and his wife, Kinga Filarska. She was christened on 12 March 2019 in Warsaw and her godparents are Andrzej Budzyński (her father's former uncle) and Anna Waszkiewicz (her parents' friend).

Paweł Zduński is a son of Krzysztof Zduński and his wife, Maria Zduńska. He was born in February 1984. Paweł was a student of secondary school in Gródek but was fired in 2001 when he changed with his brother to pass an exam. Paweł resigned from continuuing his education and started his work as a car mechanic in Gródek. In March 2002 Paweł discovered that workshop where he worked was a warehouse of stolen car parts and called the police. Zduński was accused of stealing the parts and arrested. Since September 2002 he worked at his mother's processing plant in Lipnica. In February 2003 Paweł started a romance with his distant cousin, Teresa Makowska, who was married and escaped from her aggressive husband. In April 2003 he was hospitalized after an accident. He loved Teresa, but she split with him in April 2003, forced by his mother, who didn't approve a romantic relationship between her son and older married woman with a child and also between cousins. She lied that she didn't love Paweł. In May 2003, Paweł was a witness at secret civil wedding of his brother and he met there Anna Waszkiewicz, Kinga's and Piotr's classmate. Paweł and Anna started dating. Unexpectedly, in September 2003 Teresa came to Gródek and confessed Paweł that she was in love with him. In November Paweł decided to move in a flat with Teresa in Gródek. He went to Szczecin to meet Teresa's husband who forbade her meeting their daughter. Paweł fought for Teresa but she was undecided between living with Paweł or her husband. Paweł, tired with situation, left her. The reconciled again and when their lives with Agnieszka was happy, Paweł got a call for a military service and was forced to leave house. Teresa missed Paweł's oatch because her daughter was suddenly admitted to a hospital with appendicitis. In June 2004, when Teresa decided to reconcile with her husband and left Paweł, Paweł tried to commit a suicide by shooting. He shoot himself but was saved.

Antoni Lucjan Zduński (born 1 March 2025 in Warsaw) is a son of Paweł Zduński and his fourth wife, Franciszka Janik. He is named after his paternal stepgreat-grandfather, Lucjan Mostowiak.

Maria Zduńska was a daughter of Krzysztof Zduński and his wife, Maria Zduńska. Her mother's labour started suddenly and too early when she learnt that her biological father was Zenon Łagoda. Maria was born in 2001 in a hospital in Gródek and died few hours later. She was quickly christened and named Maria after her mother.

== Minor families ==
=== Argasiński family ===
Jerzy Argasiński (Karol Strasburger) is a professor of medicine and works at a medical clinic in Warsaw. He is married to Iwona Kryńska since 2024. He was previously married to Patrycja Argasińska; they divorced in September 2022 after Patrycja gave birth to another man's child.

Patrycja Argasińska (Alżbeta Lenska) is a lawyer from Warsaw. She was married to Jerzy Argasiński until 2022 and has one child, Jan Wojciechowski. In 2021 she had a romance with Łukasz Wojciechowski, which resulted in pregnancy and divorce. She is currently in a relationship with Łukasz and lives in Italy since 2023 with him and their son.

Iwona Argasińska (Hanna Śleszyńska) is a second wife of Jerzy Argasiński since 2024. She was previously married to Robert Kryński and has one child, Aneta.

=== Banach family ===
Krzysztof Banach
married Krystyna (divorced)

Liliana Banach (born 2002, daughter of Krystyna Banach and Jacek Kotowski, legal daughter of Krzysztof Banach)
married Mateusz Mostowiak in 2020 (divorced 2022)
Kamil Banach

Krzysztof Banach (January Brunov) is a patriarch of Banach family.

Krystyna Popławska (Dorota Chotecka-Pazura) is a divorced wife of Krzysztof Banach. In her youth, she worked as a prostitute. The she married Krzysztof Banach, and they had two children: Liliana and Kamil. It was later revealed that Liliana's biological father was Jacek Kotowski. Krzysztof Banach used a domestic violence against his wife and children and Krystyna decided to divorce him. Krystyna now works at Artur Rogowski's medical clinic as a cleaning lady. In 2022 she got engaged to Stanisław Popławski. They married on 8 November 2022.

Liliana Mostowiak, born Banach (Monika Mielnicka) is a daughter of Jacek Kotowski and Krystyna Banach and legal daughter of Krzysztof Banach. She was a classmate of Mateusz Mostowiak and lived with her family in Lipnica. Her father used a domestic violence. In late 2019 she was raped by Daniel and fell pregnant. Mateusz Mostowiak decided to take care of her and raise her child as his own. In March 2020 Liliana miscarried. She married Mostowiak on 21 April 2020. In January 2021 she learnt that her biological father was Jacek Kotowski. Liliana had a romance with Australian Ethan Anderson, who is fifteen years her senior and has a daughter. She left Mateusz and decided to divorce him and to marry her new partner. On 30 May 2022 Liliana came back to Grabina to live with her mother; she told that Anderson had beat her and left her for another woman. She and Mateusz divorced on 8 November 2022.

Kamil Banach is a second child and first son of Krzysztof Banach and his wife, Krystyna Banach. He lives in Lipnica.

=== Budzyński family ===
Tadeusz Budzyński (born 1929, died 2012)
Wanda Budzyńska (born 1953)

Andrzej Budzyński (born 1974)
married Marta Mostowiak in 2012 (divorced 2017)
married Magdalena Marszałek in 2020

Piotr Bielak (born 2003, son of Andrzej Budzyński and Edyta Bielak, legal son of Janusz Bielak)

Tadeusz Budzyński was a brother of Wanda Budzyńska. He was born in 1929 and died in 2012. She met Irena Malanowska, a woman whom he loved in his youth, and moved with her to Kraków.

Wanda Budzyńska (Maria Rybarczyk) is a mother of Andrzej Budzyński. She was born in 1956. Wanda has one brother, Tadeusz Budzyński. She is a lawyer and a judge. She was dating Jerzy Kolęda (2014-2015).

Andrzej Budzyński (Krystian Wieczorek) is an only child of Wanda Budzyńska and her unnamed husband. He was born on 17 November 1973. In 2003 he had a son, Piotr Bielak, with his married lover, Edyta Bielak. He hasn't known about him and met him later. Piotr was raised as a son of Edyta's husband. Andrzej married Marta Wojciechowska on 16 January 2012, and became a stepfather to her two children. They divorced in May 2017 after Marta moved to Colombia. He then started dating Magdalena Marszałek and they married on 7 January 2020. Andrzej is a stepfather to Magdalena's son, Maciej Chodakowski. Julia Malicka, with whom Andrzej had a romance in 2022, is claiming, that she's expecting his child. That news led to the break of his marriage to Magda.

=== Domański family ===
Stefan Domański (Zbigniew Waleryś) is a patriarch of Domański family. He was born in 1955. He has a daughter, Alicja Domańska. For many years Stefan had been a tramp. He met his granddaughter Barbara Domańska and they become friends.

Jerzy Domański (Michał Czernecki) is a son of Stefan Domański and biological father of Barbara Zduńska. He was married to Alicja but they later divorced and he didn't have a contact with his child. Barbara is now raised as a child of Paweł Zduński. He was born in 1979.

Alicja Domańska, primo voto Domańska, secundo voto Zduńska was a wife of Jerzy Domański. She was born on 18 October 1985 and has one sister, Olga. She married Jerzy Domański and they had a daughter, Barbara in July 2006. Jerzy later left Alicja and their child and Barbara was raised without knowing her father. Alicja later married Paweł Zduński, who became Barbara's foster father. Alicja than had a romance with Mark, fell pregnant and divorced Paweł in 2018. She gave birth to a son and lives in London, England with Basia being raised by Paweł Zduński.

Barbara Zduńska, born Domańska (Gabriela Raczyńska) is a daughter of Jerzy Domański and his then wife, Alicja Domańska, and foster daughter of Paweł Zduński. She was born on 15 July 2006. Her parents split when she was an infant and she didn't know her biological father. She was the one who met Alicja with Paweł Zduński.

=== Jaszewski family ===
Mariusz Jaszewski (Tomasz Lulek) is a father of Dawid Jaszewski. He is married to Olga Jaszewska. In 2021, he caused a car accident in which Andrzej Lisiecki and his wife Marzena Lisiecka, were killed. He was then arrested.

Olga Jaszewska (Małgorzata Lewińska) is a mother of Dawid Jaszewski.

Dawid Jaszewski (Iwo Wiciński) is a son of Mariusz Jaszewski and his wife, Olga Jaszewska. He is dating Barbara Rogowska.

=== Kotowicz family ===
Janusz Kotowicz (Marek Kalita) is a doctor from Gródek. In September 2003 he opened an own medical clinic in Gródek and offered Maria Zduńska work as a nurse. They had known each other from work in hospital. Janusz's wife died in 2001 due to illness. Since March 2004 he had a brief romance with Zuzanna (Joanna Liszowska), an attractive nurse who worked in his clinic. In November 2004 he started a relationship with Ewa Nowicka.

=== Kotowski family ===
Jacek Kotowski (Mariusz Sobczak) is a biological father of Liliana Banach. He was raised in Grabina or near Grabina. He attended the same primary school as Maria Mostowiak and they fell in love with each other when they were teenagers. Their relationship was broken due to Kotowski's emigration to Canada. In Canada, Kotowski married and later divorced. In 2002, he had a daughter, Liliana, with his married lover, Krystyna Banach. He was not aware that Krystyna was pregnant, Liliana was raised as a daughter of Krzysztof Banach, and Kotowski learnt about his paternity in 2021. He came back from Canada in November 2020 and met Maria in Lipnica medical clinic.

=== Kryński family ===
Robert Kryński is a head of Kryński family. His first wife was Iwona Kryńska and they had a daughter, Aneta. Then he married for a second time to an unnamed woman and had another daughter, Karolina.

Iwona Kryńska (Hanna Śleszyńska) is a mother of Aneta Kryńska. Her friend is her daughter's mother-in-law, Aleksandra Chodakowska. In late 2023 she started a relationship with Jerzy Argasiński.

Aneta Chodakowska, born Kryńska (Ilona Janyst) is a daughter of Robert Kryński and his first wife, Iwona Kryńska. She is married to Aleksander Chodakowski and has a son, Borys Chodakowski. Aneta works as a doctor in a medical clinic owned by Jerzy Argasiński. In September 2022 she learnt that her patient, Karolina, was in fact her paternal half-sister from her father's secret second marriage.

Karolina Kubiak (Oliwia Motyka-Radłowska) is a daughter of Robert Kryński and his second wife. She is a professional footballer and Aneta Chodakowska was her doctor when she had a few injuries.

=== Lewiński family ===
Izabela Lewińska (born 1985)
married Artur Skalski in 2018 (widowed 2019)
married Marcin Chodakowski in 2020 (divorced 2023)
married Radosław in 2024

Maja Chodakowska (born 2017)

Izabela Lewińska (born 16 July 1985, created by Adriana Kalska) is a curator from Warsaw. She was engaged to Artur Skalski when she met Marcin Chodakowski. Izabela was Marcin's curator, because he had troubles with raising his orphanated son Szymon. Izabela and Marcin fell in love and their daughter Maja was born in November 2017. Izabela was kidnapped by Artur and forced to marry him in May 2018. Artur was killed in September 2019 by Marcin's brother, Aleksander Chodakowski. Izabela got engaged to Marcin in January 2020 and they married on 24 March 2020. Their marriage was broken by Izabela's romance with Radosław and she divorced Chodakowski on 24 October 2023. Iza and Radosław got engaged on 12 December 2023. They married in a civil ceremony in Warsaw on 5 March 2024.

=== Makowski family ===
Tadeusz Makowski (Mariusz Drężek) is a former husband of Teresa and father of Agnieszka. He came to Gródek in February 2003 and threatened Teresa a death if she doesn't come back with him to Szczecin.

Teresa Makowska (Joanna Sydor) is a distant cousin of Barbara Mostowiak. She lived in Szczecin with her husband and daughter. Her husband was using a domestic violence and beating him. In January 2003 Teresa escaped from Szczecin with her daughter to her Mostowiak relatives in Gródek. She started work at Krzysztof Zduński's video cassette rental. In February 2003 Teresa started a romance with Paweł Zduński. Their relationship was not accepted by family members because they were distant cousins. In May 2003, Teresa, forced by Paweł's mother, split with him. In September 2003 Teresa unexpectedly came back to Gródek and confessed his love to Paweł. However, Paweł was at the time dating Anna Waszkiewicz. When Anna discovered that Paweł still loved Teresa, they split. In November 2003 Makowska filed for a divorce from her husband. She started to live with Paweł, but her daughter was still in Szczecin. Teresa worked as a waitress. In December Paweł went to Szczecin to talk with Teresa's husband to allow her to meeting her daughter. Paweł, who fought for Teresa, left her in December 2003 because he couldn't stand that he was undecided between living with him or her husband. In 2004 they reconciled, Teresa lived with Paweł but without her daughter and worked in a supermarket. Agnieszka, Teresa's daughter, joined them later. When their family was stable and happy, Paweł got a call for military service and was forced to leave home. Teresa missed his oath because her daughter was admitted to hospital. Makowska in June 2004 decided to come back to her husband and it led to Paweł trying to commit a suicide.

Agnieszka Makowska (Justyna Rabińska) is a daughter of Teresa Makowska and her husband. She was raised in Szczecin. In January 2003 she came to Grabina with her mother, escaping from her aggressive father. From 2004 she lived with her mother and mother's partner, Paweł Zduński, in Warsaw. She was also meeting her father. In May 2004 she was operated because of appendicitis.

=== Milecki family ===
Jacek Milecki (Robert Gonera) is a lawyer. Since 2000, he was in a relationship with Marta Mostowiak. They struggled due to Jacek's gambling. In May 2002 Marta got engaged to her former boyfriend and father of her son, Norbert Wojciechowski. Jacek became friends with Urszula (Anna Zagórska), a judge. He comforted her after her father's passing in June 2002. Urszula was in love with Jacek, but he had no feelings towards her. In December he renewed romance with Marta Mostowiak after she broke off her engagement. Due to his different problems, Jacek lost his rights to work as an advocate but he regained it in early 2003. Jacek and Marta were in a happy relationship again. They married on 10 November 2003 in Warsaw. In December Jacek told Marta that he was infertile - he has hidden it from her before their wedding. In January 2004 Jacek went to Moscow for a few months because of his work and stopped his contact with Marta. In March he was reported missing and Marta was conceived that he had a romance with his chef Iwona Majer. Jacek married Marta again in a civil ceremony in Gródek on 16 December 2024 with Maria Rogowska and Łukasz Wojciechowski as their witnesses.

Magdalena Rudnik is a sister of Jacek Milecki. She is estranged from her husband and has three sons. Since 2001, she was being treated for oncological disease. In early 2003 she was in a relationship with Roman and he moved into her flat. Magdalena's children were unhappy because Roman was aggressive towards them. When she decided to split with him, he didn't want to move out of her flat. In September 2003 Magdalena escaped from her flat with her children. Marta Mostowiak and Jacek helped her. In October 2003 Magdalena met Norbert Wojciechowski. Their friendship developed into a romance. They lived together but Magdalena renewed contact with her former partner Roman in early 2004 and left Norbert.

Adam Rudnik is a son of Magdalena Rudnik and her unnamed former husband.

Jan Rudnik is a son of Magdalena Rudnik and her unnamed former husband.

=== Miller family ===
Simona Miller (Agnieszka Fitkau-Perepeczko) is a mother of Stefan Miller. She came from Germany to Grabina in May 2003 to meet her son and his fiancée, Jolanta Kowalska. Simona's husband came with her (Jacek Bursztynowicz) but his name was not revealed.

Stefan Miller (Steffen Moller) is a German who moved to Grabina in November 2002. In December 2002 his house was firing and Marek Mostowiak helped him. In early 2003 Stefan started to give German language lessons to Hanna Mostowiak and met her friend, Jolanta Kowalska. They started dating and got engaged in March 2003. In June 2003, Jolanta broke their engagement off, because she met her former boyfriend, Andrzej, and confessed her love to him. Stefan, who became friends with Marek and Hanna, met Marek's sister, Małgorzata Łagoda. After developing a friendship, in September 2003 he confessed to Marek that he was in love with Małgorzata. In December 2003 Jolanta Kowalska came to Stefan, aplogized him for escaping from a church and admitted that it was a mistake. In March 2004 Stefan, unhappy that Małgorzata reconciled with her husband, went to Germany with Marek Mostowiak to run a pub owned by his sick uncle. In September 2004 Stefan and Marek opened their own pub in Lipnica. One of their waitresses, Elżbieta (Monika Obara) wanted to pick up Stefan but he was still in love with Małgorzata.

=== Olszewski family ===
Agnieszka Olszewska (Magdalena Walach) is a public prosecutor and former fiancée of Tomasz Chodakowski. She was born in 1978 in Szczecin. She met Chodakowski at a secondary school in Szczecin. They were even engaged but she decided to split with him. Agnieszka came to Warsaw as a widowed woman and met Chodakowski again. She was in love triangle with his wife, Małgorzata Chodakowska. In 2011 she fell pregnant after a one-night stand with Andrzej Budzyński, but later miscarried. On 23 February 2016, her daughter Helena Chodakowska was born. In September 2017 Tomasz Chodakowski died. In April 2020 Agnieszka and her daughter moved to Szczecin.

=== Rogowski family ===
Artur Rogowski (born 8 August 1967, Robert Moskwa) is a senior of Rogowski family. He is married to Maria Mostowiak (2008-2015, 2018-) and has two children: Agnes Rotke and Barbara Rogowska (born 2009). He studied medicine in Warsaw and Hamburg. In 2025 Artur learnt that he had another daughter, Agnes Rotke, from his relationship with German student, Elsa Meyer. He is a doctor and owns a medical clinic in Lipnica. Since 2018, he lives in Grabina with his wife, daughter and mother-in-law.

Agnes Rotke (Amanda Mincewicz) is a daughter of Artur Rogowski and his then partner, Elsa Meyer. After the death of her mother in 2025 she came to Grabina to meet her biological father and inform him that she was his daughter. She is a doctor and workes at her father's medical clinic in Lipnica since 2026. Since 2026, she lives in Grabina with her father and his family.

Barbara Rogowska (born 3 November 2009 in Gródek, Karina Woźniak) is a daughter of Artur Rogowski and his wife, Maria Mostowiak. After the birth, she was kidnapped by Aleksander Radoszy, a man who was obsessed with her mother. She was saved by her grandmother, Barbara Mostowiak, and named after her. Since 2018, she lives i Grabina with her family.

Agata Rogowska (Katarzyna Kwiatkowska) is a sister of Artur Rogowski. She is a doctor. She was married and lived in Norway for many years. Then she divorced her husband and came back to Poland. She started her work in Lipnica with her brother and sister-in-law. She was dating Artur Werner.

=== Rudnicki family ===
Mariusz Rudnicki (Mateusz Łasowski) is a husband of Monika and has two daughters. In April 2022 he beat his wife Monika and she was hospitalized with her injuries.

Monika Rudnicka (Joanna Niemirska) is a wife of Mariusz Rudnicki. She has two daughters, Amelia and Hanna. In April 2022 she was beaten by her husband, injured and hospitalized. Marcin Chodakowski and his wife Izabela took care of Monika's daughters. Monika was later in a psychiatric hospital because she suffered from panic attacks and PTSD. In September 2022 she completed her treatment and started working at Kinga Zduńska's bar.

Amelia Rudnicka (Ninel Kos) is a daughter of Mariusz Rudnicki and his wife, Monika Rudnicka. In 2022, Izabela Chodakowska and Marcin Chodakowski took care of her after her mother was beaten by Mariusz Rudnicki and hospitalized.

Hanna Rudnicka (Marta Stefaniak) is a daughter of Mariusz Rudnicki and his wife, Monika Rudnicka. In 2022, Izabela Chodakowska and Marcin Chodakowski took care of her after her mother was beaten by Mariusz Rudnicki and hospitalized.

=== Stawski family ===
Katarzyna Karska, born Stawska (Paulina Lasota) is a doctor from Warsaw. She is married to Jakub Karski since 2023. In 2025 Katarzyna betrayed her husband, with whom she is expecting child, with her former boyfriend, Mariusz.

Jakub Karski (Krzysztof Kwiatkowski) is a detective from Warsaw. He is married to Katarzyna Stawska since 2023.

Justyna Stawska is a sister of Katarzyna Stawska.

Milena Stawska (Ewa Kania) was an aunt of Katarzyna Stawska and Justyna Stawska. She was in a relationship with Jan. At the age of 17, she gave birth to a son, Adam Olszyna, whom she gave for adoption.

Adam Olszyna, born Stawski (Michał Wojciula) is a son of Milena Stawska and her then lover. His mother gave him to adoption and he was adopted by Mr and Mrs. Olszyna. He is not aware that he was adopted. In April 2024 he met his cousins, Katarzyna and Justyna. He workes as a doctor in Warsaw.

=== Tatiszwili family ===
Otar Tatiszwili (David Gamtsemlidze) is a senior of Tatiszwili family. He is Georgian. Otar lives in Warsaw and owns a restaurant.

Katia Tatiszwili, primo voto Zduńska (Joanna Jarmołowicz) is a daughter of Otar Tatiszwili and his wife. On 21 May 2018 she married Paweł Zduński in order to have a Polish citizenship. They eventually fell in love with each other but divorced on 20 November 2018. Katia had a romance with Łukasz Wojciechowski and fell pregnant. Her father didn't accept that she was expecting a child out of wedlock. On 9 March 2020, she gave birth to her daughter, Natalia Wojciechowska.

=== Zarzycki family ===
Franciszek Zarzycki was a senior of Zarzycki family. He was known by Barbara Mostowiak and was a forester.

Tomasz Zarzycki was a grandson of Franciszek Zarzycki. He was married to Teresa Zarzycka and had one son.

Teresa Zarzycka was a wife of Tomasz Zarzycki.

Franciszek Zarzycki is a son of Tomasz Zarzycki and his wife, Teresa Zarzycka. His fiancee, Justyna Górska, left him on their wedding day. On 5 October 2015 in a forest near Grabina he helped Natalia Mostowiak deliver her daughter Hanna. Franciszek started dating Natalia. They got engaged on 4 September 2017 and married on 27 November 2017 in Lipnica. Zarzycki adopted Hanna and changed her surname to Zarzycki. Marriage of Natalia and Franciszek ended after he reconciled with Justyna Górska and betrayed his wife on 11 February 2019.

== Minor characters ==
- Konrad Badecki (Rafał Królikowski) was a teacher at one of universities in Warsaw and landscape architect. He was married to Justyna Badecka (Dorota Sadowska). In 2001 he started romance with Małgorzata Mostowiak. Małgorzata learnt that he was married in April 2002 and left him. She was then blackmailed by him and his wife. Badecki wanted to expel her from university, but she was defended by her boyfriend, Michał Łagoda. Later, Małgorzata discovered that Justyna also had an extramarital romance but was blackmailed by her and didn't tell anyone. Justyna Badecka employed Małgorzata in her company in September 2004.
- Irena Gałązka (Joanna Kasperska) is a former adoptive mother of Hanna Walisiak. She and her husband adopted Hanna, whose parents died in a car accident but they took her back to the orphanage in Józefowo when Irena fell pregnant. Irena's child later died and she had a mental disorder ever since. She met her former daughter again in 2001 when Hanna was separated from her husband Marek Mostowiak and expecting their child. Hanna escaped from Irena house but Irena found her at hospital. She had a nervous breakdown and it was revealed that she was being treated psychiatrically. In November 2002 Irena kidnapped Hanna's son, Mateusz Mostowiak and wanted to kill him and herself. Mateusz was saved by his parents and Irena was arrested.
- Tadeusz Gałązka (Sławomir Orzechowski) was a husband of Irena Gałązka and former adoptive father of Hanna Walisiak.
- Waldemar Jaroszy (Maciej Kozłowski) was a famous producer of mineral water. He was raised in an orphanage. In December 2002 he came to Gródek to meet Maria Zduńska, who was producing another mineral water, Dar Grabiny. While visiting Maria's plant Waldemar met Hanna Mostowiak and was interested in her. Jaroszy had a bigger firm that Maria and his actions led to Maria losing her water plant in September 2003. Jaroszy decided to close the plant, leaving Kozielski without work, but after a talk with Hanna Mostowiak in December 2003 he reopened it and hired former employees. In December 2003 he saved life of Lucjan Mostowiak who was hit by a car. In January 2004 Jaroszy offered Hanna running a foundation Serce dziecka to help children from orphanages.
- Marian Kalisiak (Paweł Nowisz) worked in a processing plant in Lipnica, owned by Zenon Łagoda. In 2001, he tried to seduce Hanna Walisiak. Krzysztof Zduński, a new owner of a plant, discovered that Kalisiak stole firm money. Maria revealed to Maria Zduńska that he needed money to treat his terminally ill daughter.
- Jolanta Kowalska (Anita Jancia) was a best friend of Hanna Walisiak and a witness at her 2001 civil wedding to Marek Mostowiak. Jolanta was raised in an orphanage in Józefowo. In March 2003 she got engaged to Stefan Miller, a German who moved in Grabina. In May 2003 after many years she met Andrzej (Mariusz Zaniewski), her former boyfriend. Jolanta renewed their romance and was betraying Stefan. In June 2003 Jolanta broke off her engagement and reconciled with Andrzej. In December 2003 Jolanta, dumped by Andrzej, came to Stefan to Grabina, apologized him for escaping from a church on their wedding day and admitted that it was a mistake. Jolanta worked in a bank and help Hanna discover that Waldemar Jaroszy was making financial frauds in Hanna's foundation.
- Tomasz Kozielski (Edward Żentara) was a business partner of Krzysztof Zduński. Maria, Krzysztof's wife, was opposed to their partnership. In 2001 Tomasz discovered that Krzysztof's plant's workers steal money from a firm. Tomasz was married to Renata Kozielska, but in 2002 he had a brief affair with Maria Zduńska. In October 2002 Renata sold a company she owned, leaving Krzysztof Zduński without work. In September 2003 he took over a water plant in Lipnica, owned by Maria Zduńska. He lost his work after Waldemar Jaroszy decided to close a plant.
- Rafał Lubomirski (Jacek Poniedziałek) worked as an administrative worker in a court in Warsaw. In early 2004 he met Marta Mostowiak and they became friends. Rafał and Marta had a close contact after the breakdown of her marriage to Jacek Milecki. Lubomirski had a son born from his previous relationship.
- Zbigniew Napiórkowski (Waldemar Kownacki) was a writer who was a first guest at agrotourism farm owned by Małgorzata Łagoda in October 2003. He and Małgorzata started a romance, while her husband was living in the United States. In December 2003 Napiórkowski published a book in which he detailed his romance with Małgorzata.
- Marcin Polański-Van Burgen (Paweł Małaszyński) was raised in an orphanage in Józefowo. In September 2003, after a meeting of orphanage's former residents, he met his first girlfriend, Hanna Walisiak, who was married to Marek Mostowiak. Their strong feelings towards each other led to Hanna leaving her husband and son to spend time with Marcin in a hide. Marcin was diagnosed with a last stage of leukaemia and Hanna stayed with him. Marcin died on 20 October 2003, leaving Hanna's heartbroken.
- Jan Rogowski was a boyfriend of Hanna Walisiak. They were friends when Hanna was married to Marek Mostowiak. Jan warned pregnant Hanna that Irena Gałązka was unpredictable. He was arrested when he came into Gałązka's house. He was later defended by Jacek Milecki.
- Anna Waszkiewicz (Weronika Rosati) is a classmate of Piotr Zduński, Paweł Zduński and Kinga Filarska from secondary school in Gródek. In the past, she was in relationships with Paweł Zduński and Andrzej Budzyński. In May 2003 she was a witness at secret civil wedding of Kinga Filarska and Piotr Zduński. Then she was in a relationship with Paweł Zduński but was heartbroken when in late 2003 she discovered that Paweł was still in love with his distant cousin, Teresa Makowska. Anna passed a matura exam but didn't get accepted in college.
- Katarzyna Wójcik-Kociołek, born Kociołek (Ewelina Serafin) was born in 1978. She was engaged to marry her classmate, Marek Mostowiak. In 2001 he broke their engagement off after developing a romance with Hanna Walisiak. Since May 2002 Katarzyna was in a relationship with Sebastian Kociołek. In September 2002 she went to the wedding of Marek Mostowiak and Hanna Mostowiak and announced that she was pregnant with Marek's child. Katarzyna miscarried her child and it was revealed that it was Sebastian's child. Katarzyna married Sebastian Kociołek in December 2003.

== List of main characters' departures ==
Date	Character (actor)	Storyline	Reason
6 December 2021	Joanna Chodakowska; Barbara Kurdej-Szatan	Joanna moved to France with her fiancé, Leszek	
30 November 2021	Marzena Lisiecka; Olga Szomańska	Marzena died in a car accident with her husband	
30 November 2021	Andrzej Lisiecki; Tomasz Oświeciński	Tomasz died in a car accident with his wife	
21 April 2021	Natalia Zarzycka; Marcjanna Lelek	Natalia moved to Australia with her daughter after her husband's affair	
9 April 2020	Urszula Lisiecka; Iga Krefft	Urszula moved to Australia with her husband; she came back on 22 December 2020	
26 November 2018	Marek Mostowiak; Kacper Kuszewski	Marek moved to Australia with his wife	
11 September 2017	Tomasz Chodakowski; Andrzej Młynarski	Tomasz died after being hit with a knife in Warsaw	
5 September 2017	Lucjan Mostowiak; Witold Pyrkosz	Lucjan died after a long illness	
9 March 2015	Katarzyna Mularczyk; Agnieszka Sienkiewicz	Katarzyna died due to complications from childbirth	
1 October 2013	Małgorzata Chodakowska; Joanna Koroniewska	Małgorzata moved to United States to live with her former husband, Michał Łagoda	
7 November 2011	Hanna Mostowiak; Małgorzata Kożuchowska	Hanna died after an aneurysm broke in her brain	
8 May 2007	Norbert Wojciechowski; Mariusz Sabiniewicz	Norbert died in a plane crash	
6 March 2006	Krzysztof Zduński; Cezary Morawski	Krzysztof died after suffering a heart attack	
