= Fibiger =

Fibiger is a surname. Notable people with the surname include:

- Arnold Fibiger (1847–1915), Polish piano builder
- Elfride Fibiger (1832–1911), Danish writer
- Ilia Fibiger (1817–1867), Danish writer
- Jesse Fibiger (born 1978), Canadian hockey player
- Johannes Fibiger (1867–1928), Danish pathologist
- Mathilde Fibiger (1830–1872), Danish writer

== Other ==
- Fibiger (crater), lunar crater
