= Tyszko =

Tyszko (alternatively Tyshko) is a surname. Notable people with the surname include:

- Grażyna Tyszko (born 1949), Polish politician
- Ian Tyszko, pseudonym of Leo Jogiches (1867–1919), Polish revolutionary
- Stefan Tyszko (died 1969), British photographer
- Mykhailo Tyshko (born 1959), Soviet fencer
