= 1980 in Poland =

- Decades: 1960s; 1970s; 1980s; 1990s; 2000s
- See also: Other events of 1980; Timeline of Polish history

== Incumbents ==
On March 27, 1976, the government of Prime Minister Piotr Jaroszewicz was created. It lasted until April 2, 1980. Jaroszewicz himself was removed from his post on February 18, 1980, and was replaced by Edward Babiuch. Babiuch was dismissed on April 2, 1980. His resignation was accepted by the Sejm on the same day, and the next day, April 3, a new government was created, with Babiuch again as Prime Minister. On September 5, 1980, Józef Pińkowski was named new Prime Minister, and held the post until February 11, 1981.

Edward Gierek, who had been the First Secretary of the Polish Communist Party since December 20, 1970, was dismissed on September 6, and was replaced by Stanislaw Kania.

=== Members of the government ===
- Prime Ministers of Poland - Piotr Jaroszewicz, Edward Babiuch, Jozef Pinkowski
- First Secretaries of the Communist Party - Edward Gierek, Stanislaw Kania
- Minister of National Defence - Wojciech Jaruzelski
- For members of the Polish Politburo, see Politburo of the Polish United Workers' Party

=== Other personalities ===
- Roman Catholic Primate of Poland - Stefan Wyszyński
- President of Polish government-in-exile - Edward Raczynski
- Prime Minister of Polish government-in-exile - Kazimierz Sabbat

== Events ==
=== January ===
- January 1, Polkowice-Sieroszowice mine is opened,
- January 16. Premiere of Janusz Morgenstern's film Godzina W,
- January 19. Cricot 2 theatre company's branch is opened in Kraków on Kanonicza Street,

=== February ===
- February 9. Announcement of the Central Statistical Office. Average monthly salary in Poland is 5,087 zlotys,
- February 15. VIII Congress of the Polish United Workers' Party ends. Edward Gierek is re-elected First Secretary,
- February 18. Prime Minister Piotr Jaroszewicz is replaced by Edward Babiuch,
- February 18. Premiere of Feliks Falk's film Szansa,

=== March ===
- March 14. Crash of LOT Flight 7. Among the dead is singer Anna Jantar,
- March 21. Retired bakery worker and Home Army soldier Walenty Badylak immoculates himself on Kraków's Main Market Square, protesting against propaganda lies about Katyn massacre,
- March 23. Local and general elections. According to official reports, 98,8% Poles vote. According to the estimates of the oppositional Workers' Defence Committee, the turnout is at 75-85%. More than 99% vote for the list of the Front of National Unity; no other list exists,
- March 24. Premiere of Andrzej Wajda's film The Orchestra Conductor,
- March 24. Premiere of Kazimierz Kutz's film Paciorki jednego różańca,
- March 25. Mirosław Chojecki of independent printing office NOWA is arrested,

=== April ===
- April 3. First meeting of the VIII Sejm takes place in Warsaw. Henryk Jabłoński is elected chairman of the Council of State, Edward Babiuch is Prime Minister, and Stanisław Gucwa is the speaker of the Sejm,
- April 6. Telewizja Polska presents first episode of The Career of Nicodemus Dyzma, a miniseries, based on a book by Tadeusz Dołęga-Mostowicz,
- April 21. Seven coal miners die in a catastrophe at Barbara Coal Mine in Chorzów,

=== May ===
- May 7. Polish Episcopal Conference warns about "Uncomfortable, negative phenomena in social, cultural, economic and political life of Poland", urging the government to introduce necessary reforms,
- May 20. Henryk Jaskuła returns to the port of Gdynia, after a 344-day single-handed non-stop circumnavigation of the globe,

=== June ===
- June 6. Jarocin Festival begins
- June 12. Trial of opposition activists Mieczysław Chojecki and Stanisław Grzesiak begins. They are accused of stealing a duplicating machine and sentenced to 1,5 years behind bars,
- June 28. Roman - Catholic bishops, gathered at a Polish Episcopal Conference at Saint Anne Mountain near Opole, emphasize "growing difficulties in the social life of the nation",

=== July ===
- July 1. A wave of industrial actions sweeps across Poland. Altogether, on that day workers in some 200 enterprises lay down their tools, protesting against increase of the price of meat and meat products. Among protesting factories, there are such leading enterprises of the nation, as PZL Mielec, Ursus Factory in Warsaw, Autosan in Sanok, Factory of Specialized Machine Tools Ponar in Tarnów, truck drivers servicing construction of the Połaniec Power Station. Meeting of the Polish Politburo takes place in Warsaw, but the protests are not discussed,
- July 2. Industrial action spreads to other locations. Strikes begin, among others, at Automobile Spare Parts Factory Polmo in Tczew, Warsaw Steel Mill in Warsaw, Machine Factory Pomet in Poznań, Rzeszów Building Company in Dąbrowa Górnicza. At Jacek Kuroń's Warsaw apartment, a temporary news center is opened, which informs Western mass-media about protests. Workers demand pay rises and changes in norms, and Workers' Defense Committee urges workers to act in a responsible way, and to support each other,
- July 3. Further enterprises join the protests - Monochrome Tube Plant in Piaseczno, Machine Tools Repair Shop Ponar – Reso in Żyrardów, state liquor monopoly Polmos in Poznań, Leather Factory Syrena in Warsaw. At the Ursus plant, a Workers Committee is created, which demands guarantee of immunity for protesting workers,
- July 4. Strike at Tarnów Company of General Construction in Tarnów,
- July 8. First strikes in the area of Lublin - the beginning of the Lublin 1980 strikes. In the following days, protests spread to the whole province, including rail workers, city transit, Lublin Truck Factory, PZL-Świdnik (where the local industrial action began), and other enterprises. Strikes at FSO Warszawa, Meat Plant in Grudziądz, Instal in Kalisz. Official mass-media do not inform about the protests, the nation gets the information from Radio Free Europe, which for the first time informed about the situation in Lublin on July 9,
- July 9. Meeting of Party leaders and activists in Warsaw. Edward Gierek calms those present, telling that the difficulties are temporary. Strikes spread across the country. Among enterprises taking part in them, there are Rosa Luxemburg Lamp Factory in Warsaw, Światowit in Myszków, Apator in Toruń, Stella in Żyrardów, Polfa Pharmaceuticals in Warsaw, Dolmel Lower Silesia Electric Machines Manufacturing Corporation in Wrocław, H. Cegielski - Poznań, Port of Gdynia, Huta Stalowa Wola in Stalowa Wola, Polmo in Świdnica, RSW Prasa-Książka-Ruch in Warsaw,
- July 10. Meeting of the Politburo, industrial actions are discussed,
- July 18. Appeal to the Residents of Lublin is published in local mass-media,
- July 20. Protesting workers in Lublin come to agreement with government negotiators, headed by Mieczysław Jagielski. The government promises pay rises,
- July 22. For the first time in the history of the People's Republic of Poland, no major celebrations of the PKWN Manifesto are organized,
- July 24. Top members of Polish Politburo, including Edward Gierek, leave for vacation at Crimea. Ostrów Wielkopolski is paralysed by a strike,
- July 30. At 1980 Summer Olympics in Moscow, Władysław Kozakiewicz makes an obscene gesture to the hostile Soviet crowd,
- July 31. In Crimea, Edward Gierek meets Leonid Brezhnev.

=== August ===
- August 14. A strike begins at the Gdańsk Shipyard. In the following days, shipyard workers are joined by other enterprises, including mass transit and the Port of Gdańsk,
- August 15. Interfactory Strike Committee (MKS), headed by Lech Wałęsa, is founded in Gdańsk. Stocznia Gdynia joins the protest, as well as local mass transit system,
- August 16. Polish Ministry of Internal Affairs crates staff for Operation Summer-80,
- August 17. Gdańsk workers draw a list of 21 demands (see 21 demands of MKS),
- August 18. Strike at Adolf Warski Szczecin Shipyard, where workers create their own Interfactory Strike Committee, headed by Marian Jurczyk, and create their list of 36 demands,
- August 19. Otłoczyn railway accident, 67 people die,
- August 21. A delegation of the government, with Mieczysław Jagielski, comes to the Gdańsk Shipyard,
- August 23. General strike action in the Tricity. First issue of Strike Information Bulletin "Solidarność" is published,
- August 24. Committee of Experts, headed by Tadeusz Mazowiecki, is created by the Gdańsk Interfactory Strike Committee. Changes in the Polish Politburo, Edward Babiuch is sidelined, and replaced by new Prime Minister, Józef Pińkowski,
- August 25. Soviet Politburo creates the so-called Suslov Commission, to follow the crisis in Poland,
- August 26. At the Jasna Góra Monastery, Primate Stefan Wyszyński urges workers to end their protests, but his calls are not obeyed. Wave of strikes sweeps across the nation,
- August 27. Polish government requests more U.S. grain credits. Soviet ambassador to Warsaw, Boris Aristov, meets Edward Gierek and suggests that the opposition movement should be crushed,
- August 28. Industrial action begins in Manifest Lipcowy Coal Mine in Jastrzębie-Zdrój. In the following days, most enterprises from the city, and other locations in Upper Silesia, join the protests (see Jastrzębie-Zdrój 1980 strikes),
- August 30. Signing of the Szczecin Agreement,
- August 31. Signing of the Gdańsk Agreement.

=== September ===
- September 1. Supreme Administrative Court of Poland officially begins its activity. Polish press publishes contents of the Gdańsk and Szczecin Agreements. Eight miners die in a disaster at Halemba Coal Mine. Most workers return to work, protests are continued in coal mines in Upper Silesia and Zagłębie Dąbrowskie,
- September 2. Warsaw Old Town is added to the UNESCO World Heritage Site list. Negotiations with striking workers and miners begin in Jastrzębie-Zdrój, at Manifest Lipcowy Coal Mine. Local Interfactory Strike Committee represents 56 enterprises, including 28 coal mines. In Gdańsk, a Temporary Founding Committee of Independent Students' Union is created,
- September 3. Jastrzębie Agreement is signed at Manifest Lipcowy Coal Mine, at 5:45 in the morning. Most coal miners in Upper Silesia return to work,
- September 4. Protesting miners in Bytom create their own Interfactory Strike Committee. Mass strike actions begin in Tarnobrzeg, Mielec, Płock, Siedlce, Tarnów, Piotrków Trybunalski and Białystok. In Warsaw, leaders of trades unions create their own Temporary Council of Solidarity Mazovia. Edward Gierek is taken to hospital with suspected heart attack,
- September 6. Stanisław Kania becomes First Secretary of the Communist Party, replacing Edward Gierek. According to Polish secret services, in August 1980, 700,000 workers took part in industrial actions,
- September 7. Deputy Prime Minister Henryk Kisiel reveals that Polish foreign debt is 20 billion dollars. Industrial actions in several locations,
- September 10. Solidarity's Interfactory Founding Committee is created in Lublin,
- September 11. Interfactory Founding Committees are created in Poznań and Bielsko-Biała. According to the government, industrial actions are continued in 40 enterprises. An agreement between protesting workers and the government is signed in Katowice Steelworks in Dąbrowa Górnicza,
- September 12. Interfactory Founding Committee is created in Białystok,
- September 13. Polish Council of State announces that newly created trade unions must be registered at Warsaw's Provincial Court on condition that their statutes comply with Constitution of the People's Republic of Poland,
- September 15. According to Solidarity sources, the union, which was created only a few weeks earlier, already has 16 regional offices, and 3 million members in 3500 enterprises. Interfactory Founding Committee is created in Kraków, and in Vladimir Lenin Steelworks in Nowa Huta, 90% of the workforce are Solidarity members. Another Founding Committee is created in Zielona Góra,
- September 16. The government of Poland and Polish Episcopal Conference declare agreement on Polish Radio's broadcasts of Sunday services, which was one of demands of protesting workers. First service to be broadcast was scheduled for Sunday, September 21, from Holy Cross Church, Warsaw,
- September 17. Local leaders of independent trades unions meet in Gdańsk, and create Independent Self-governing Labour Union "Solidarity. Interfactory Founding Committee is created in Jelenia Góra,
- September 21. For the first time since 1939, Polish Radio broadcasts live a Roman Catholic Sunday service,
- September 22. Meeting of Solidarity's National Coordinating Commission in Gdańsk, where statutes are discussed, as well as future regional structure of the union. In Warsaw, at student dormitory Mikrus, first meeting of Temporary Founding Committees of Independent Students' Union takes place,
- September 24. Solidarity leaders come to Warsaw's court, to hand over a request for registration of their union. They are guaranteed that all paperwork will be handled in no longer than two weeks,
- September 25. Arrest of Leszek Moczulski, who is accused of attacking the state in an interview given to Der Spiegel,
- September 27. Bogdan Borusewicz becomes a member of Solidarity Bureau,
- September 29. Solidarity issues a statement, in which it criticizes slow implementation of the Gdańsk Agreement. One hour national warning strike is announced for Friday, October 3, between midday and 1 p.m. Interfactory Founding Committee is created in Kalisz. Secret services agents search the apartment of Zbigniew Romaszewski.

=== October ===
- October 1. In Gdańsk, deputy Prime Minister Mieczysław Jagielski meets Solidarity leaders. Justice Zdzislaw Kościelniak of the Warsaw Provincial Court demands several changes to the draft of Solidarity statutes,
- October 2. International Chopin Piano Competition begins in Warsaw,
- October 3. All across the nation, one-hour warning strikes take place in selected enterprises, as a protest against government's slow implementation of the Gdańsk Agreement. The strike lasts from midday to 1 p.m., and in some locations, such as Gdańsk, Wrocław, Elbląg, Bydgoszcz, Bytom and Wałbrzych, almost all enterprises participate in it. In other places, protests are organized in selected enterprises, including schools and theatres,
- October 4–5. Meeting of the Polish Politburo, during which a report on the scale of protests is presented. In the period July - September 1980, strikes took place in 2,000 enterprises, with 1,2 million workers participating. Several officials are removed from the Politburo,
- October 5. Moscow informs about closing of the Polish-Soviet border crossing at Brest,
- October 6. Meeting of Solidarity leaders in Gdańsk. In a letter sent to the government, they demand access to the mass-media,
- October 7. Colonel Tadeusz Malicki of Committee of Defence of the Country draws a "Note on Martial Law", and is ordered to prepare a more detailed document,
- October 9. Czesław Miłosz wins Nobel Prize in Literature,
- October 10. Henryk Samsonowicz is appointed a new rector of the University of Warsaw. Stanisław Kania meets local Solidarity activists in Szczecin,
- October 11. Local Solidarity offices are opened in Białystok and Nowy Targ,
- October 14. Around 1,000 students of Gdańsk University come to a meeting with Jacek Kuroń,
- October 15. Ministry of the Interior and Administration orders local police departments to prepare lists of Solidarity activists for future arrest,
- October 16. 176. Conference of Polish Episcopate ends. In Warsaw, Solidarity legal advisers meet judges of the Provincial Court,
- October 17. Negotiations between protesting health care workers and the government take place in Gdańsk. In Wrocław, talks between railroad workers and the government begin. The talks are broken several times, and on October 21, 34 members of railroad Solidarity begin a hunger strike,
- October 18. At Warsaw University of Technology, a meeting of activists of Independent Students' Union (NZS) begins. National Founding Committee of the NZS is created, with such members, as Piotr Bikont, Maciej Kuroń and Agnieszka Romaszewska. On the same day, a three-day trip of Lech Wałęsa, Andrzej Gwiazda, Anna Walentynowicz and other Solidarity leaders begins. They visit several location in Southern Poland, 12,000 come to a rally at a football stadium in Nowa Huta, during which Wałęsa makes a speech. Solidarity leaders also visit other locations in Lesser Poland, such as Nowy Targ, Nowy Sącz, Tarnów, Częstochowa, as well as Jastrzębie-Zdrój,
- October 20. Activists of Independent Students' Union come to the Warsaw Provincial Court with documentation required for registration,
- October 21. Stanislaw Kania talks with Primate Stefan Wyszyński. In Poznan, Social Committee for Construction of Monument of Poznań 1956 protests is created,
- October 22. Wojciech Jaruzelski orders Polish General Staff to update their plans for a nationwide martial law,
- October 23. Industrial action in Ursus Factory in Warsaw. According to Solidarity estimates, the newly created union has 6 - 8 million members,
- October 24. Agreement is signed between striking workers and the government commission in Katowice Steelworks. Warsaw Provincial Court delays registration of Solidarity, claiming that in the statutes there is no mention of the leading role of the Party and a promise not to change Poland's alliances. In response, Solidarity threatens with a general strike. Hunger strike of eight rail workers in Bydgoszcz. They demand talks with the government, and general strike of Polish rail is planned for October 27,
- October 25. Solidarity's National Coordinating Commission of Radio and TV Workers is created in Wrocław,
- October 27. National Coordinating Commission of Solidarity convenes in Gdańsk. In an announcement, the Commission states that the decision of the court in Warsaw is "unlawful", and caused further tension among Polish workers,
- October 29. Provincial Court in Warsaw refuses to register the Rural Solidarity, claiming that individual farmers are not entitled to create their own trade union. Soviet Politburo, at a meeting in Moscow, discusses the situation in Poland. Leonid Brezhnev says that there is "counter-revolution", and that martial law will be necessary. Andrey Gromyko declares: "We simply cannot and must not lose Poland",
- October 30. Stanisław Kania and Józef Pińkowski visit Moscow, where they meet Brezhnev,
- October 31. Negotiations between the government and Solidarity leaders begin in Warsaw. The government allows Solidarity to publish its own national weekly, Tygodnik Solidarność.

=== November ===
- November 1. Polityka weekly publishes interviews with Solidarity leaders Lech Wałęsa, Andrzej Gwiazda, Alina Pieńkowska, Bogdan Lis and Bogdan Borusewicz. Wałęsa declares: "We do not question socialism and our alliances, we respect the reality, which is inevitable. We will not return to Capitalism, we will not copy any Western system. Socialism is not a bad system, and let it be, but in a controlled way",
- November 2. Lech Wałęsa participates in a rally in Włocławek,
- November 3. General Boguslaw Stachura of the Ministry of the Interior and Administration begins preparations for Operation Malwa - blockade of telephone and communications lines for the needs of the future martial law,
- November 6. Postal workers start protest in Poznań,
- November 7. In Gdańsk, negotiations between health care workers and government fail. In several cities, mass transit stops for one hour, in solidarity with health care workers,
- November 8. Government expert Antoni Rajkiewicz states that 6,2 million Poles live below poverty threshold. Food rations in hospitals, kindergartens and schools were cut down, as well as government's financial support of the poor. In 1979, only 36 kilograms of meat were eaten by an average Pole, while alcohol consumption rose. Stanisław Kania tells the Politburo that martial law will be prepared,
- November 10. Supreme Court of Poland voids changes to the Solidarity statutes, made by the Warsaw Provincial Court. Solidarity leaders agree to make additional changes, recognizing leading role of the Communist Party in the nation. Therefore, Solidarity is officially registered,
- November 11. In Warsaw, Gdańsk and other cities, crowds celebrate Polish Independence Day, which is officially banned by the government. On the same day, mass protests begin in Częstochowa, where Solidarity activists demand removal of local government and Party leaders, including First Secretary Józef Grygiel,
- November 12. Wojciech Jaruzelski informs members of the Homeland Security Committee that plans for the martial law are not ready yet,
- November 13. Provincial Court in Warsaw refuses to register Independent Students' Union,
- November 14. First meeting of Lech Wałęsa and Stanisław Kania,
- November 19. Lignite excavation begins at Bełchatów Coal Mine,
- November 20. In East Berlin, Stefan Olszowski of the Polish Politburo, in a conversation with Erich Honecker, says: "Confrontation is inevitable, it will take place sooner or later. We will have to use political and administrative means. By administrative means, I mean arrests. We have trained 30,000 people to fight on the streets". In a Solidarity office in Warsaw, secret service and police officers discover a secret government document on the methods of prosecution of anti-socialist activity. On the next day, two Solidarity activists are arrested and accused of theft of the document - Jan Narożniak and Piotr Sapello, which sparks furious protests of the opposition (the so-called Narożniak Affair),
- November 21. Jerzy Ozdowski of the Polish Catholic-Social Union (PZKS) is appointed deputy Prime Minister,
- November 24. Industrial action in Warsaw, in protest of Jan Narożniak's arrest. Several factories go on strike, including Ursus,
- November 26. Solidarity leaders from Warsaw announce general strike and urge other regions to join the action. Strikes begin in Radom, Kielce, Kraków, Wroclaw, Łódź and Gdańsk. At night, Jan Narożniak is released from prison, and all strikes are cancelled. Erich Honecker sends a letter to Leonid Brezhnev, calling for an emergency meeting of Warsaw Pact leaders to "work out how to help Polish friends in the crisis",
- November 27. Pravda calls for "urgent measures" to restore the leading role of the Party in Poland,
- November 28. NATO warns that Soviet intervention in Poland will prompt serious sanctions against the Soviet Union,

=== December ===
- December 1. In Moscow, Soviet authorities hand to General Tadeusz Hupałowski and Colonel Zygmunt Puchała plans of Soviet troops entry into Poland, designed as part of the Soyuz '80 maneuvers. The Soviets are ready to enter Poland on December 8,
- December 2. Edward Gierek is removed from the Central Committee of the Party, and blamed for economic and social crisis of Poland,
- December 3. Marshal Viktor Kulikov, commander in chief of the Warsaw Pact, officially requests permission of General Wojciech Jaruzelski to begin the Soyuz '80 maneuvers on December 8. President Jimmy Carter, in a dispatch sent to Moscow, warns that Soviet invasion of Poland would negatively affect Soviet - American relations,
- December 4. Polish press publishes Communist Party's appeal to the nation,
- December 5. In Moscow, a meeting of leaders of Communist countries takes place, called upon request of Erich Honecker, who was concerned about the situation in Poland. In Warsaw, General Tadeusz Tuczapski, secretary of the Committee of Defence of the Country, approves schedule of a plan for martial law (see: Martial Law in Poland). Works on the plan are to be completed by December 31, 1981. In Warsaw, peasant activists begin working on statutes of the Rural Solidarity,
- December 9. President Jimmy Carter announces that according to American intelligence, the Soviets completed their preparations for an intervention in Poland. On the same day, Karlino oil eruption,
- December 10. Beginning of the Soyuz '80 maneuvers, under supervision of Marshal Kulikov, whose headquarters is located in Legnica,
- December 12. Aleksander Gieysztor is elected president of the Polish Academy of Sciences,
- December 14. Top Rural Solidarity activists meet in Warsaw,
- December 16. Celebration of the anniversary of Polish 1970 protests in Gdańsk, during which a monument dedicated to victims is unveiled,
- December 17. A monument dedicated to victims of the 1970 protests is unveiled in Gdynia,
- December 19. A group of high-ranking Communist officials (Edward Gierek, Piotr Jaroszewicz, Jerzy Łukaszewicz, Jan Szydlak) resign as deputies of the Sejm,
- December 23. Minister of Labour announces that in 1981, there will be two work-free Saturdays each month,
- December 28–30. Council of Association of Polish Writers convenes in Warsaw, electing Józef Szczepański as president,
- December 29. First day of individual peasants' protest in Ustrzyki Dolne. Farmers occupy office of local government, demanding, among others, registration of Rural Solidarity. The action is supported by the Solidarity,
