= Stolarczyk =

Stolarczyk is a Polish surname, meaning a "little carpenter". Archaic feminine forms are Stolarczykowa (by husband), Stolarczykówna (by father); they still can be used colloquially. Notable people include:

- Beth Stolarczyk
- Jakub Stolarczyk, Polish football goalkeeper
- John Stolarczyk, Curator of the World Carrot Museum
- Maciej Stolarczyk, Polish football player and manager
- Stanisław Stolarczyk, Polish journalist and writer
