= 1847 in Poland =

- Decades: 1820s; 1830s; 1840s; 1850s; 1860s
- See also: Other events of 1847; Timeline of Polish history

Events from the year 1847 in Poland

== Births ==
- September 12 – Wacław Mayzel, histologist (d. 1916)
- October 16 – Arnold Fibiger, piano builder and industrialist (d. 1915)
- Emil Godlewski, botanist (d. 1930)

== Deaths ==
- March 10 – Nepomucena Kostecka, stage actress (b. 1807)
- July 28 – Jan Nepomucen Głowacki, realist painter (b. 1802)
- Kajetan Garbiński, mathematician (b. 1796)
