= 1949 in Poland =

- Decades: 1920s; 1930s; 1940s; 1950s; 1960s
- See also: Other events of 1949; Timeline of Polish history

The following lists events that happened during 1949 in Poland.

== Incumbents ==
=== Members of the government ===
- President - Bolesław Bierut
- Prime Minister - Józef Cyrankiewicz

== Events ==
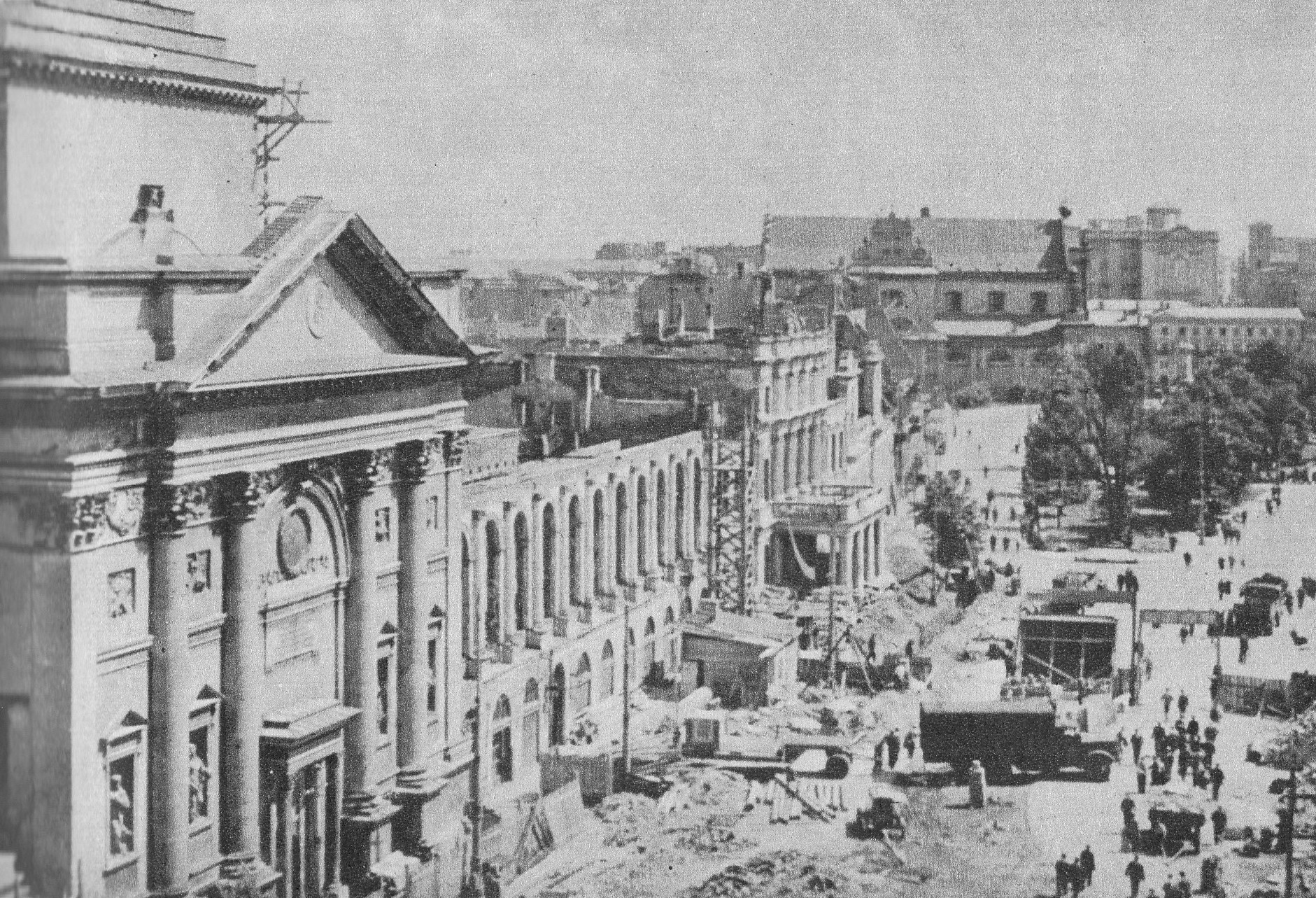
Post-WWII reconstruction of Warsaw, 1949

- 2 September - The Society of Fighters for Freedom and Democracy is established.
- The Three-Year Plan ends.

== Births ==
- 15 April – Aleksandra Ziółkowska-Boehm, writer
- 25 April – Grażyna Tyszko, politician
- 4 May – Stanisław Stolarczyk, journalist, reporter, writer
- 18 June
  - Jarosław Kaczyński, Prime Minister of Poland
  - Lech Kaczyński, Prime Minister of Poland (died 2010)
- 3 October 1949 – Svika Pick, Israeli pop singer, songwriter, composer, and television personality (died 2022)

== Deaths ==
- 5 June - Emilia Malessa, Freedom and Independence member, committed suicide in prison (born 1907)
- 24 July - Konstanty Skirmunt, Minister of Foreign Affairs 1921-1922 (born 1866)
- 27 December - Antoni Ponikowski, politician (born 1878)
