= Katowice Steelworks =

Architectural structure

Coordinates: 50.344°N 19.280°E

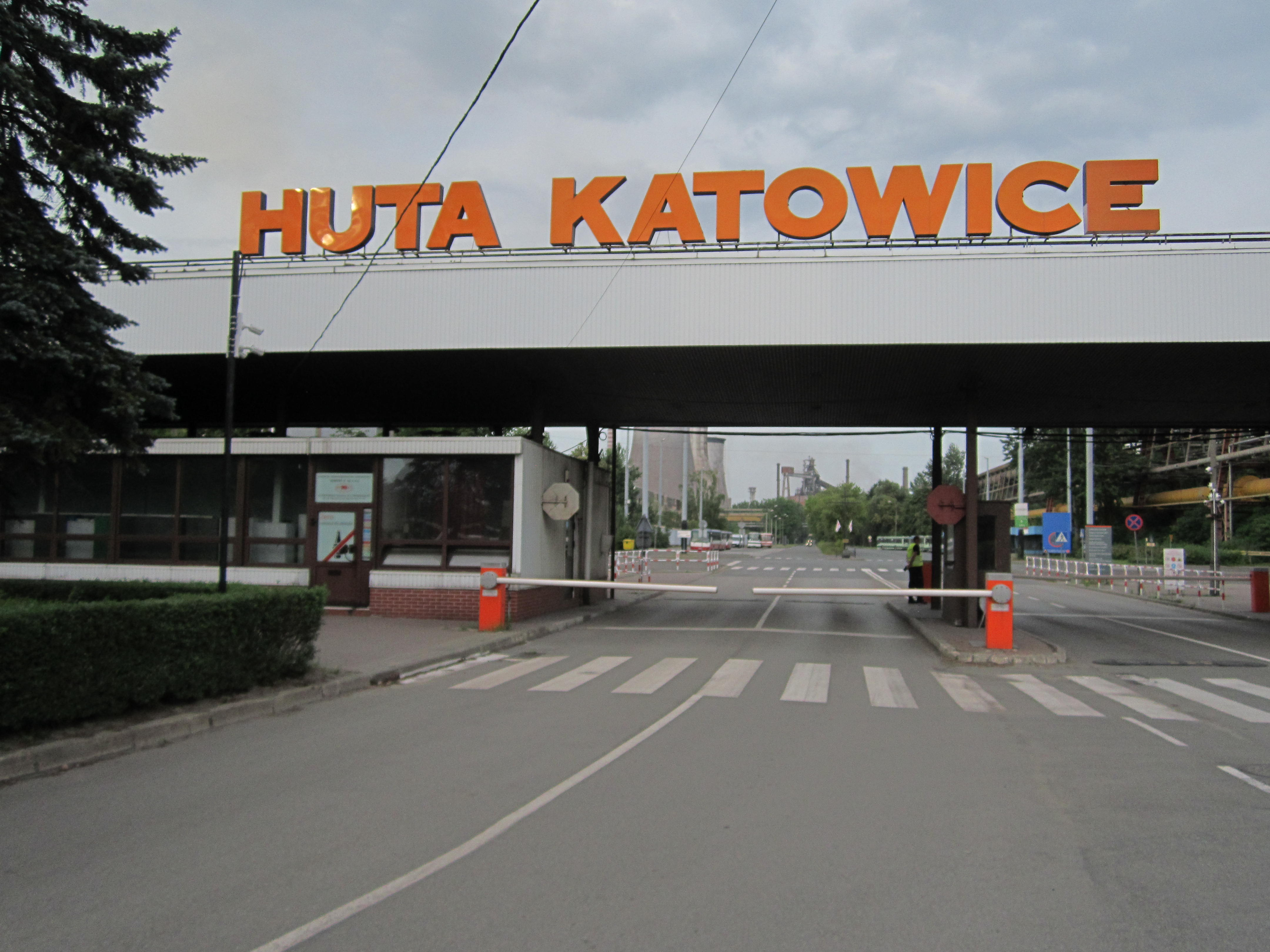
Main Gate

Katowice Steelworks (Polish: Huta Katowice) is a large steel plant, located in southern Poland, on the boundary between the historical provinces of Lesser Poland and Upper Silesia. The current name of the plant is ArcelorMittal Poland Dąbrowa Górnicza, and its previous names were Mittal Steel Poland, Ispat Polska Stal S.A., and Polskie Huty Stali S.A.. Contrary to its name, Katowice Steelworks is not located in the city of Katowice, but in Dąbrowa Górnicza, which is located east of Katowice.

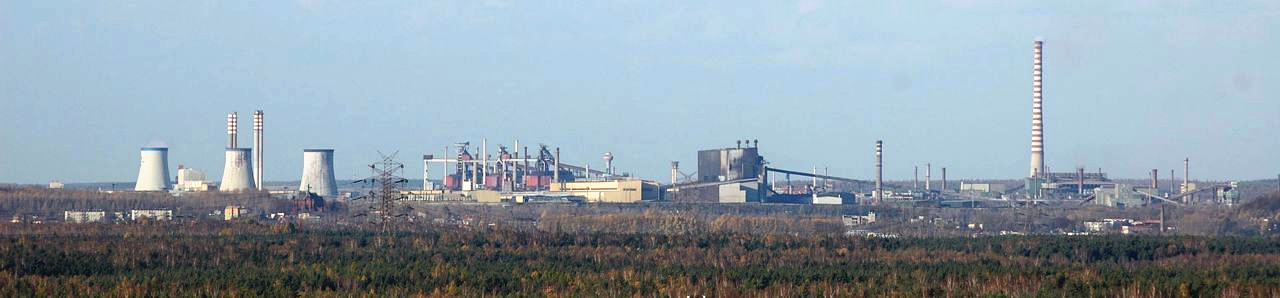
Katowice Steelworks

== History ==
The decision to build a modern, brand new plant, located in a forested area of Zagłębie Dąbrowskie was taken by Edward Gierek during the VI Congress of Polish United Workers' Party, which took place on December 6–11, 1971. The construction was initiated on April 15, 1972, and it brought far-reaching changes to the social structure of the region. Thousands of migrants, mostly from eastern Poland, came to work and live in newly built flats. Furthermore, additional projects, serving the Katowice Steelworks were initiated, such as the Broad Gauge Metallurgy Line, which was used to transport iron ore from the Soviet Union.

Construction of the plant was carried out with cooperation with Soviet experts, and the honorary title of the First Worker was granted to Leonid Brezhnev. Altogether, some 50,000 workers took part in the project. First unit of the plant was opened in 1975, and in May 1976, Metallurgical Corporation Huta Katowice (Kombinat Metalurgiczny Huta Katowice) was created, which, besides the plant itself, also included Felix Dzerzhinsky Steelwork (now Huta Bankowa) in Dąbrowa Górnicza, and Coke Plant in Zdzieszowice. On December 2, 1976, at 7 a.m., the blast furnace was fired for the first time, and on December 3, 1976, first 30 tons of pig iron were retrieved.

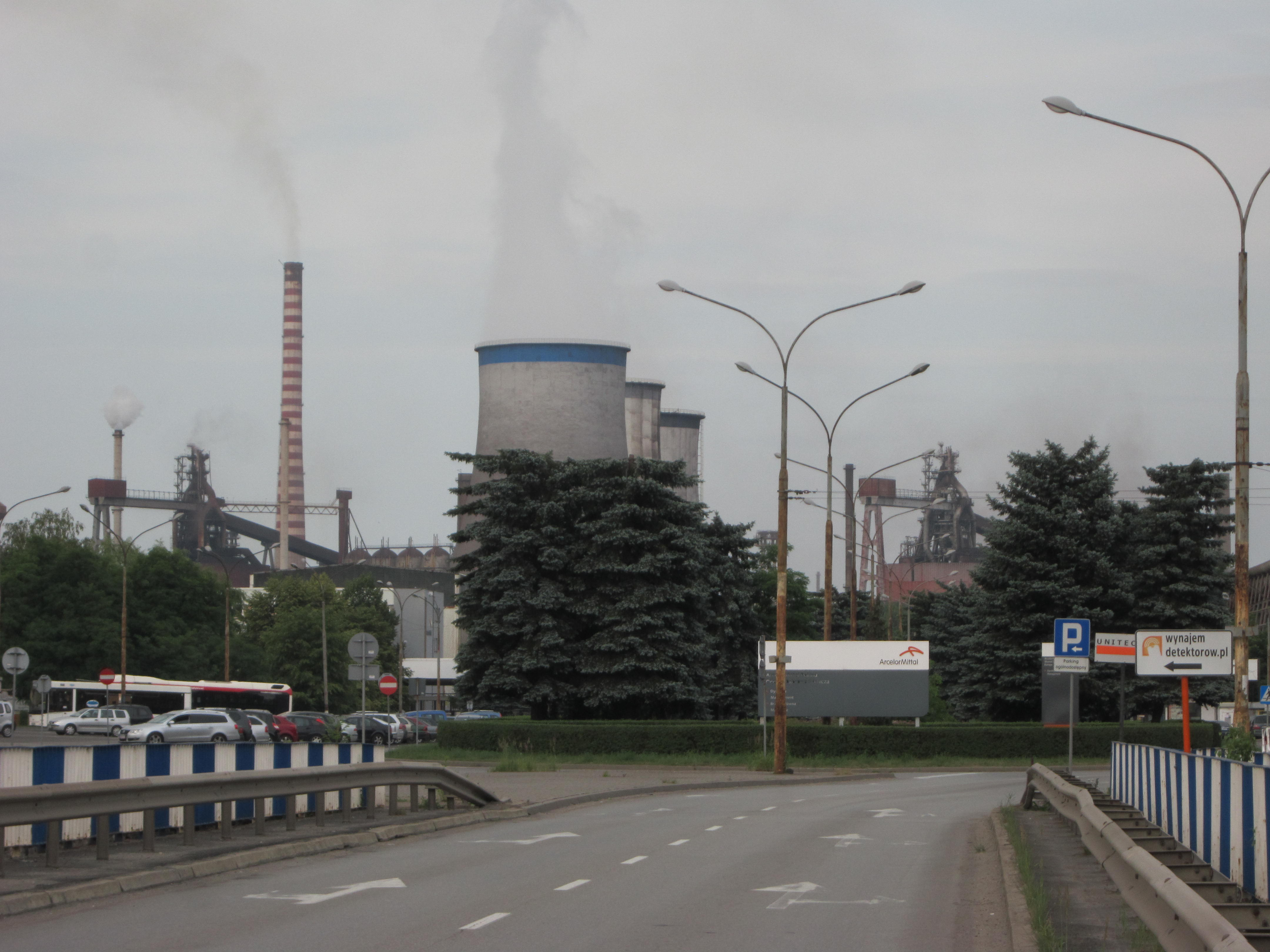
Blast furnaces and the power station

In 1980–1981, Katowice Steelworks was one of main centers of the Solidarity trade union. The first strike began there on August 29, 1980, and on September 11, 1980, the Katowice Agreement was signed in Katowice Steelworks, which was the fourth and final agreement between the newly created free trade union and the Communist government (Gdańsk Agreement, Szczecin Agreement, Jastrzębie-Zdrój Agreement). Plant's Solidarity activists, headed by Andrzej Rozpłochowski, were very active, publishing several magazines, such as Free Trade-Unionist (Wolny Związkowiec), and Solidarity News (Wiadomości Solidarności) and organizing protests and industrial actions. In the night of August 14/15, 1981, “unknown individuals” destroyed Solidarity's publishing equipment in Katowice Steelworks.

On December 12, 1981, a few hours before announcement of the martial law in Poland, Communist services arrested 36 Solidarity leaders of the plant, out of the list of 38. On December 13, 1981, at 5:40 in the morning, workers of both night and day shifts declared a strike and blocked all gates to the enterprise. On the next day, security forces stormed the plant, arresting 100 people. The strike nevertheless continued, and on December 16, some 6,200 workers participated in it. In the following days, military authorities amassed more than 4,000 officers and soldiers, together with helicopters and armoured carriers. They prepared an attack on the plant, but the workers, after a demonstration of force, finally gave up. The protest ended on December 23, at 1 p.m., with protesting workers leaving the plant and the police arresting hundreds.

After the collapse of the Communist system, Katowice Steelworks lost its Eastern markets and the plant had financial problems. In 1994, a large strike took place there, with workers demanding better salaries. In the following years, the situation did not improve and by 2000, bankruptcy of the plant was considered. In 2003, Katowice Steelworks joined Polskie Huty Stali S.A., and on January 14, 2005, it changed its name to Mittal Steel Poland S.A., becoming part of Mittal Steel. In 1992, the plant employed 23,240; by 2006, the number of employees had been reduced to 4,073. Among other things, it manufactures rail and streetcar tracks.
