= 1992 in Poland =

- Decades: 1970s; 1980s; 1990s; 2000s; 2010s
- See also: Other events of 1992; Timeline of Polish history

Events during the year 1992 in Poland.

== Incumbents ==
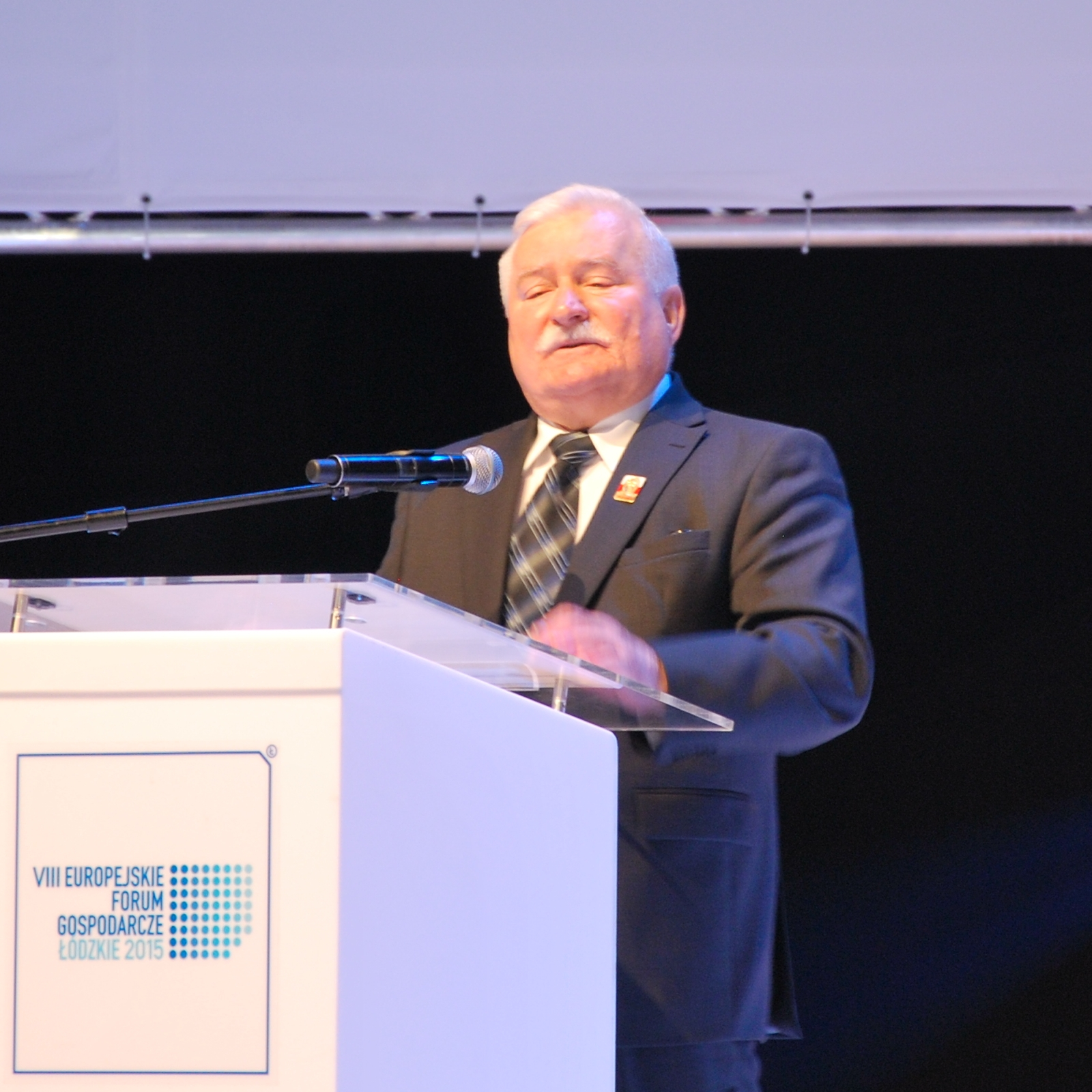
Lech Wałęsa

Incumbents
Position	Person	Party	Notes
President	Lech Wałęsa		
Prime Minister	Jan Olszewski	Centre Agreement (PC)	Until 5 June
Prime Minister	Waldemar Pawlak	Polish People's Party (PSL)	5 June - 10 July
Prime Minister	Hanna Suchocka	Democratic Union (UD)	from 11 July

== Events ==
- 2 March – Poland establishes diplomatic relations with Belarus, becoming one of the first countries to recognise the independence of Belarus.
- 16 October – A new Act of Parliament re-establishes the former Order of Merit of the Polish People's Republic under the new name Order of Merit of the Republic of Poland (Order Zasługi Rzeczypospolitej Polskiej).

== Births ==
- 27 June: Michał Daszek, handball player
- 27 November: Tola Szlagowska, singer

== Deaths ==
- 18 May: Janusz Kruk, musician (born 1946)
- 22 December: Milo Sperber, actor, director and writer (born 1911)
