= 1897 in Poland =

- Decades: 1870s; 1880s; 1890s; 1900s; 1910s
- See also: Other events of 1897; Timeline of Polish history

Events from the year 1897 in Poland

== Births ==
- February 8 – Stanisław Milski in Czchów
- March 13 – Tadeusz Vetulani in Sanok
- March 16 – Józef Lange in Warsaw
- March 28 – Jerzy Zabielski in Warsaw
- July 7 – Michał Antoniewicz in Kraków
- December 5 – Władysław Świątek in Inowrocław

== Deaths ==
- August 26 – Maria Ilnicka in Warsaw
- June 16 – Antonina Hoffmann in Kraków
- Pavel Kuczynski
