= 1807 in Poland =

- Decades: 1780s; 1790s; 1800s; 1810s; 1820s
- See also: Other events of 1807; Timeline of Polish history

Events from the year 1807 in Poland

== Incumbents ==
- Monarch – Frederick Augustus I (from 9 June)

== Events ==
- Battle of Ostrołęka (1807)
- Sejm of the Duchy of Warsaw
- Duchy of Warsaw
- Battle of Eylau

== Births ==
- Karol_Antoniewicz jesuit and missionary
- Antonina_Palczewska ballet dancer

== Deaths ==
- Franciszek Smuglewicz draughtsman and painter
- Franciszek Dionizy Kniaźnin poet
- Zofia Dmuszewska actor and opera singer
