= 1788 in Poland =

Events from the year 1788 in Poland.

== Incumbents ==
- Monarch – Stanisław II August

== Events ==
- Great Sejm
- Polish–Lithuanian Commonwealth
- First Partition of Poland
- Permanent Council

== Births ==
- Karol Turno
- Arthur Schopenhauer

== Deaths ==
- Jason Smogorzewski
