= 1997 in Poland =

- Decades: 1970s; 1980s; 1990s; 2000s; 2010s
- See also: Other events of 1997; Timeline of Polish history

Events during the year 1997 in Poland.

== Incumbents ==
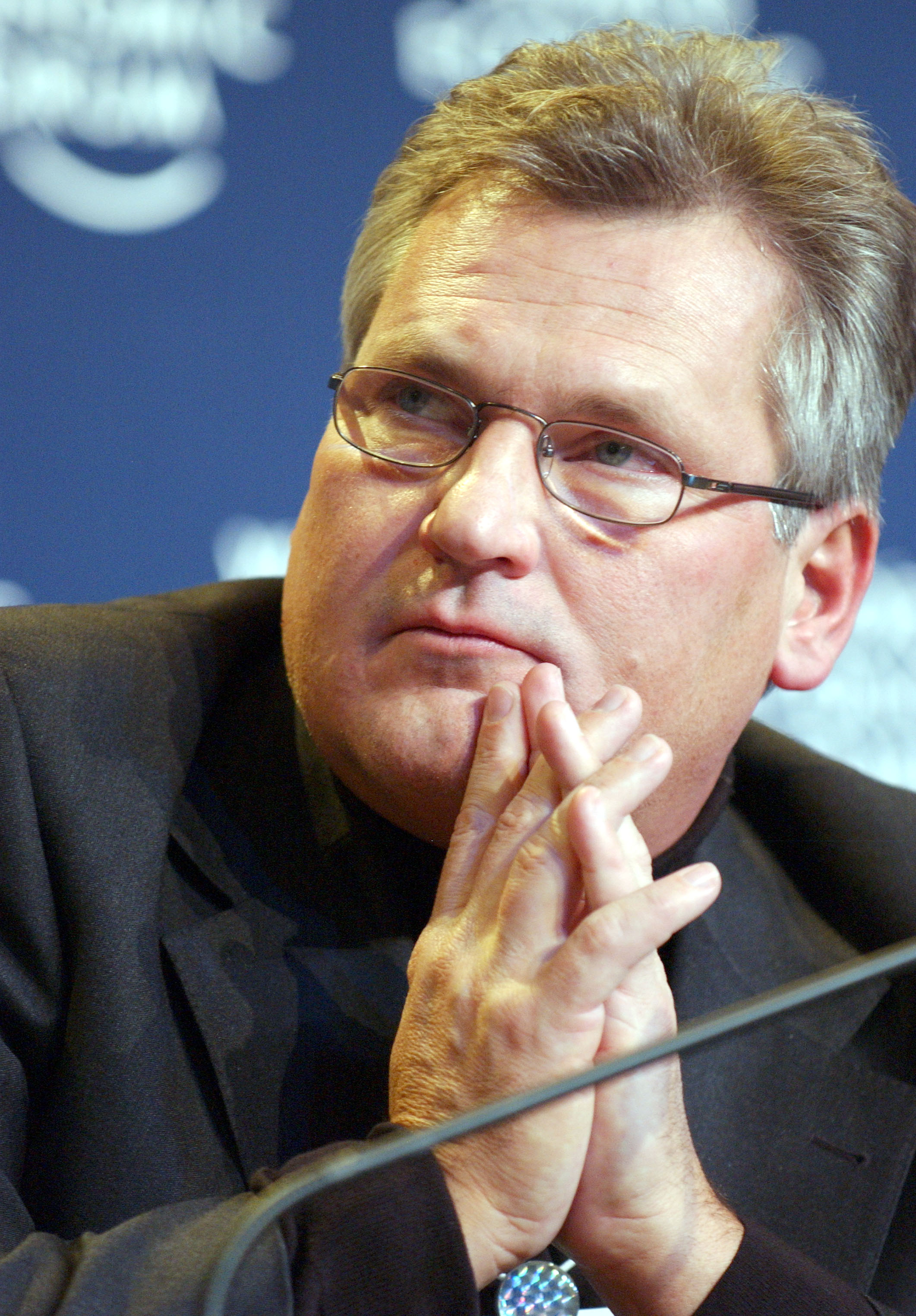
Aleksander Kwaśniewski

Incumbents
Position	Person	Party	Notes
President	Aleksander Kwaśniewski		
Prime Minister	Włodzimierz Cimoszewicz	Democratic Left Alliance	Until 31 October.
Prime Minister	Jerzy Buzek	Solidarity Electoral Action	From 31 October.
Marshal of the Sejm	Józef Zych	Polish People's Party	Until 20 October.
Marshal of the Sejm	Maciej Płażyński	Solidarity Electoral Action	From 20 October.
Marshal of the Senate	Adam Struzik	Polish Peasant Party	Until 21 October.
Marshal of the Senate	Alicja Grześkowiak	Solidarity Electoral Action	From 21 October.

== Events ==
=== January ===
- 1 January:
  - Skępe regained its town rights.
  - Pasym, Radlin, Siechnice and Świątniki Górne were granted town rights.

=== February ===
- 1 February – The Poznań Fast Tram was opened.

=== March ===
- 1 March – Polsat 2 television channel launched.

=== April ===
- 2 April – The Constitution of Poland was adopted by the National Assembly.

=== May ===
- 5 May – 12 were killed and 36 others injured in the Reptowo rail crash.
- 25 May – A constitutional referendum was held. The new constitution was narrowly approved, with 53.5% voting in favor. The voter turnout was 43.9%.

=== June ===
- 8 June – Queen Jadwiga of Poland was canonized by Pope John Paul II in Kraków.
- 10 June – John of Dukla was canonized by Pope John Paul II in Krosno as part of the Papal visit from 31 May to 10 June.
- 19 June – The University of Białystok was established.

=== July ===
- 6 July – 1997 Central European flood: Flooding began in Poland in the towns of Głuchołazy and Prudnik.
- 8 July - At the 1997 Madrid NATO summit Poland, together with Hungary and the Czech Republic, receives an invitation to join NATO.
- 10 July – 1997 Central European flood: Left-bank Opole was flooded.
- 12 July – 1997 Central European flood: Wrocław was flooded.
- 18 July – 1997 Central European flood: A day of national mourning for the victims of the flood was declared by President Aleksander Kwaśniewski.

=== September ===
- 21 September – The 1997 Polish parliamentary election was held, won by the Solidarity Electoral Action.

=== October ===
- 3 October – TVN television station launched.
- 17 October – The Constitution of Poland came into effect.

19-20 October - The Sejm cross was hung in the building of the Sejm of the Republic of Poland, the lower house of the Polish parliament. by a Solidarity Electoral Action (AWS) MP Tomasz Wójcik. it has hung in the sejm since 1997.

- 31 October – Jerzy Buzek became the Prime Minister of Poland.

=== November ===
- 11 November – The Cabinet of Jerzy Buzek passed the vote of confidence.

=== December ===
- 15 December – The Monument to the Heroes of Warsaw was placed on a new pedestal in Warsaw.

== Deaths ==
=== January ===
- 6 January – Edward Osóbka-Morawski, activist and politician, Chairman of the Polish Committee of National Liberation (b. 1909)
- 26 January – Mira Zimińska, film actress, director of the Mazowsze folk group (b. 1901)

=== February ===
- 27 February – Mieczysław Jagielski, economist and politician, Deputy Prime Minister of the People's Republic of Poland (b. 1924)

=== March ===
- 7 March – Agnieszka Osiecka, poet, writer, scenarist, film director, journalist, and songwriter (b. 1936)

=== April ===
- 27 April – Piotr Skrzynecki, choreographer, director, and cabaret impresario, creator of the Piwnica pod Baranami literary cabaret (b. 1930)

=== August ===
- 9 August – Robert Satanowski, general, later an orchestra and opera director (b. 1918)
- 30 August – Ernst Wilimowski, German–Polish football player (b. 1916)

=== September ===
- 4 September – Alfred Kałuziński, handball player (b. 1952)

=== October ===
- 18 October – Leonard Andrzejewski, actor (b. 1924)
- 31 October – Tadeusz Janczar, film actor (b. 1926)
