= 1794 in Poland =

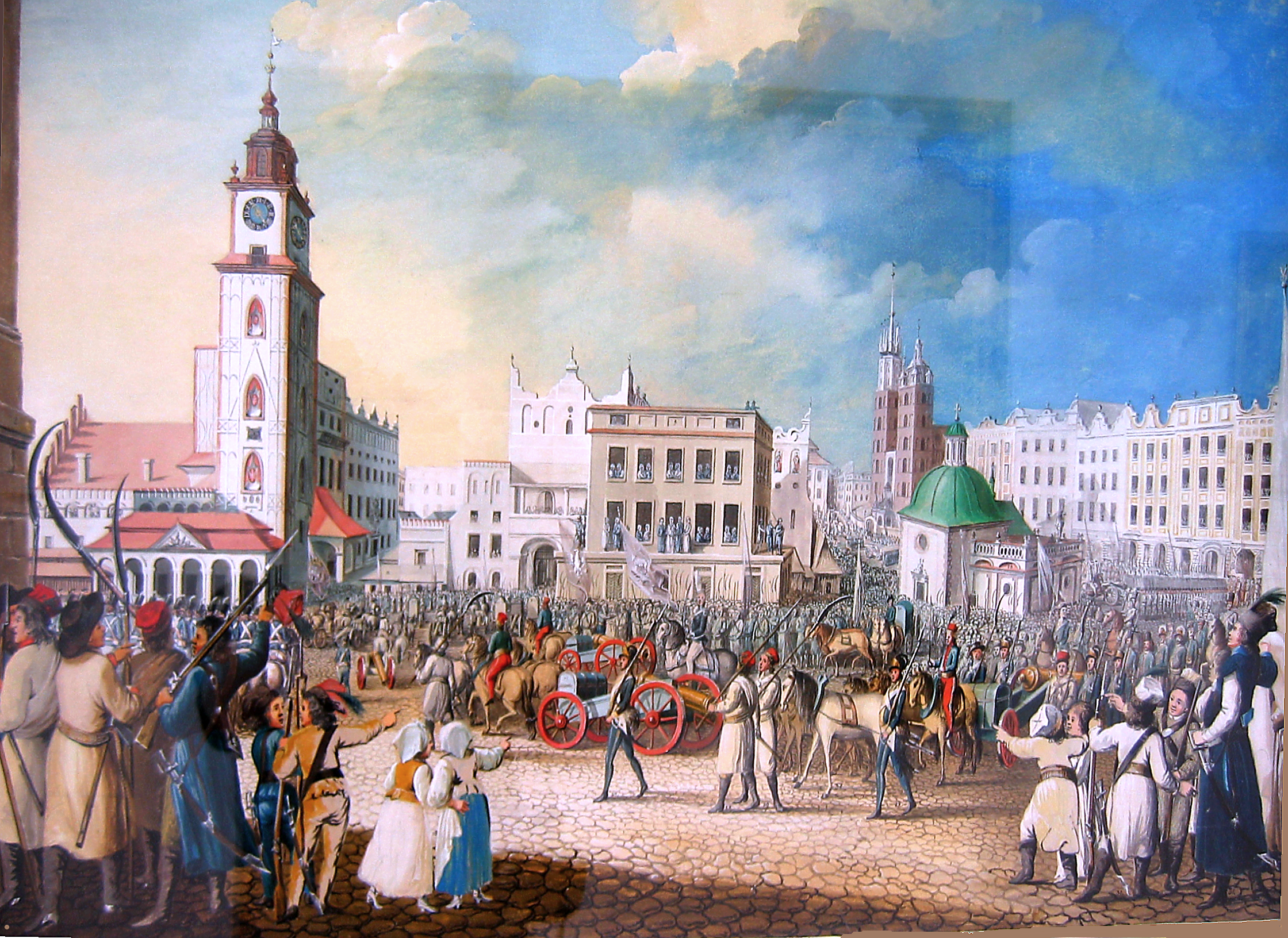
Introduction to Kraków of 12 Russian cannons captured in the Battle of Racławice in 1794. Painting by Michał Stachowicz

Events from the year 1794 in Poland

== Incumbents ==
- Monarch – Stanisław II August

== Events ==
- Warsaw Uprising (1794)
- Wilno Uprising (1794)

== Births ==
- 14 March - Józef Zachariasz Bem, engineer and general
