= 1772 in Poland =

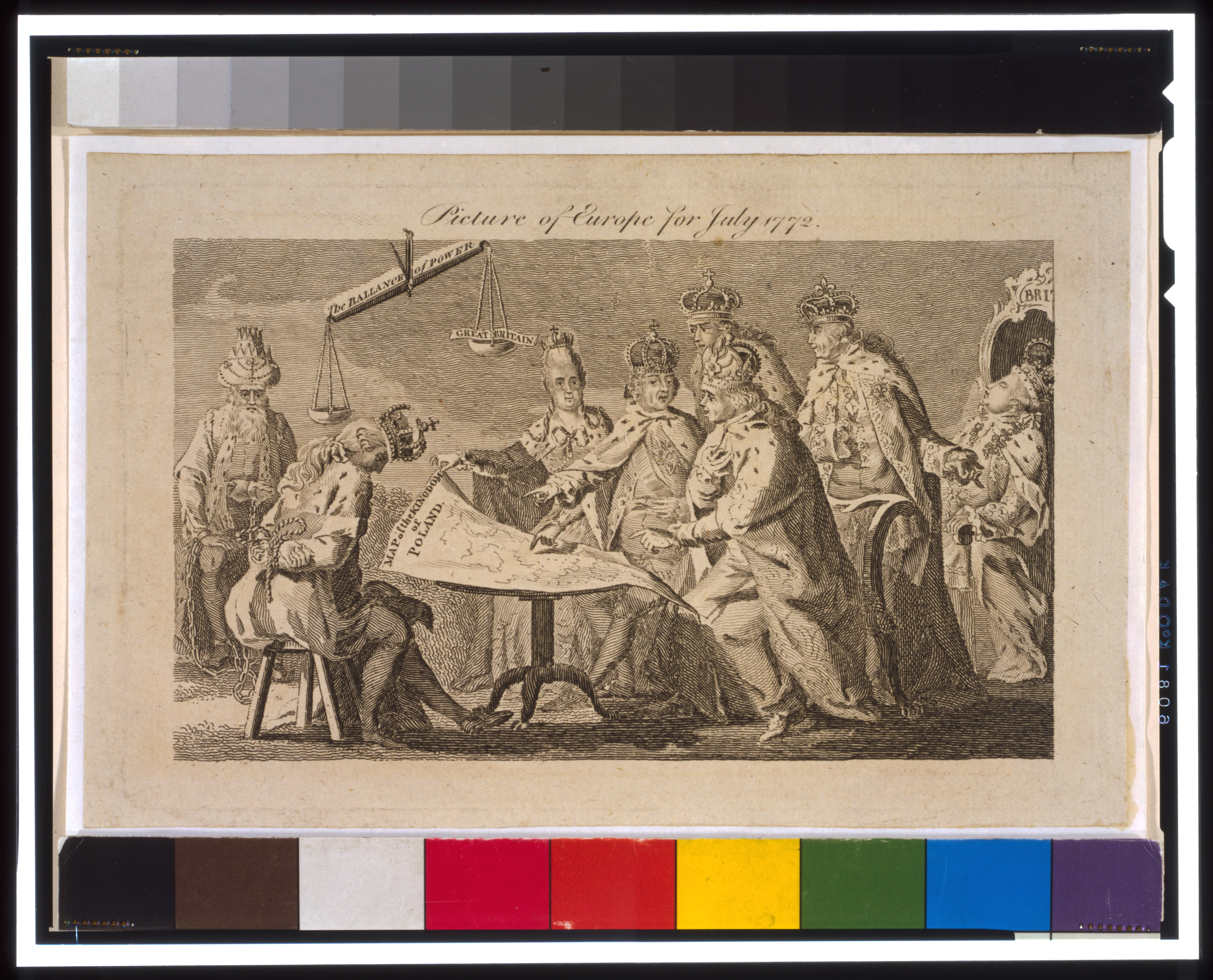
Picture of Europe for July 1772 LCCN99404819

An historic events from the year 1772 in Poland

== Incumbents ==
- Monarch – Stanisław II August

== Events ==
- First Partition of Poland
- Kingdom of Galicia and Lodomeria
