= 1773 in Poland =

Events from the year 1773 in Poland.

== Incumbents ==
- Monarch – Stanisław II August

== Events ==
- Commission of National Education
