= 1795 in Poland =

Events from the year 1795 in Poland

== Events ==
- Third Partition of Poland
- Abdication of King Stanisław August Poniatowski
- The Duchy of Courland and Semigallia were forced to be annexed into Russian rule.

== Deaths ==
- November 18 – Jan August Cichocki, military officer (b. 1750))
