= Jastrzębie-Zdrój Agreement =

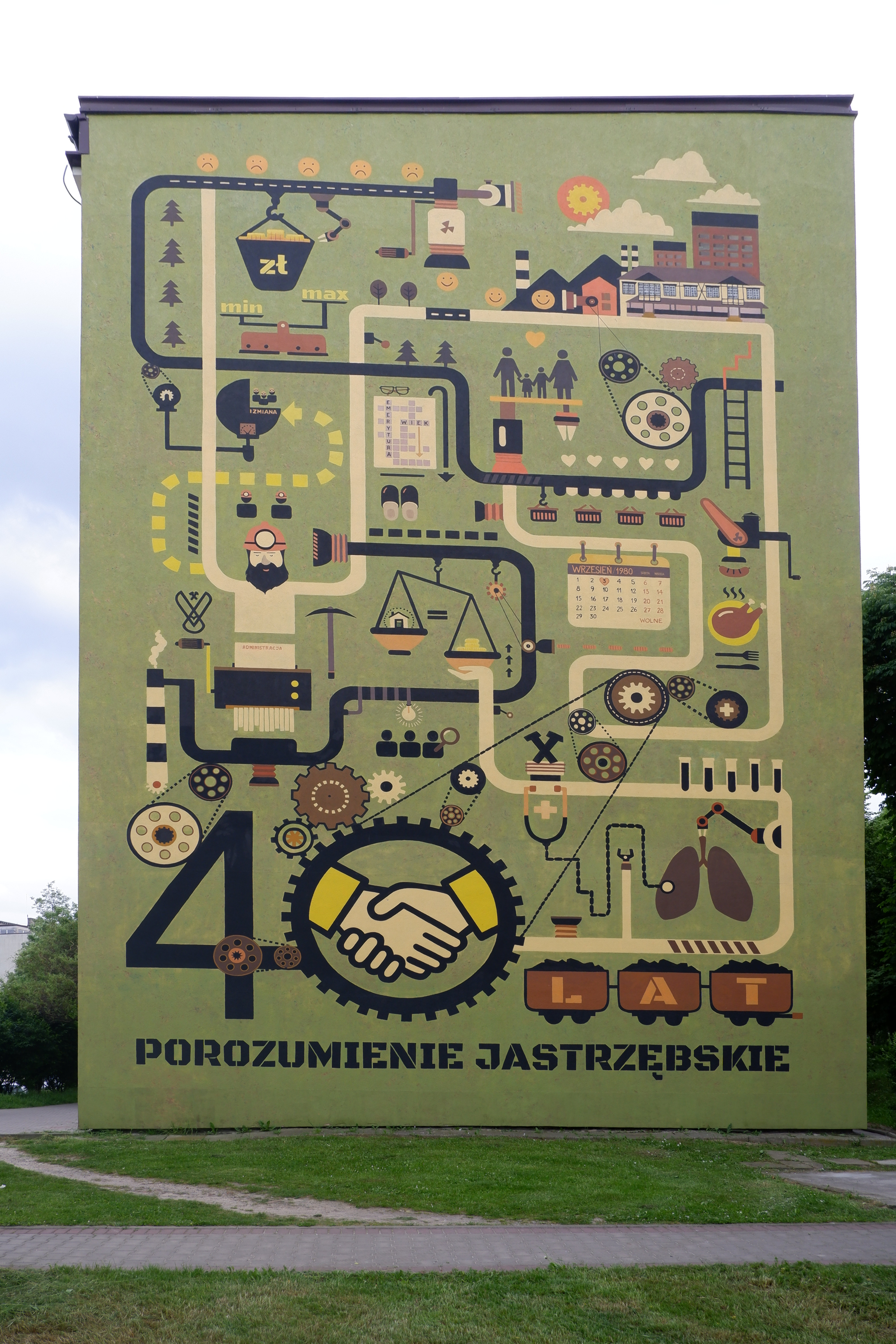
Mural commemorating the 40th anniversary of the signing of the Agreement on a residential block on Śląska Street in Jastrzębie-Zdrój

Jastrzębie-Zdrój Agreement (Polish: Porozumienie jastrzebskie) was an accord, signed on September 3, 1980, at Manifest Lipcowy Coal Mine in Jastrzębie-Zdrój, between the authorities of the People's Republic of Poland, and the Jastrzebie-Zdroj Interfactory Strike Committee. The agreement was signed by a government envoy Aleksander Kopec, and leader of the committee, Jaroslaw Sienkiewicz. It was the last of the three accords, signed in late summer of 1980 in Poland. These accords resulted in creation of Solidarity, and as such, Jastrzębie-Zdrój Agreement is regarded as part of the August Agreements.

Coal miners from Upper Silesian city of Jastrzębie-Zdrój went on strike in late August 1980 (see Jastrzębie-Zdrój 1980 strikes), and during negotiations with the government, they based their demands on the 21 demands of MKS, to which the miners added their own points. After lengthy negotiations, Polish government accepted the agreement, and among accepted demands of the miners, were:

- steady rise in salaries in connection with rising costs of living,
- introduction of work-free weekends,
- introduction of minimum pay and maximum number of working hours,
- lowering of retirement age for those miners who work underground (presented to the Sejm for acceptance),
- abolition of four-shift system at some mines,
- extra financial bonuses for those miners who lived away from their families,
- recognition of pneumoconiosis as an occupational disease,
- improvement in deliveries of meats and meat products
- coal bonuses for all coal mining industry workers,
- limits of government administration.
