= 1791 in Poland =

Events from the year 1791 in Poland

== Incumbents ==
- Monarch – Stanisław II August

== Events ==
- Constitution of May 3, 1791
- Friends of the Constitution
- Guardians of the Laws

== Religion ==
"The dominant national religion is and shall be the sacred Roman Catholic"

Roman catholic
