= Antonina Palczewska =

Polish ballet dancer

Antonina Palczewska (1807–1850), was a Polish ballet dancer. She was among the better-known ballet dancers in Poland during her career.

She was engaged in the Ballet at the National Theatre, Warsaw between 1820 and 1829.
