= Kajetan Garbiński =

Polish mathematician and professor

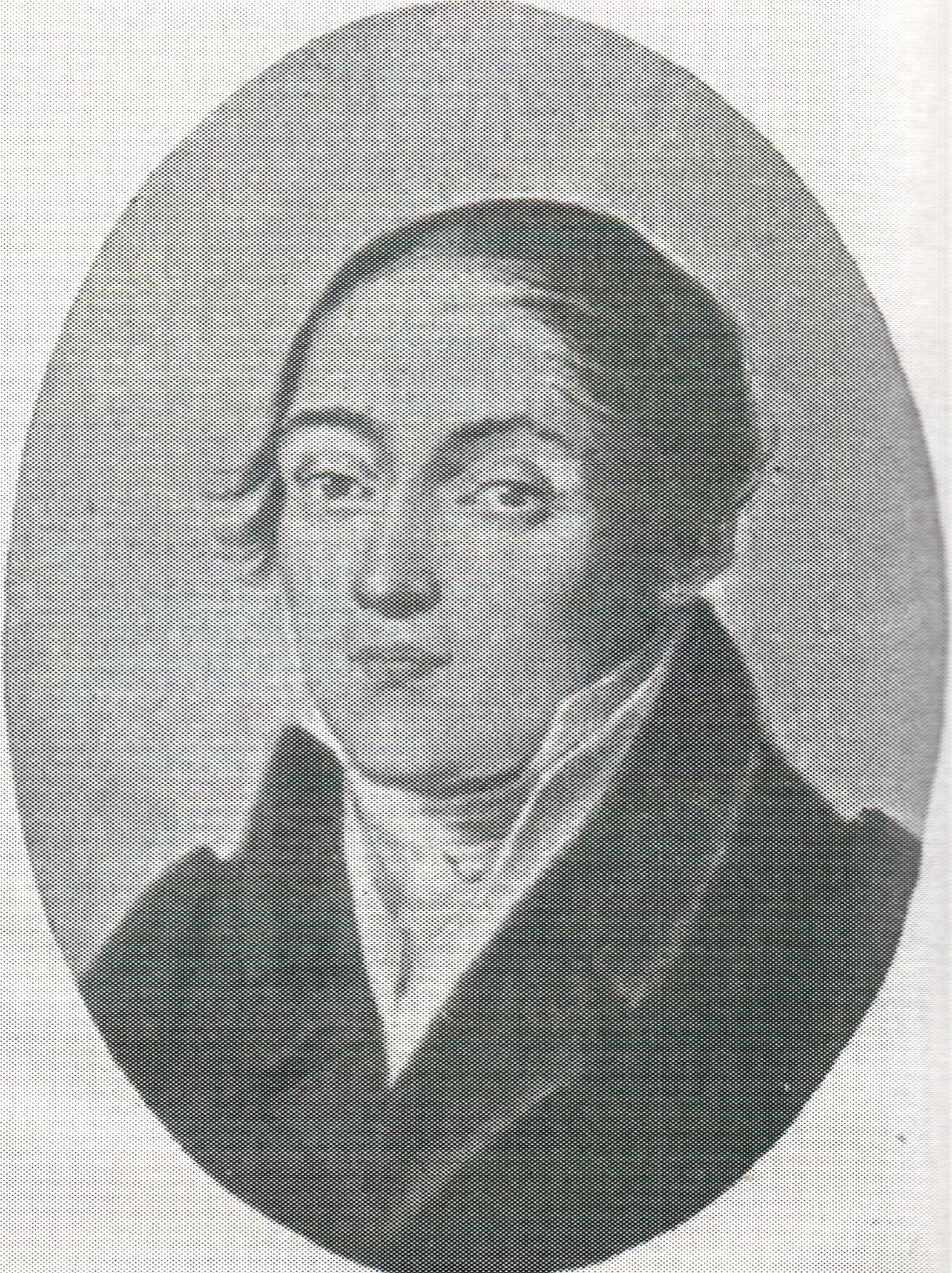
Kajetan Garbiński

Kajetan Garbiński (1796–1847) was a Polish mathematician and prominent professor at the University of Warsaw. Minister of religion and education in the revolutionary Polish National Government during the November Uprising in 1831.

A graduate of the Collège de France and the École Polytechnique in Paris, he became director of the Preparatory School for the Institute of Technology, the predecessor of the Warsaw University of Technology in Sorbonne.
