= Paweł Kuczynski =

Polish composer

Paweł Kuczynski (1846–1897) was a Polish composer.

== Selected works ==
- Gesang des Turmwächters (from the opera Magrita)
- Fahrt zum Licht
- Gesang an die Ruhe
- Totenklage
- Geschenke der Genien
- Neujahrsgesang
- Bergpredigt (for baritone, chorus and orchestra)
- 130. psalm
- piano pieces (Humoreske, Karnevalswalzer, Intermezzo, Phantasiestück)
