= 1970 in Poland =

- Decades: 1950s; 1960s; 1970s; 1980s; 1990s
- See also: Other events of 1970; Timeline of Polish history

== Incumbents ==
=== Members of the government ===
- Prime Ministers of Poland - Józef Cyrankiewicz (until 23 December); Piotr Jaroszewicz (from 23 December)

=== Other personalities ===
- Roman Catholic Primate of Poland - Stefan Wyszyński
- President of Polish government-in-exile - August Zaleski
- Prime Minister of Polish government-in-exile - Aleksander Zawisza (until 9 June); Zygmunt Muchniewski (from 20 July)

== Events ==
- 1 November – Polish Deputy Foreign Minister Zygfryd Wolniak and three other people are killed in an attack on a group of diplomats at Karachi airport in Pakistan.
- 7 December – While visiting Warsaw, German Chancellor Willy Brandt goes down on his knees in front of a monument to the victims of the Warsaw Ghetto, which will become known as the Kniefall von Warschau ("Warsaw Genuflection").
- 13 December – The government announces food price increases.
- 15 December – Polish 1970 protests: Riots and looting lead to a confrontation with the government.
- 17 December – Soldiers fire on civilians returning to work in Gdynia. Martial law is imposed throughout the country until December 22.
- 20 December – General Secretary of the Polish United Workers' Party, Władysław Gomułka, resigns, and is replaced by Edward Gierek.
- 23 December – The government freezes food prices for two years.

== Births ==
- 4 June – Izabella Scorupco, actress and model
- 26 June – Paweł Nastula, judoka and mixed martial artist

== Deaths ==
- 14 June – Roman Ingarden, philosopher (b. 1893)
