= Stefan Tyszko =

Stefan Tyszko was a London-based photographer who died in a car crash with two other journalists in August 1969. His archive is now represented by Getty Images.

He was survived by three sisters and his brother the artist and broadcaster Simon Tyszko, who now curates Stefan's works as part of his own practice. His brief career spanned fashion, portraiture and photojournalism, regularly contributing to international publications, including Vogue, Nova, The Times and The Telegraph. The Independent Magazine (UK) produced a cover article in February 2000, written by long time Vogue (UK) contributing editor Robin Muir, featuring his work as a unique lost talent from the 1960s.

He was one of the first western journalists to reach Prague when the Russian invaded in 1968, with his pictures being used around the world.

His work featured in both the 1967, 1968 and 1969 editions of Photography Year Book.

He was killed in a collision with a brick lorry on an Essex road, along with Lady Catherine Pakenham youngest daughter of the Earl and Countess of Longford, and Gina Richardson a journalist from the Sunday Telegraph (famous for her revealing interviews with Mick Jagger and Marianne Faithfull).
