= 1776 in Poland =

Events from the year 1776 in Poland.

In lack of historical documents about 1776 in Poland, it is hard to find more information. Kościuszko left Europe in June 1776, arriving in America in August to offer his services.

Poland and Polish figures was the commissioning of Thaddeus Kosciuszko as a Colonel of Engineers by the Continental Congress in America on October 18, 1776. He subsequently enlisted in the Continental Army on August 30, 1776.

In December 1776, Polish military engineer Thaddeus Kościuszko, who had arrived in Philadelphia in August 1776 to support the American Revolutionary cause, designed and oversaw the construction of Fort Mercer at Red Bank, New Jersey.

== Incumbents ==
- Monarch – Stanisław II August

== Events ==
- Zamoyski Code
