= 1996 in Poland =

- Decades: 1970s; 1980s; 1990s; 2000s; 2010s
- See also: Other events of 1996; Timeline of Polish history

Events during the year 1996 in Poland.

== Incumbents ==
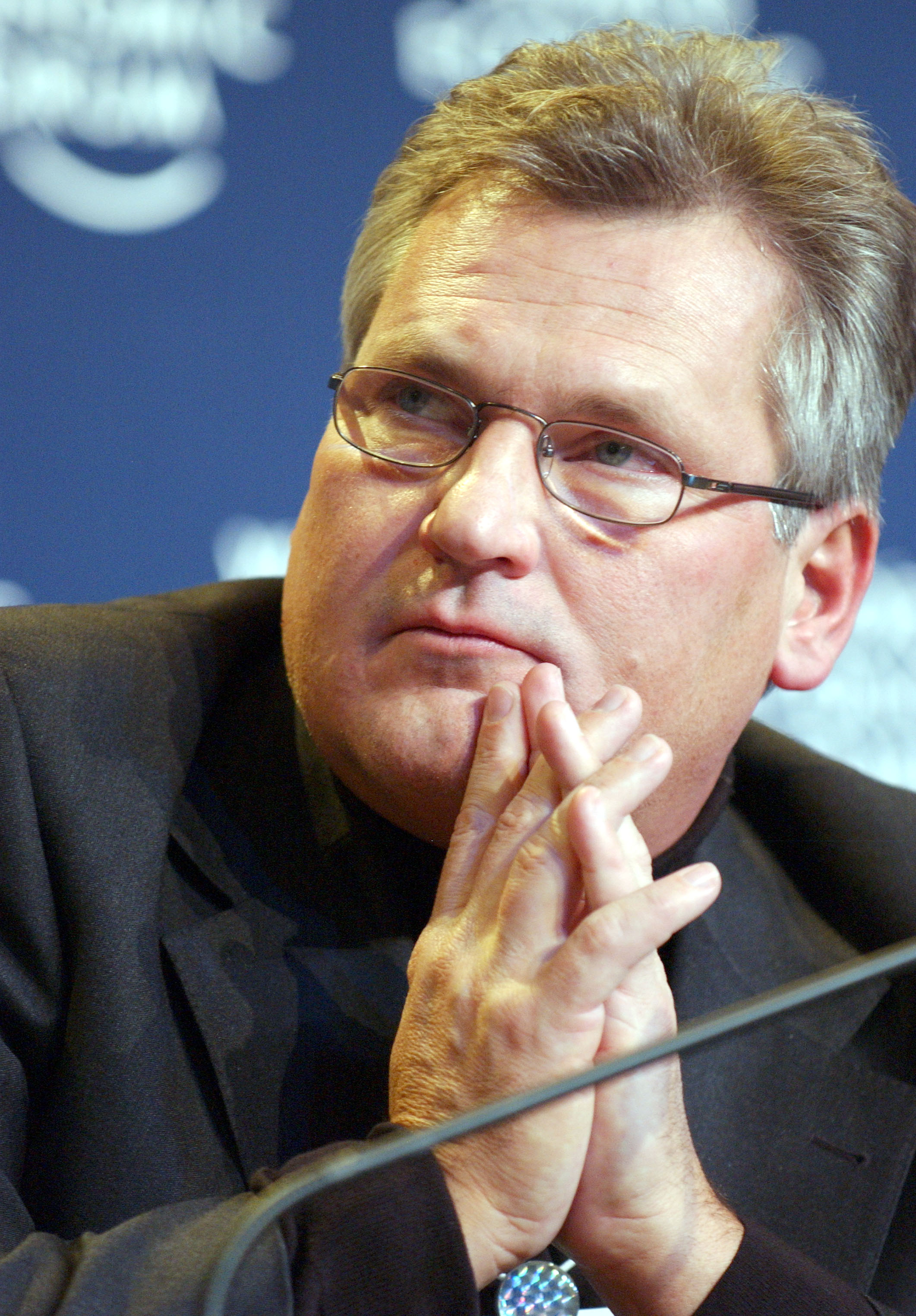
Aleksander Kwaśniewski

Incumbents
Position	Person	Party	Notes
President	Aleksander Kwaśniewski		
Prime Minister	Józef Oleksy	Democratic Left Alliance	Until 7 February
Prime Minister	Włodzimierz Cimoszewicz	Democratic Left Alliance	From 7 February
Marshal of the Sejm	Józef Zych	Polish People's Party	
Marshal of the Senate	Adam Struzik	Polish Peasant Party	

== Events ==
- 18 February – A double referendum is held. The voter turnout of 32% is well below the 50% threshold required to make the results valid.

== Births ==
- 13 January: Kamil Majchrzak, tennis player
- 2 May: Klaudia Kardasz, shot putter

== Deaths ==
- 26 February: Mieczysław Weinberg, composer (born 1919)
- 13 March: Krzysztof Kieślowski, film director and screenwriter (born 1941)
