= Fibiger (crater) =

Crater on the Moon

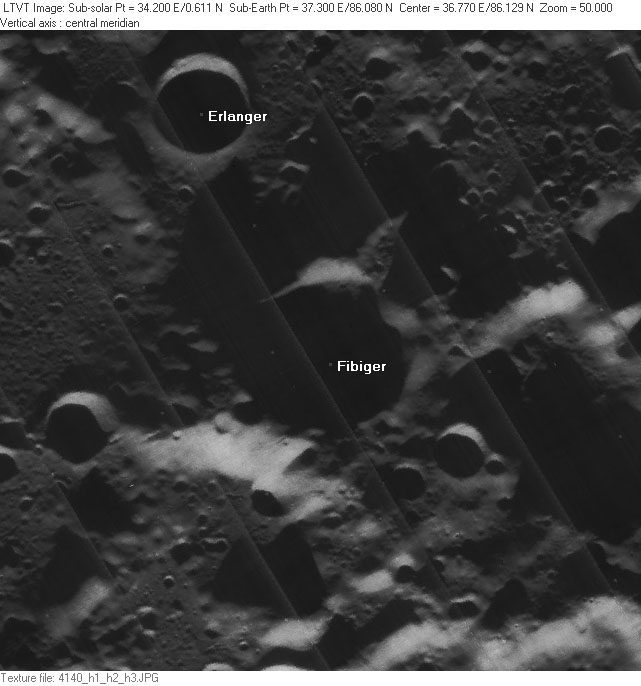
- Fibiger crater near Erlanger
- Coordinates: 86.0°N 37.3°E
- Diameter: 21.10 km (13.11 mi)
- Eponym: Johannes Andreas Grib Fibiger

Fibiger is a small lunar impact crater located on the near side of the Moon near the northern pole. The nearest major feature is the Byrd crater, to the southwest. Located just north of Fibiger are craters Erlanger and Peary, which are 9.9 km and 73 km in diameter, respectively.

The interior base of this crater includes a permanently shadowed region that spans a total surface area of 130.56 km^{2}. It includes two doubly-shadowed regions with temperatures of 80 K or lower, serving as a cold trap. Measurements of this crater from the Lunar Reconnaissance Orbiter indicate it is a region of enhanced hydrogen concentration, and hence may include water ice deposits.

This formation was named after Danish pathologist and Nobel laurette Johannes Andreas Grib Fibiger (1867-1928). Its designation was formally adopted by the International Astronomical Union on January 22, 2009.
