= 1786 in Poland =

Events from the year 1786 in Poland

== Incumbents ==
- Monarch – Stanisław II August

== Events ==
- Królikarnia
