= 1789 in Poland =

Events from the year 1789 in Poland

== Incumbents ==
- Monarch – Stanisław II August

== Events ==
- Black Procession
- Elimination of the Permanent Council
