= 1792 in Poland =

Events from the year 1792 in Poland

== Incumbents ==
- Monarch – Stanisław II August

== Events ==
- Great Sejm
- Polish–Russian War of 1792
- Targowica Confederation
