= 1793 in Poland =

Events from the year 1793 in Poland

== Incumbents ==
- Monarch – Stanisław II August

== Events ==
- Poznań witch trial- witch trial in village of Doruchów that was the last of such in the Polish-Lithuanian Commomwealth. It would result in six women executed.
- Second Partition of Poland- ended existence of Polish-Lithuanian Commonweallh by 1795.

== Births ==
- Chaim Halberstam of Sanz- Hasidic Rabbi and spiritual leader who founded Sanzer Hasidic dynasty and also authored Divrei Chaim, a rabbinic text.
- Antoni Malczewski- Romantic poet best known for writing Gothic work Maria in 1825. He was also the first Pole to climb Mont Blanc.
- Count Aleksander Fredro- known as creator of Polish national comedy and wrote the comedy Zemsta (The Revenge)
