= Szczecin Agreement =

Strike at Szczecin Shipyard, August 1980

Szczecin Agreement (Polish: Porozumienie szczecińskie) was an accord, signed on August 30, 1980 at 8 a.m. at Szczecin Shipyard, between Polish authorities and the Szczecin Interfactory Strike Committee. The agreement was signed by deputy prime minister Kazimierz Barcikowski, Andrzej Żabiński of the Polish Politburo, and first secretary of the Polish United Workers' Party in Szczecin, Janusz Brych, as well as Marian Jurczyk (chairman of the Strike Committee), Jurczyk's deputy Kazimierz Fischbein, and delegate of the workers, Marian Juszczuk. The Agreement ended mass strikes, which took place in northern Polish city of Szczecin, in August 1980. Even though it was signed one day earlier than the Gdańsk Agreement, and turned out to be workers' success in economic and social matters, unlike in Gdańsk, the government did not promise in Szczecin to create a free, independent trades union. Nevertheless, it was one of the three historic agreements (besides Gdańsk Agreement and Jastrzębie-Zdrój Agreement), which made it possible to create Solidarity. Following protesting workers in Gdańsk (see 21 demands of MKS), a list of 36 demands was also created in Szczecin. Its originally included creation of an independent union, but that demand was later scrapped. Still, the government promised not to punish those responsible for the protests, to introduce pay rises, and to create a comprehensive plan to improve delivery of food products. Furthermore, a plaque at main gate to the Shipyard was promised, to commemorate victims of the Polish 1970 protests. On Monday, September 1, 1980, all striking workers in the city returned to work. The Szczecin Agreement was called "an unprecedented event in the communist camp".

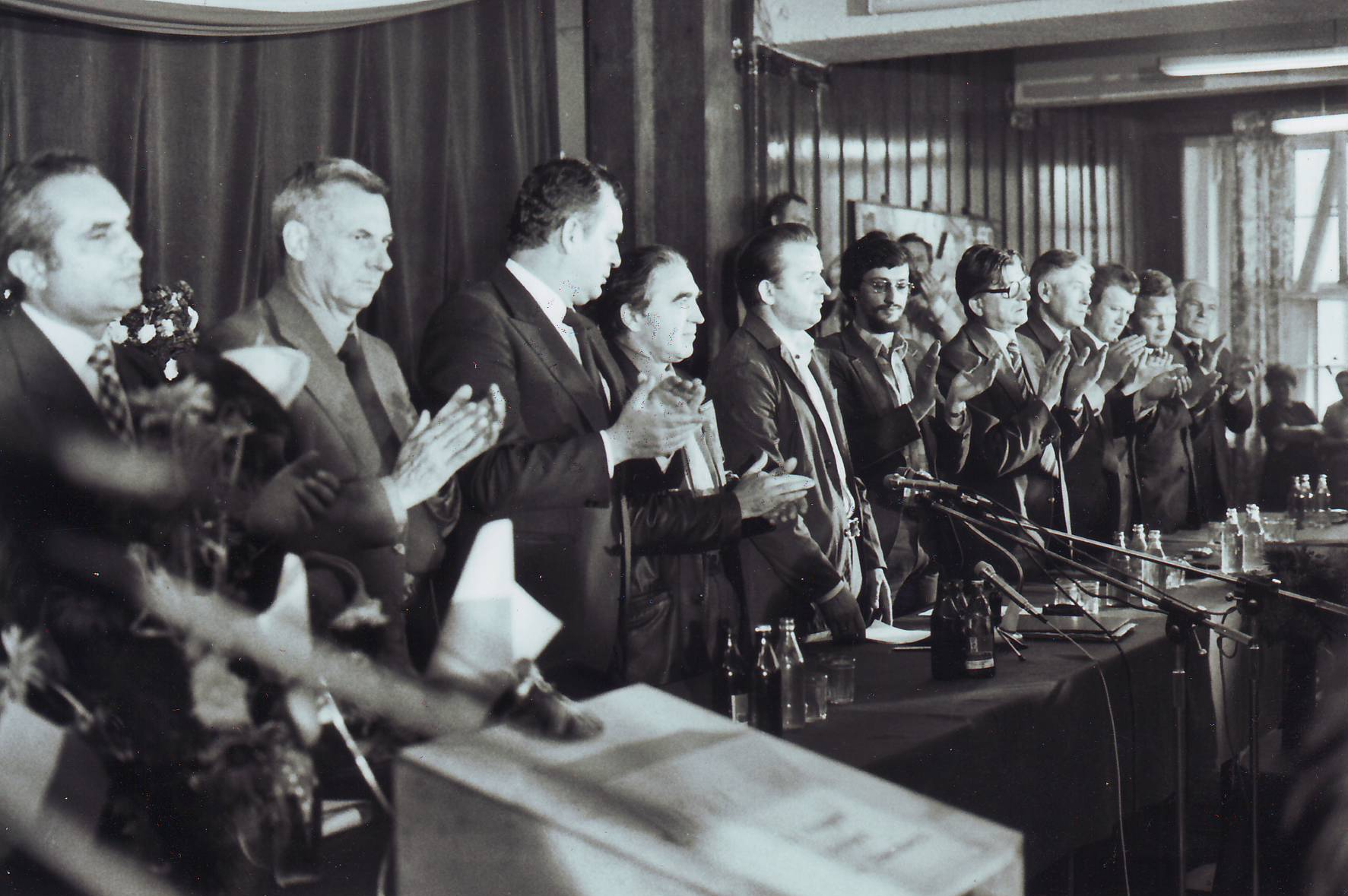
Government and protesting workers representatives during negotiations
