= Stanisław Stolarczyk =

Stanisław Stolarczyk (born 4 May 1949, in Poland), is a journalist, reporter, writer, and documentary of the Polish footprints in Canada. He is a member of the Association of Polish Journalists, the International Federation of Journalists, and the Polish Writers' Union. The author of several books is currently the Editor-in-Chief of the Polish weekly Czas-Związkowiec and the Director of the publishing company FAKTY which specializes in the literature of facts in Toronto.

== Biography: Career as a Journalist, Reporter, Writer, and Documentary ==
After obtaining the title of Bachelor of Arts (BA) in Geology from the University of Warsaw, Stolarczyk completed his studies in Travel at the Institute of Tourism as well as studies in Journalism at the Polish Journalists' Association in Warsaw.

In Poland, he was committed full-time to the monthly newspaper "Gościniec" (as the secretary of the editorial office), he collaborated with the Polish Television, wrote travel guide books "Roztocze Środkowe" ("Roztocze Central"), and "Nadbużańskie Podlasie" ("Above the region of Podlasie"). In 1980, his reporting on ethnic minorities and ethnic groups from the series of "Polska mało znana" ("Little-known Poland"), were awarded by the Board of the Association of Polish Journalists and assigned as the best publication of the year.

In 1981, he moved to London and the highlands of Scotland, where he collected informative material for the book "W górach Europy" ("In the mountains of Europe"). There he also encountered a state of war. In 1983 he moved to Canada. Living in Ottawa, he worked as a journalist for the Polonia Admissions Committee of John Paul II in Canada, resulting in the extensive development of "John Paul II's meeting with the Polish community in Canada". He began a collaboration with the weekly newspaper "Związkowiec", where almost every week he wrote reports in Canada under the title "Reportaże z klonowym listkiem" ("Reports with a maple leaf"), in which he relayed his impressions from a trip across Canada.

From the moment he arrived to Canada, he began to document the traces of the Polish, including Polish cemeteries primarily on the so-called Ontarian Kaszuby. He brainstormed the exact inventory, and later, after doing archival research, he went to Canada in search of the vanishing Polish cemeteries and the rural churches in the provinces. To this end, he ventured his way to Manitoba, Saskatchewan and Alberta. Later, the United States and the former Polish Eastern Borderlands. He has also showcased a photographic exhibit entitled "Raport o polskich cmentarzach w Kanadzie" ("Report on Polish Cemeteries in Canada") in Ottawa, Montreal, Warsaw and Lublin.

In 1987 he took a reporter's journey to the Polar Circle to Fort Simpson (Northwest Territories) to attend the meeting of Pope John Paul II with the Indians, Inuit, and Métis. A year later, he received a scholarship from The Royal Canadian Geographical Society, to write a documentation on "The Polish Geographical Names in Canada".

Compiling material for this project, the author visited various libraries and archives, as well as traveled more than twenty thousand kilometers – a rounded half the circumference of the globe.

He tried to get, there, where many of our countrymen have set foot and tried tirelessly to seek an easier way of life. The main tracks, which he has walked – read similarly as from the map – were of the Polish name. They also became a destination for a reporter. In 1990 he returned to Warsaw, he created a news agency Polonia Service Press, and looked for hidden bank deposits in Sudetenland by the Germans in 1945, (a series of reports from the issue "Złoto Wrocławia?" ("Wrocław's Gold?") and linked with the "Express Wieczorny – Kulisy" ("Evening Express – of Kulisa")). After a nearly two-year stay in Poland, once again he came to Canada as a foreign correspondent of this journal. The result of this work were hundreds of newspaper articles relating to Canada, and reports, including the visit of President Lech Wałęsa in Canada, from the Arctic – obtaining the North Pole by the Poles (Marek Kamiński and Wojciech Moskal), from the mountain expeditions in the massif of Warsaw and the Rocky Mountains, of which he was the organizer and director, or from the participation in the World Championships of Gold Panning in Dawson City of the Yukon.

== Awards ==
- 1980 – received an award from the Head Executive Board of the Association of Polish Journalists for the best publication of the year in Poland
- 2001 – received first prize in the International Literature Competition sponsored by the International Polish Media Forum

== Writings ==
- Spotkanie Jana Pawła II z Polonią kanadyjską (John Paul II's Meeting with the Polish-Canadian Community), 1984
- Gdzie stopy nasze (Where Our Feet Step), 1991
- Hobby Jana Pawła II – gory, narty, kajaki (Hobbies of John Paul II - mountains, skiing, kayaking), 1991 [bestseller in Poland in 1991]
- Tańcząc na wulkanie (Dancing on the Volcano, co-author: Anna Sukmanowska), 1991
- The Polish Geographical Names in Canada, 1992
- The Canadian section of Polish Heritage Travel Guide to USA and Canada, 1992
- Papież jakiego nie znamy (The Pope that we do not know 1994 – I edition, 2005 - II edition and III edition), 1994
- Przepustka do raju (A pass to paradise), 1994
- Gdy wspominam Kaszuby (When I remember Kaszuby), 2000
- Listy do Nieba (Letters to Heaven 2006 - in Polish, 2007 - in English), 2006
- Kaszuby – moja polska kanadyjska (Kaszuby – my Canadian Poland), 2010

In addition to his works, Stanisław Stolarczyk is also the documentary of the Polonia in Canada, and coordinator of the Polish Heritage in Canada Database (www.polishheritage.ca, 2007).
