= 1946 in Poland =

- Decades: 1920s; 1930s; 1940s; 1950s; 1960s
- See also: Other events of 1946; Timeline of Polish history

Events during the year 1946 in Poland.

== Incumbents ==
- President – Bolesław Bierut
- Prime Minister – Edward Osóbka-Morawski

== Events ==
- 4 July – Kielce pogrom: A violent attack by Polish soldiers, police and civilians on the Jewish community in Kielce kills at least 42 people and injures over 40 others.

== Births ==
- 3 April – Hanna Suchocka, politician, President of Poland
- 7 July – Tadeusz Nowicki, tennis player
