= Zofiówka Coal Mine =

Coal mine in Jastrzębie-Zdrój, Poland

Zofiówka coal mine
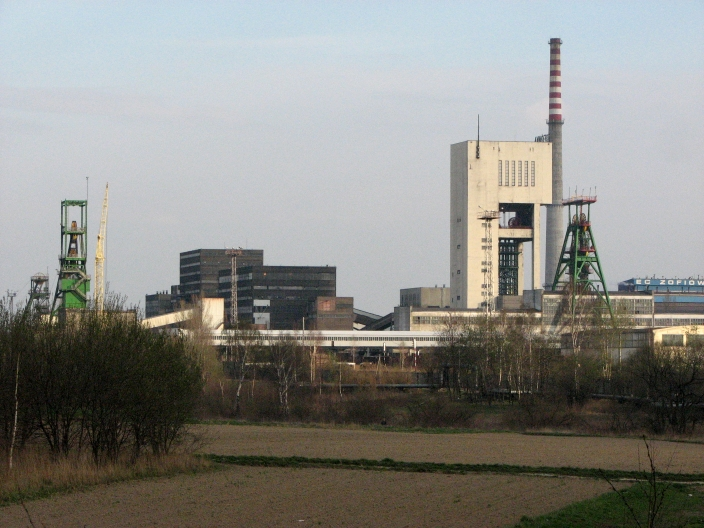
- KWK Zofiówka seen from north

- Location in Poland
- Location: Jastrzębie-Zdrój, Silesian Voivodeship, Poland; 49°58′03″N 018°37′32″E
- Products: Coal
- Production: 3,700,000
- Opened: 1969
- Company: Jastrzębska Spółka Węglowa

The Zofiówka coal mine is a large mine in the south of Poland in Jastrzębie-Zdrój, Silesian Voivodeship, 307 km south-west of the capital, Warsaw. Zofiówka represents one of the largest coal reserve in Poland having estimated reserves of 87 million tonnes of coal. The annual coal production is around 3.7 million tonnes.

== Accidents ==
- 5 miners died on 5 May 2018 due to a rock burst with a coal mine bump following an earthquake of magnitude 3.4.
- 10 miners died on 23 April 2022 due to a rock burst following an earthquake of magnitude 2.7 after an outburst of methane gas occurred.
