= Arnold Fibiger =

Polish entrepreneur

Gustaw Arnold (I) Fibiger (born 16 October 1847 in Kalisz, died 5 February 1915 in Warsaw), was a Polish piano builder, industrialist and founder of the Arnold Fibiger Piano.

Arnold Fibiger's piano company was the largest and popular piano company in Poland at that time. According to a data analysis in 1939, they were 50,000 pianos produced of which 20,000 came from Arnold Fibiger.
