= Grażyna Tyszko =

Polish politician (born 1949)

member of Sejm 2005-2007
- In office 25 September 2005 – 2007

Personal details
- Born: 25 April 1949 (age 76)
- Party: Samoobrona

Grażyna Alicja Tyszko (born 25 April 1949 in Pabianice) is a Polish politician. She was elected to the Sejm on 25 September 2005, receiving 10981 votes in 11 Sieradz district as a candidate in the Samoobrona Rzeczpospolitej Polskiej list.

== See also ==
- Members of Polish Sejm 2005-2007
