= 2005 in Poland =

- Decades: 1980s; 1990s; 2000s; 2010s; 2020s
- See also: Other events of 2005; Timeline of Polish history

Events during the year 2005 in Poland.

== Incumbents ==
Incumbents
Position	Person	Party
President	Aleksander Kwaśniewski; Lech Kaczyński	
Prime Minister	Marek Belka; Kazimierz Marcinkiewicz	
Marshal of the Sejm	Włodzimierz Cimoszewicz	
Marshal of the Senate	Longin Pastusiak; Bogdan Borusewicz	

== Events ==
- 1 July – Lynching at Włodowo
- 9 and 23 October – 2005 Polish presidential election

== Deaths ==
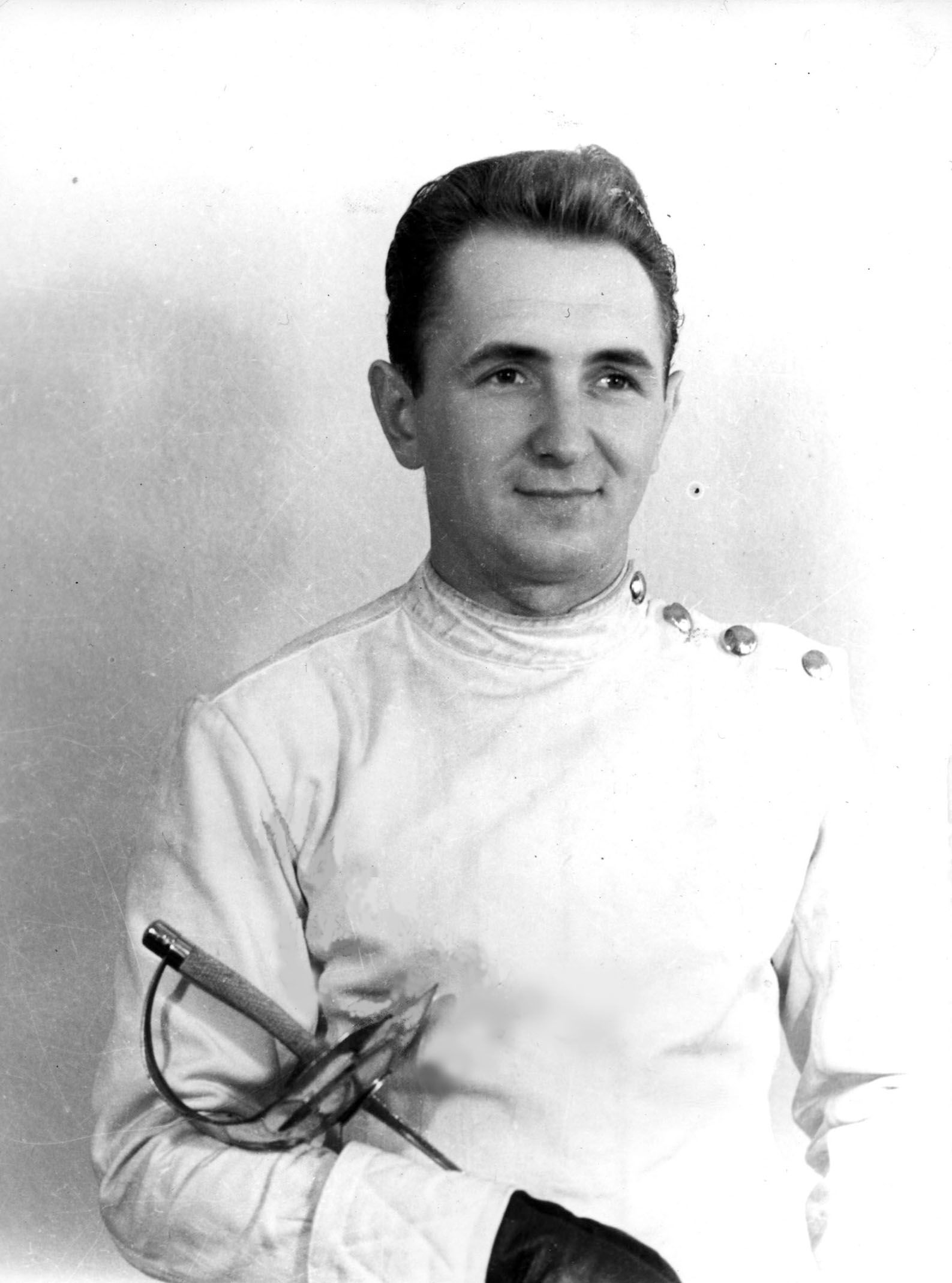
Jerzy Pawłowski won a gold medal in sabre at the 1968 Summer Olympics.

- 11 January – Jerzy Pawłowski, fencer and double agent (born 1932).
- 20 January – Jan Nowak-Jeziorański, journalist, writer, politician and social worker (born 1914)
- 25 January – Stanisław Albinowski, economist (born 1923)
- 21 February – Zdzisław Beksiński painter, photographer and sculptor (born 1929)
- 17 March – Czesław Słania, engraver (born 1921)
- 3 April – Aleksy Antkiewicz, boxer (born 1923).
- 17 April – Marian Sawa, composer (born 1937)
- 12 May – Zdzisław Gierwatowski, footballer (born 1920)
- 14 May – Józef Gąsienica, Nordic combined skier (born 1941).
- 26 May – Krzysztof Nowak, footballer (born 1975)
- 30 May – Tomasz Pacyński, fantasy and science fiction writer (born 1958)
- 26 June – Filip Adwent, politician (born 1955)
- 20 August – Romuald Grabczewski, chess player (born 1932)
- 31 August – Joseph Rotblat, physicist (born 1908)
- 16 September – Arkadiusz Gołaś, volleyball player (born 1981).
- 24 September – Daniel Podrzycki, politician (born 1963)
- 13 October – Marian Zieliński, weightlifter (born 1929).
- 17 November – Marek Perepeczko, actor (born 1942)
