= 2009 in Poland =

- Decades: 1980s; 1990s; 2000s; 2010s; 2020s
- See also: Other events of 2009; Timeline of Polish history

Events during the year 2009 in Poland.

== Incumbents ==
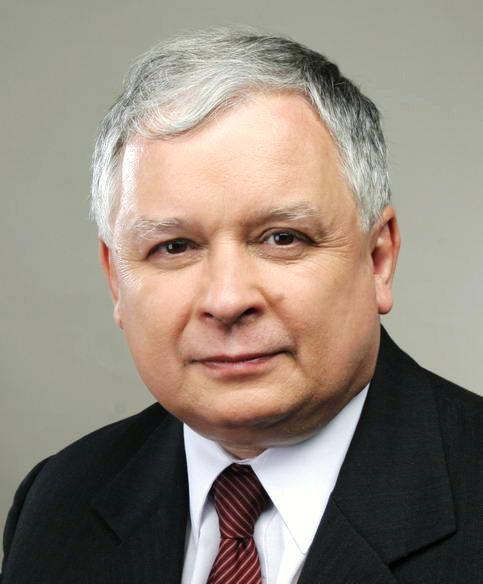
Lech Kaczyński

Incumbents
Position	Person	Party
President	Lech Kaczyński	Independent (Supported by Law and Justice)
Prime Minister	Donald Tusk	Civic Platform
Marshal of the Sejm	Bronisław Komorowski	Civic Platform
Marshal of the Senate	Bogdan Borusewicz	Independent (Supported by the Civic Platform)

== Events ==
=== January ===
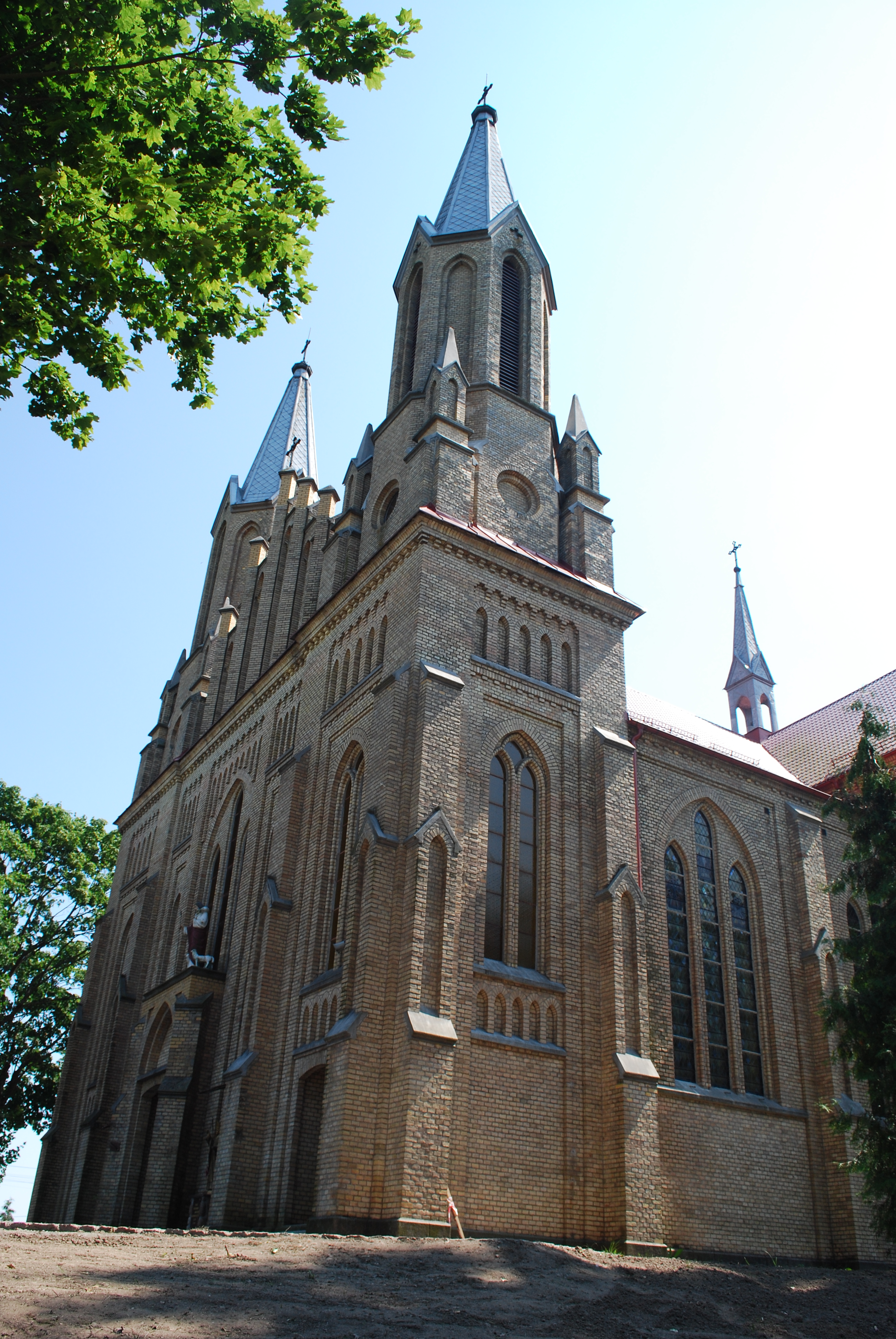
Gothic Revival church in Krynki in 2009

- 1 January – Five localities were granted town rights: Bobowa, Brzostek, Krynki, Michałowo, and Szczucin.

=== February ===
- 17 February – Rescue helicopter Mil Mi-2 of the Polish Medical Air Rescue has crashed in Jarostów; pilot and HCM were killed and the doctor severely injured.
- 27 February – Combat helicopter Mil Mi-24 of the Polish Air Force has crashed in Szadłowice; pilot was killed, two other crew members lightly injured.

=== March ===
- 31 March – An-28 Bryza-2RF transport plane of Polish Air Force has crashed in the Babie Doły district of Gdynia; entire crew (four persons) was killed.

=== April ===
- 6 April – one death and 25 wounded in a train crash near Białogard
- 13 April – Kamień Pomorski homeless hostel fire. 23 deaths. President of Poland declared a 3-day national mourning.

=== May ===
- 5 May – Skra Bełchatów won their fifth Polish Volleyball Championship defeating Resovia in the finals (see 2008–09 PlusLiga).
- 20 May – Asseco Prokom Sopot won their sixth Polish Basketball Championship defeating Turów Zgorzelec in the finals.
- 31 May – last flight of the Polish airline Centralwings

=== June ===
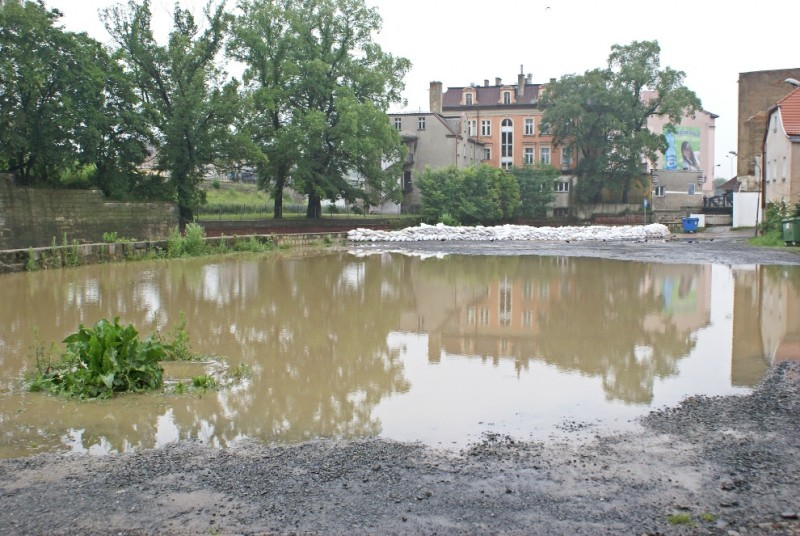
Flood in Kłodzko, June 2009

- Poland hit by 2009 European floods
- 7 June: European Parliament election takes place in Poland.

=== August ===
- 23–30 August – Poznań hosts the 2009 World Rowing Championships.
- 30 August – Su-27 combat plane of Belarusian Air Force crashes during the Radom Air Show 2009; entire crew (two persons) was killed.

=== September ===
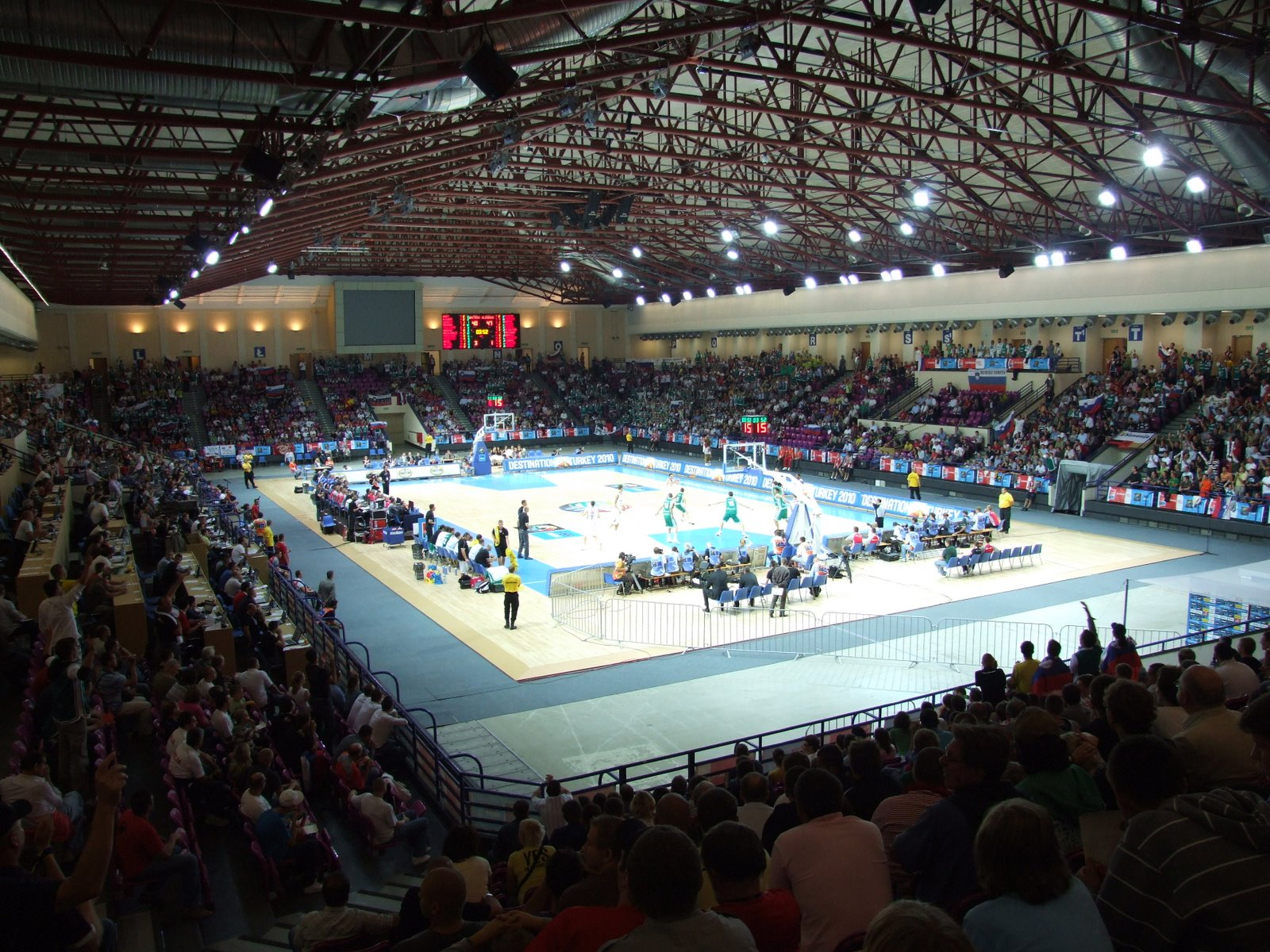
Great Britain v Slovenia match in the EuroBasket 2009 in Warsaw, 7 September 2009

- 7–20 September – Poland hosts the EuroBasket 2009.
- 18 September – 20 deaths and 37 wounded following 2009 Wujek-Śląsk mine blast
- 25 September–4 October – Poland hosts the 2009 Women's European Volleyball Championship.

=== October ===
- 18 October – Falubaz Zielona Góra won their fifth Team Speedway Polish Championship defeating Unibax Toruń in the finals (see 2009 Polish speedway season).

=== December ===
- 18 December – President Lech Kaczyński pardons brothers Tomasz, Mirosław and Krzysztof Winek for their role in the Lynching at Włodowo.

== Deaths ==
=== February ===
- 7 February: Piotr Stańczak, Polish geologist beheaded by Islamic terrorists in Pakistan

== See also ==
- 2009 in Polish television
