= Ignacy Posadzy =

Polish Roman Catholic priest (1898–1984)

Venerable Ignacy Posadzy SChr
- Superior General of the Society of Christ
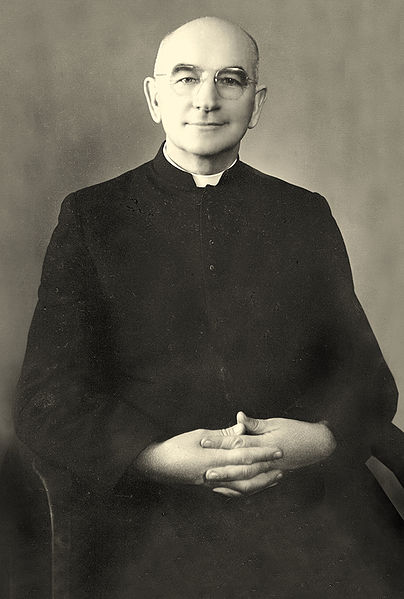
- Installed: 22 August 1932
- Term ended: 5 July 1968
- Predecessor: Post established
- Successor: Florian Berlik

Orders
- Ordination: 19 February 1921 by Wilhelm Kloske

Personal details
- Born: February 17, 1898 Szadłowice, German Empire
- Died: January 17, 1984 (aged 85) Puszczykowo, Polish People's Republic
- Denomination: Catholic

Sainthood
- Venerated in: Roman Catholic Church
- Title as Saint: Venerable

Ordination history
History
Diaconal ordination
- Date: 5 December 1920
Priestly ordination
- Ordained by: Wilhelm Kloske (Gniezno)
- Date: 19 February 1921
- Place: Gniezno Cathedral

Ignacy Posadzy, SChr (February 17, 1898 – January 17, 1984) was a Polish Catholic priest who ministered to Polish migrants from the interwar period through World War II and during the rule of Communist Poland. At the direction of Cardinal August Hlond, he co-founded an order dedicated to serving Polish migrants, the Society of Christ.

He served as superior general of the Society from 1932 to 1968. In 1958, he founded an order of religious sisters, dedicated to serving Polish migrants, the Missionary Sisters of Christ the King. During World War II, he was appointed spiritual leader of Polish slave labourers in Nazi Germany with the permission of Pope Pius XII, Adam Sapieha, the archbishop of Kraków and the leader of the Catholic Church in occupied Poland and the Home Army.

Posadzy's cause for sainthood was opened in 2001 and was declared a venerable by Pope Francis in 2022.

== Early life ==
Ignacy Posadzy was born on February 17, 1898, in Szadłowice, near Inowrocław, to Jakub and Katarzyna (née Pawlak) Posadzy. His parents came from a very religious background and raised their children according. Ignacy was their eighth child and was brought up in a strongly religious and patriotic family environment.

In 1905, when at his primary school in Szadłowice, religion was taught in German instead of Polish, Ignacy started a strike, together with the other children. He participated in the strike with his sister Anna, who was two years his senior. After completing primary school, in 1908, he began attending gymnasium in Inowrocław. Ignacy successfully completed gymnasium despite the difficulties faced by Polish youth, who were required to have much greater knowledge of the German language and other subjects than what was required of German youth. In turn, only a few Poles completed gymnasium and the subsequent final examination. During the partitions of Poland, Polish families taught the Polish language, literature, history and culture secretly at home.

== Seminary ==
In 1917, Posadzy entered the Archbishop's Seminary in Poznań. During World War I, he continued his studies in Münster and Fulda. It was there that Posadzy first encountered the plight of Polish emigrants. He witnessed the struggles of seasonal workers, particularly those from Russian Poland. Polish seasonal workers lived in the immediate vicinity of Münster and Fulda, and he met with these many times. They complained to him about the hard working conditions, especially about the lack of Polish pastoral care. As a seminarian, together with his fellow seminarians, he ministered to those migrants, gave lectures and prayed together with them.

After the war ended, he completed his studies in the seminaries in Gniezno and Poznań. Posadzy was ordained a subdeacon on October 10, 1920. On December 5, 1920, he was ordained a deacon. On February 19, 1921, he was ordained a diocesan priest by Bishop Wilhelm Kloske in the Gniezno Cathedral.

== Early priesthood ==
After ordination, Posadzy worked in parish ministry in Poznań. His preaching and his dedication to hearing confessions were soon noted by his superiors. After three years of work at the Poznań Fara, he was entrusted with the role of prefect at the State Teachers' Seminary in Poznań. He wrote for Catholic periodicals and was active in religious journalism. He became friends with Nikodem Cieszyński, editor of "Rocznik Katolicki" (The Catholic Yearbook). Posadzy also became a co-editor of "Biblioteka Kaznodziejska" (The Preacher's Library) and "Wiadomości dla Duchowieństwa" (News for the Clergy). He was also a member of the Polish Writers' Union.

Following his ordination, Posadzy spent his vacations by travelling abroad and living among Polish emigrants. In 1923, he stayed in Saxony and Bavaria, where he organised services for Polish emigrants on Sundays and holidays. In July 1924, he spent time serving in Hesse. He made another pastoral journey in 1925. In August 1926, on behalf of the State Emigration Office, he left for Denmark. In 1928, he visited Polish communities in Romania. In 1929, sent by August Hlond, Posadzy travelled to Brazil, Uruguay and Argentina to gather information regarding the Polish communities there. The visitation lasted from May to September 1929.

In May 1930, he attended in the International Eucharistic Congress in Carthage.

In 1930, again at the request of Hlond, Posadzy made another journey across the Atlantic to once again visit the Polish migrant communities in Brazil, Argentina, and Uruguay. The second visitation lasted longer than the first, from June 1930 to June 1931.

In 1938, Posadzy published a memoir of his travels to the Polish communities of South America, "The Way of the Pilgrims" (Drogą Pielgrzymów).

== Society of Christ ==
In 1932, Hlond entrusted Posadzy with the establishment of a new religious order, the Society of Christ. Posadzy served as its Superior General until 1968.

=== Foundation ===
In 1930, prior to Posadzy's making his second visitation of the Polish communities in South America, Hlond asked Posadzy to consider leading a new religious order that Hlond was seeking to establish. The order would later come to be known as the Society of Christ. The missionary order would send priests around the world to serve Polish migrants wherever they resided.

Hlond had considered for some time entrusting the spiritual care of the Polish diaspora ministry to a religious congregation. He had come to see that sending diocesan priests for that sort of ministry had borne little fruit. Initially, Hlond had tried to pass the pastoral ministry of Poles in exile to the Resurrectionists or to the Oratorians. Neither proposal came to fruition and so Hlond started to work toward founding a new religious congregation after Pope Pius XI explicitly recommended that such an order be founded.

In response to Hlond's request to lead the new religious order, Posadzy initially replied that his health was poor and that he lacked the organisational skills for such an undertaking. Posadzy requested a few days to consider Hlon's proposal. The next day, however, Posadzy told Hlond that he was ready to undertake the task of organizing the new order. After his conversation with Hlond, Posadzy went to Dukla Forest, where, in the Hermitage of St. John of Dukla, he made a private 10-day retreat.

After the retreat, Posadzy began promoting the mission of the emerging congregation. He organized lectures during which he reflected on his last trip to the Polish communities of South America. During the lectures, he displayed his own pictures depicting the life of Polish emigrants in South America. In Poznań, he gave a lecture at the "Słońce" cinema, which had the largest auditorium in the capital of Greater Poland. Hlond was present at the lecture.

At the behest of Cardinal Hlond, Posadzy went to Bad Godesberg, in Germany, where in 1927, Bishop Franz Xaver Geyer founded a congregation for German migrants: "Gemeinschaft von den heiligen Engeln" (Congregation of the Holy Angels). Then Posadzy went to Italy to learn about the Scalabrinian order founded by Bishop Giovanni Scalabrini for the pastoral care of the Italian migrants. By the end of March 1932, Posadzy returned to Poznań. After returning to Poland, Posadzy continued to promote the new order by giving lectures and writing articles for the press.

On August 22, 1932, Hlond gave his blessing for Posadzy to begin the work of organizing the new order in earnest. Along with this blessing, the Cardinal gave Posadzy final instructions and a few fatherly words of encouragement saying:

So we begin In Nomine Domini. Let us trust God - He will surely help us.

The next day, August 23, Posadzy travelled to Potulice, where Countess Aniela Potulicka had donated her mansion and surrounding grounds to serve as the mother house of the new order, the Society of Christ.

==== Potulice ====
A few days after Posadzy had arrived in Potulice, 20 candidates for the priesthood and 16 aspirants for religious brothers arrived. On October 15, 1932, the canonical novitiate began in Potulice. On November 4, 1932, Posadzy enthroned the Sacred Heart of Jesus in the novitiate. Devotion to the Sacred Heart of Jesus was a central part of Posadzy's upbringing. In the main room of his family home was a large statue of the Sacred Heart of Jesus. The whole family often prayed at the foot of the statue. It was with his background that Posadzy, from the very beginning of the Society, emphasized the devotion to the Sacred Heart of Jesus for all members of the Society of Christ. Life in Potulice was marked by intensive spiritual and pastoral activity, in which Posadzy played a leading role. Posadzy followed the directives given to him by Hlond. Posadzy also sought the help and advise of the nearby Pallottine priests in Suchary, as well as the number of priests like Aleksander Żychliński.

Posadzy became friends with Maximilian Kolbe. Inspired by Kolbe's Niepokalanów, Posadzy established a publishing house, a printing house and a number of mechanical and craft workshops in Potulice. The Society began issuing the following magazines: "Głos Seminarium Zagranicznego" (Voice of the International Seminary), "Msza Święta" (Holy Mass), "Cześć Świętych Polskich" (Veneration of Polish Saints). Many books were published by the Society's prewar publishing house, based in Potulice. Members of the Society distributed the Society's publications all over Poland to promote the Society's mission and charism.

While establishing the Society's operations in Poland, Posadzy also maintained contact with Polish communities abroad and travelled to them regularly. As such, Posadzy maintained contact with Polish communities around the world. In the years prior to World War II, Posadzy travelled to various Polish communities around the world. In 1937, he travelled to the Far East to attended the 33rd International Eucharistic Congress in Manila. On the way to the Congress, he travelled through India, where he was hosted by Mahatma Gandhi. During their meeting, the two held a philosophical-religious discussion regarding Truth. This discussion was documented in Posadzy's book, Przez Tajemniczy Wschód ("Through the Mysterious East"). Returning from the Philippines, Posadzy returned to Poland travelling through China, Japan, Korea, Manchukuo and the Soviet Union.

At the end of June 1939, Posadzy travelled to Denmark for the Polish Youth Congress and to Metz, where the Catholic Congress of Poles from eastern France was being held. After the Congress, he toured Polish pastoral centres. While in Lyon, he made a pilgrimage to the Basilica of the Sacred Heart of Paray-le-Monial. On his way back, he visited London, where religious brothers had been working for a year in the Polish Catholic mission.

=== World War II ===
When, in September 1939, World War II broke out, the Society of Christ already had 20 priests, 86 seminarians and about 200 brothers and postulants. As a Polish Catholic organisation, the Society attracted the attention of the Nazi German authorities and its activities were restricted. Therefore, during their invasion of Poland, Posadzy ordered the evacuation of the Society's mother house in Potulice. During the Nazi occupation, Ignacy kept in touch members of the Society and organized new opportunities for pastoral work for the Society's priests.

In 1942, the priests of the Society managed to obtain a permit from the German authorities in Kraków for pastoral work in the so-called dulagach, transit camps for Poles deported to Germany for forced labour. Eventually, all transit camps in the General Government received chaplains, mainly from among the Society's priests. The work was associated with great danger and, in several cases, ended with arrest and imprisonment in Dachau concentration camp.

Posadzy sought opportunities for the Society's seminarians to complete their seminary studies at the seminaries of other religious orders or dioceses. He directed clerics to Kraków to continue their theological studies. During this time, 43 clerics were ordained priests.

Posadzy took care of seminarians and organized their ordinations. He also conducted many retreats for nuns. He organized an eight-day retreat for priests of the Society in Kalwaria Zebrzydowska each year, despite the restrictions imposed by the occupation.

=== Communist Poland ===
After the war, the activities of Posadzy and of the Society continued under the conditions of communist rule in Poland. At the request of Hlond, its founder, Posadzy directed the Society's priests to the West Pomeranian Voivodeship for pastoral work in the region's parishes. Posadzy regularly visited the parishes and encouraged the priests working there, who often faced limited resources and administrative obstacles. He delivered numerous conferences on the priesthood, and the texts of these conferences have been preserved. He delivered many of these conferences during priestly retreats.

Posadzy focused on preparing new priests. He oversaw the reopening of the Society's novitiate immediately after the war. A few years later, a minor seminary was opened, followed by a major seminary.

Posadzy relaunched the Society's publishing house and restarted to issue its monthly magazine, Msza Święta (Holy Mass), after the wartime disruption.

When it was possible to obtain a passport for travel, Posadzy travelled to Rome and had an audience with Pope Pius XII to discuss the future of the Society. The Pope encouraged Posadzy to continue his work and granted an apostolic blessing.

Posadzy, like other Catholic leaders in communist Poland, worked under a political system that imposed significant restrictions on the Church. The communist authorities subjected the Society of Christ to various controls and limitations on its activities. In response, Posadzy attempted to continue the Society's mission within the constraints imposed by the authorities. When the director of the communist Office for Religious Affairs came to bestow Posadzy with a honorific distinction for supposed contributions to the Polish People's Republic, Posadzy took the order, returned it to the bureaucrat and placed it in the director's coat pocket. Posadzy refused to be associated with the Polish United Workers' Party or to accept state distinctions, distancing himself from the government’s policies toward the Catholic Church.

When, in 1958, he founded the Missionary Sisters of Christ the King, he registered the community with the authorities as an extension of a Felician convent at a time when new religious congregations could not be officially founded. In 1950 the Society of Christ, founded by Posadzy and Cardinal Hlond, received a decretum laudis (decree of praise) from the Holy See. In 1951, the General Chapter of the Society of Christ bestowed upon him the title of co-founder of the Society. Final approval of the Society of Christ was granted by the Holy See in 1964. Posadzy met with Pope Paul VI around this time. Soon afterward, in 1968, Posadzy retired from his role as Superior General of the Society of Christ.

== Missionary Sisters of Christ the King ==
In 1958, following a suggestion that Cardinal Hlond had once given to him, he founded another religious order, the Missionary Sisters of Christ the King. The founding decree was signed on November 21, 1959, by the Archbishop of Poznań, Antoni Baraniak. The Missionary Sisters continue to serve Polish migrants around the world.

== Later years ==
In 1968, after 36 years as Superior General of the Society of Christ, Posadzy retired from the office and continued to live in the community, where he remained involved in its spiritual life. In the last years of his life, he focused on prayer and meditation within the Society’s community.

In 1971, during Posadzy's golden jubilee of priesthood, Cardinal Stefan Wyszyński celebrated a Mass in Poznań Cathedral. During his homily, he said of Posadzy:

We can thank God that you understood your priesthood in such a way that it carried you across seas and lands to serve the People of God with a living word and bestow upon those people the power of the Holy Sacraments. You preached God's teaching, not your own. Teachings that were derived from Christ's sacrifice on the cross. This is how you understood your priesthood and this is how you fulfilled it.

== Death and burial ==
Posadzy died on January 17, 1984, in Puszczykowo. He was buried at the Society of Christ's burial plot at the Miłostowo Cemetery, in Poznań. Pope John Paul II, hearing about the death of Posadzy, sent a telegram to the Society of Christ:

After the death of Father Ignacy Posadzy, co-founder of the Society of Christ and founder of the Missionary Sisters of Christ the King, I mourn and pray with the orphaned congregations and, on the hands of the Superior General of the Society, I express my sympathy. Together with you, I thank Almighty God for the long life and work of a man whose character was shaped by grace and who served as a minister of grace. A man who is deeply inscribed in the contemporary history of the Church in Poland, a man of faith, contemplation and service--a Man of God. With Christ, the Eternal Priest, he drew upon God's power to carry out his ministry in order to build up the Body of Christ (Eph 4:12). Let us pray that our savior accepts his servant to the joy of heaven. Let us pray too that the legacy of this servant continue to grow and develop through his spiritual sons and daughters. From the depths of my heart, I bless both Congregations, the family and friends of Fr. Posadzy, as well as those who attend his funeral.

John Paul II, Pope.

The Vatican, January 21, 1984.

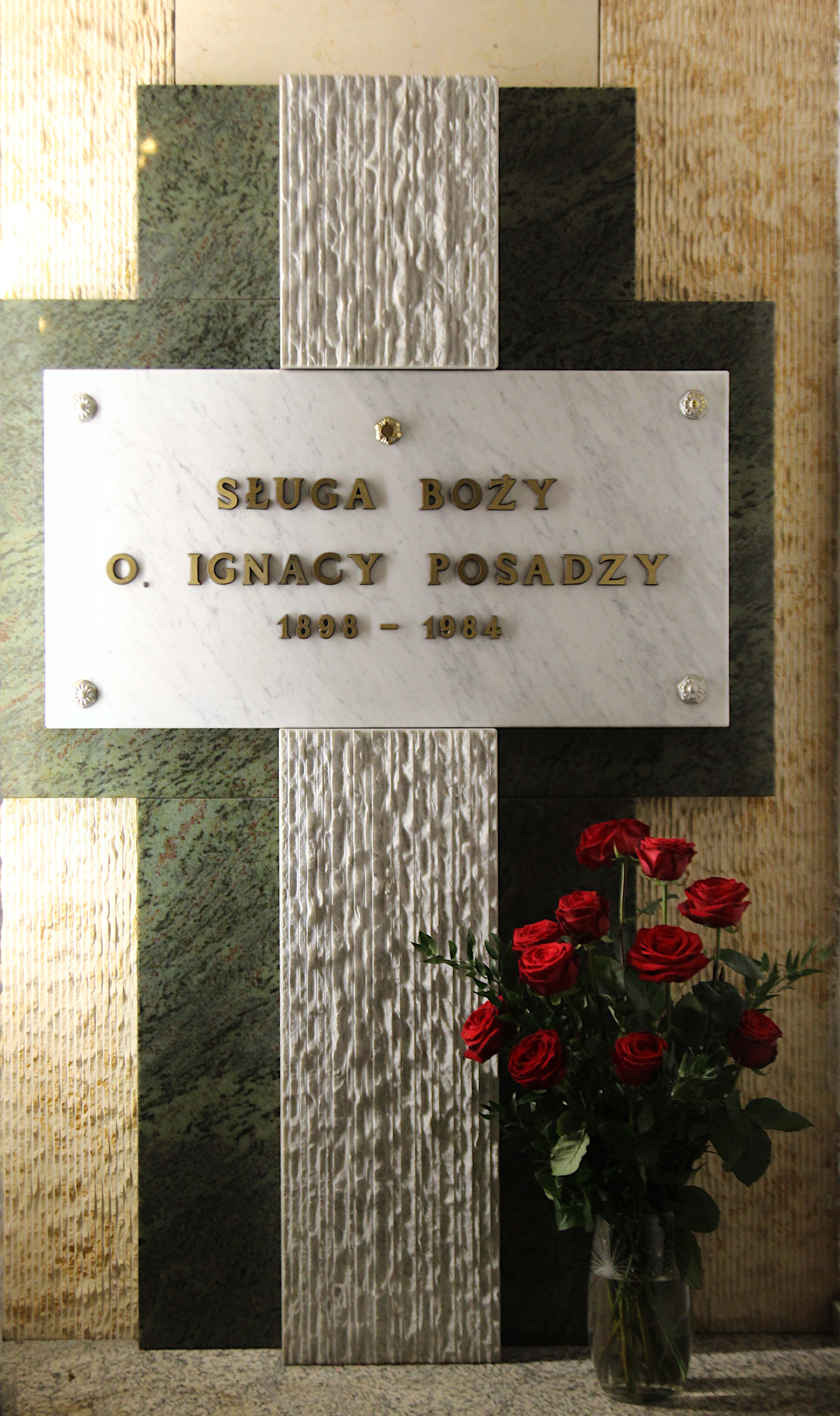
Posadzy's current resting place.

In 2007, his body was exhumed as part of the cause for his beatification. His remains are now interred in a chapel at the Society of Christ's headquarters in Poznań.

== Cause for beatification ==
On June 16, 1999, in a letter to the Archbishop of Poznań, the Superior General of the Society of Christ, Tadeusz Winnicki, formally requested that a cause for the beatification of Posadzy be opened. On May 23, 2000, the Congregation for the Causes of Saints issued a nihil obstat granting its permission for the cause to proceed. On January 17, 2001, a ceremony in Poznań Cathedral marked the beginning of the beatification process on the diocesan level during which evidence of Posadzy's heroic virtue would be gathered. On January 12, 2007, Posadzy's earthy remains were exhumated and identified. They were interred later in a chapel at the headquarters of the Society of Christ.

On May 6, 2009, the diocesan investigation was completed, and a report was prepared for submission to the Congregation for the Causes of Saints. On June 19, 2009, the report and its related documents were submitted to the Congregation. On September 3, 2009, the Congregation issued a decree allowing the cause to proceed to its next phase in Rome. On November 23, 2009, the Holy See began its review of the submitted report. After reviewing the report, the Congregation issued a decree validating the diocesan investigation and granting Posadzy the title of Servant of God.

On June 21, 2018, the Positio super vita, virtutibus et fama sanctitatis was submitted to the Congregation for review. The Positio was reviewed by the Congregation's Theological Commission on November 30, 2021. On December 1, 2021, the Theological Commission announced that it had judged the Positio "positively" and concurred with the Positio's assertion of Posadzy's heroic virtue. The Positio was positively reviewed by a commission of Cardinals and Bishops on December 13, 2022. The cause was then presented for approval to Pope Francis, who on December 17, 2022, recognized Posadzy's heroic virtue and declared Posadzy Venerable.
