= Missionary Sisters of Christ the King =

Religious group

- Congregatio Sororum Missionariarum Christi Regis pro Polonis Emigrantibus (Latin)
- Misjonarki Chrystusa Króla dla Polonii Zagranicznej (Polish)
- Abbreviation: MChr
- Formation: November 21, 1959; 65 years ago
- Founder: Servant of God Ignacy Posadzy
- Headquarters: Morasko, Poland
- Website: Official website

The Congregation of the Missionary Sisters of Christ the King for the Polish Diaspora Abroad (MChr) (Latin: Congregatio Sororum Missionariarum Christi Regis pro Polonis Emigrantibus) - grew out of the spiritual and cultural needs of Polish emigrants. It was founded in 1959 by the Servant of God, Father Ignacy Posadzy, priest of the Society of Christ (exact date of establishment - November 21, 1959; approval under papal rights - November 24, 1996).

The vocation of each missionary is boundless love for the cause of God among the Polish diaspora abroad and the desire for self-sacrifice and joyful sacrifice of strength, comfort and life for the good of the Polish diaspora.

The sisters live in a community whose inner motto is Paul's exclamation: "May only Christ be proclaimed" (Phil 1:18). At the center of their lives is Christ, reigning from the throne of the cross. Together with their immigrant brothers, they share the joys, sorrows and longings of everyday life. In a foreign land, missionary sisters want to strengthen their faith and build a scrap of their beloved homeland by spreading the cult of the Eucharist, catechesis, and nurturing Polish culture, tradition and language.
