= 2003 in Poland =

- Decades: 1980s; 1990s; 2000s; 2010s; 2020s
- See also: Other events of 2003; Timeline of Polish history

Events during the year 2003 in Poland.

== Incumbents ==
- President: Aleksander Kwaśniewski
- Prime Minister: Leszek Miller

== Events ==
- 8 June – A referendum takes place on Poland joining the European Union with an approval of 77.6% of the vote.

== Births ==
- 24 August – Julia Szeremeta, boxer

== Deaths ==
- 8 March – Stanisław Fołtyn, footballer (born 1936)
- 20 May – Zbigniew Gawior, luger (born 1946)
