= 2010 in Poland =

- Decades: 1990s; 2000s; 2010s; 2020s
- See also: Other events of 2010; Timeline of Polish history

Events during the year 2010 in Poland.

== Incumbents ==
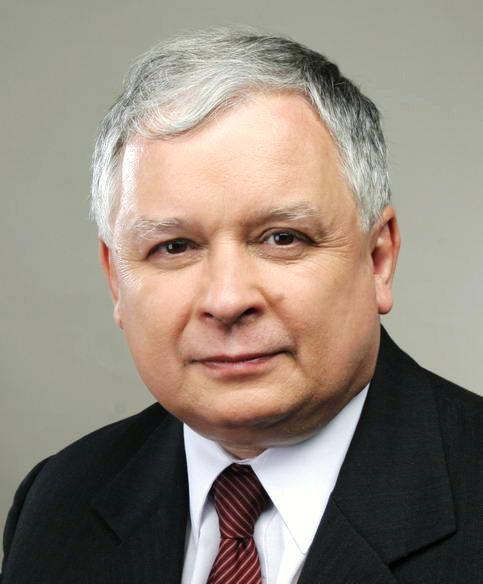
Lech Kaczyński

Incumbents
Position	Person	Party	Notes
President	Lech Kaczyński	Independent (Supported by the Law and Justice)	Until 10 April 2010
President	Bronisław Komorowski	Civic Platform	10 April 2010 - 8 July 2010 (Acting)
President	Bogdan Borusewicz	Independent (Supported by the Civic Platform)	8 July 2010 only (Acting)
President	Grzegorz Schetyna	Civic Platform	8 July 2010 - 6 August 2010 (Acting)
President	Bronisław Komorowski	Independent (Supported by the Civic Platform)	From 6 August 2010
Prime Minister	Donald Tusk	Civic Platform	
Marshal of the Sejm	Bronisław Komorowski	Civic Platform	Until 8 July 2010
Marshal of the Sejm	Stefan Niesiołowski	Civic Platform	8 July 2010 only (Acting)
Marshal of the Sejm	Grzegorz Schetyna	Civic Platform	From 8 July 2010
Marshal of the Senate	Bogdan Borusewicz	Independent (Supported by the Civic Platform)	

=== Elections ===
2010 Polish presidential election
Candidate	Party	First round		Second round	
Candidate	Party	Popular vote	Percentage	Popular vote	Percentage
Bronisław Komorowski	Civic Platform	6,981,319	41.54%	8,933,887	53.01%
Jarosław Kaczyński	Law and Justice	6,128,255	36.46%	7,919,134	46.99%
Grzegorz Napieralski	Democratic Left Alliance	2,299,870	13.68%		
Janusz Korwin-Mikke	Freedom and Lawfulness	416,898	2.48%		
Waldemar Pawlak	Polish People's Party	294,273	1.75%		
Andrzej Olechowski		242,439	1.44%		
Marek Jurek	Right of the Republic	177,315	1.06%		
Bogusław Ziętek	Free Trade Union "August 80"	29,548	0.18%		
Kornel Morawiecki	Fighting Solidarity	21,596	0.13%		
Total and turnout		16,806,170	54.94%	16,853,021	55.31%

== Events ==
=== January ===
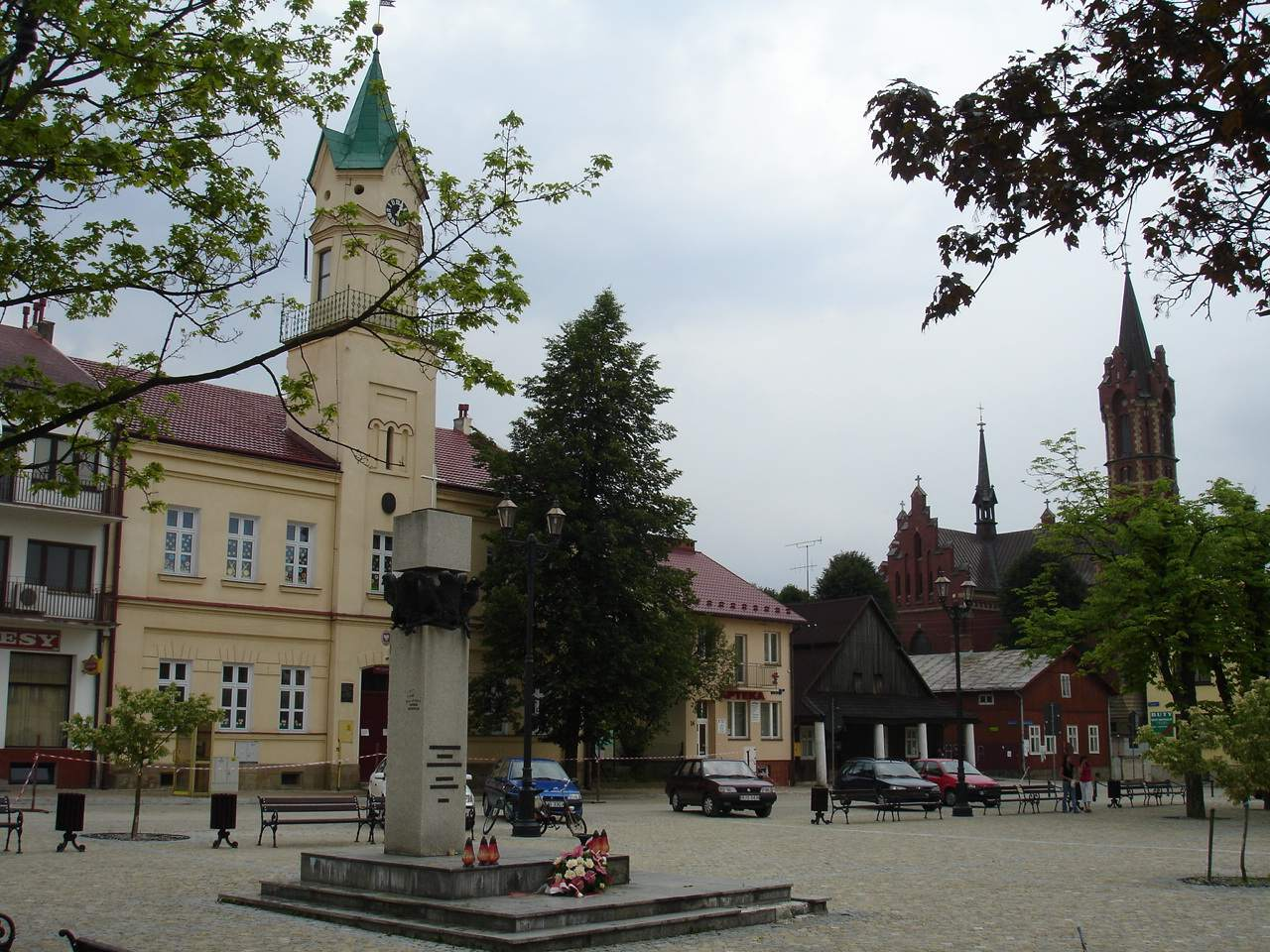
Town square of Kołaczyce

- 1 January – 6 locations: Tychowo, Szepietowo, Łaszczów, Radłów, Kołaczyce, Przecław received city rights.
- 10 January – 18th Final of The Great Orchestra of Christmas Charity (for the second time for children with oncological diseases), oncology clinics for retrofitting the highly specialized equipment.
- 17 January – Referendum on the appeal of:
  - The president of Łódź - The inhabitants decided to remove from office Jerzy Kropiwnicki before the expiry of his term.
  - The mayor of Brwinów - The residents decided to remove Andrzej Guzik from his position 10 months before the expiry of his term, as required, but the mayor is not canceled.

=== February ===
- 10–11 February – In the Atlas Arena in Łódź 2 Depeche Mode concerts were held in exchange for the canceled concert in Warsaw.
- 14 February – Marcin Mroziński won the Polish preselection for the Eurovision Song Contest 2010 and represented Poland at the Eurovision Song Contest 2010.

=== March ===
- 12 March – VIII Gniezno Convention and Rammstein concert in the Łódź Atlas Arena.

=== April ===
- 10 April – In the Smolensk oblast in Russia the Polish presidential plane crashed with President Lech Kaczyński and his wife Maria and 94 other people on board. They were all killed.
  - According to the Constitution of Poland, the Sejm Marshal becomes Acting President of the Republic of Poland.
  - A week of national mourning was introduced, later extended to 9 days.

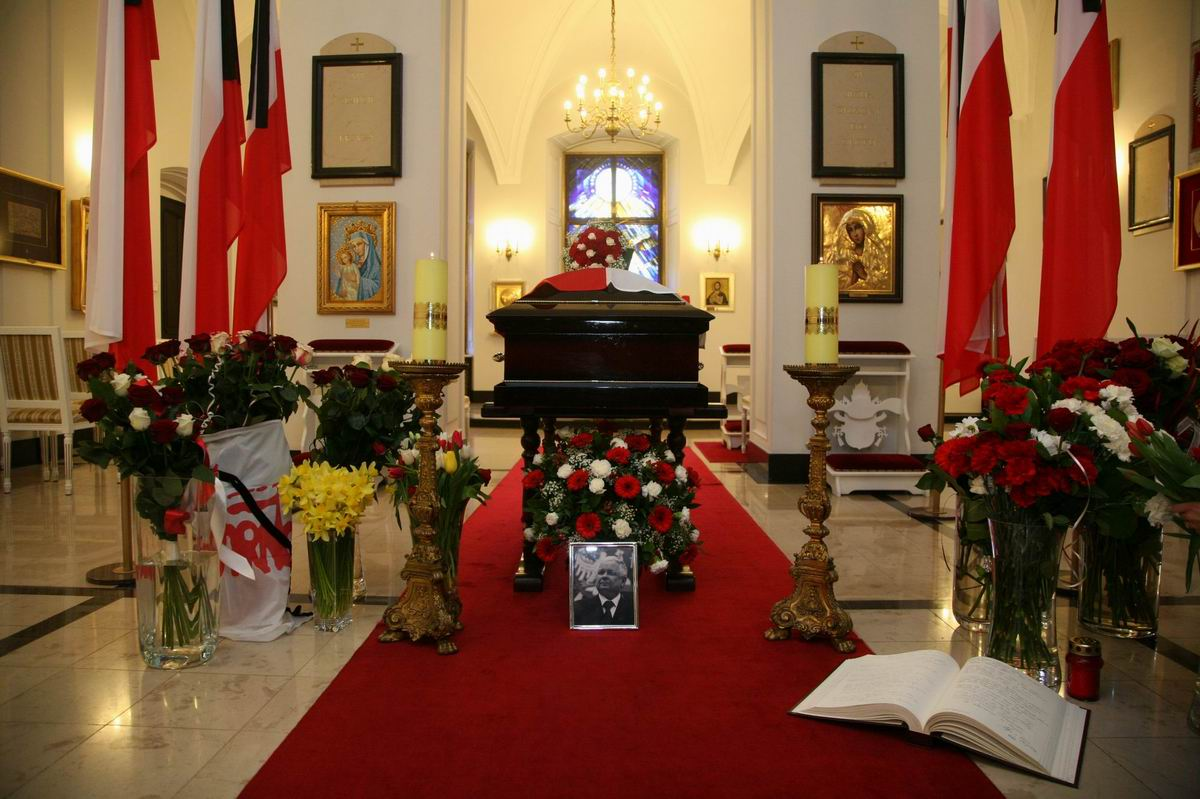
Coffin of Lech Kaczyński in the Presidential Palace's chapel

- 11 April – At the military airport Warsaw-Okecie an aircraft landed with the body of the late President Lech Kaczyński. The coffin was transported to the Presidential Palace. On the route of the procession crowds reflected the honour of deceased countryman.
- 15 April – The Presidential Palace cross a wooden Cross is erected as a memorial to the 96 casualties of the 2010 Polish Air Force Tu-154 crash.
- 17 April – The Warsaw farewell ceremony were held in honour of the victims of a plane crash near Smolensk.
- 18 April – In Kraków, the funeral of the presidential couple, Lech and Maria Kaczyński took place.
- 29 April – The highest win in the Lotto was won in Elbląg and totalled 24 636 124.00 PLN.
- 30 April – The Department of Computer Science of PKP turned off the last operating system in Poland based on a computer teleprocessing 1305th Oder.

=== May ===
- 7 May – Gen. Mieczyslaw Cieniuch became chief of General Staff.
- 11 May
  - Polish thirteen-year-old astronomy lover Rafał Reszelewski discovers Sungrazing Comets Kreutz group comet as the youngest in the project.
  - Skra Bełchatów won their sixth Polish Volleyball Championship defeating Jastrzębski Węgiel in the finals (see 2009–10 PlusLiga).
- 12 May – PZU shares debuted on the Warsaw stock exchange.
- 15 May – Lech Poznań became the Polish soccer Champion.
- 16 May – Rapid flooding of rivers in the basin of upper Odra and Vistula rivers gave rise to the great flood, which covered the whole southern Poland.
- 22 May – The sarcophagus with the remains of Nicolaus Copernicus were solemnly buried in the Basilica Cathedral in Frombork.
- 26 May – The flood wave, after reaching the Baltic Sea finished the first stage of flooding.
- 27 May – Concert of AC/DC in Warsaw Bemowo Airport.
- 29 May – Asseco Prokom Gdynia won their seventh Polish Basketball Championship defeating Anwil Włocławek in the finals.
- 30 May – Elton John's concert at the stadium in Warsaw Polonia.

=== June ===
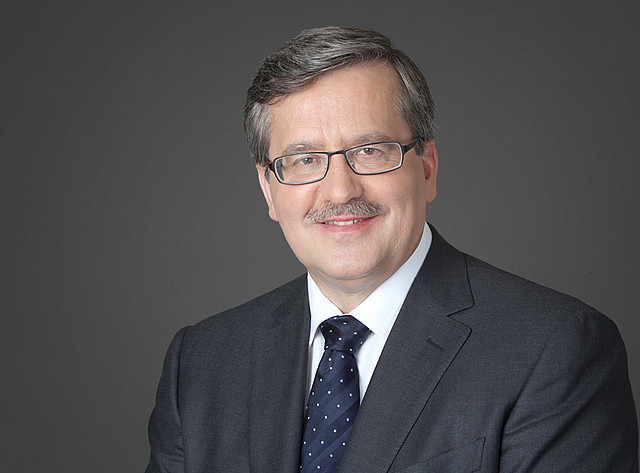
Bronisław Komorowski

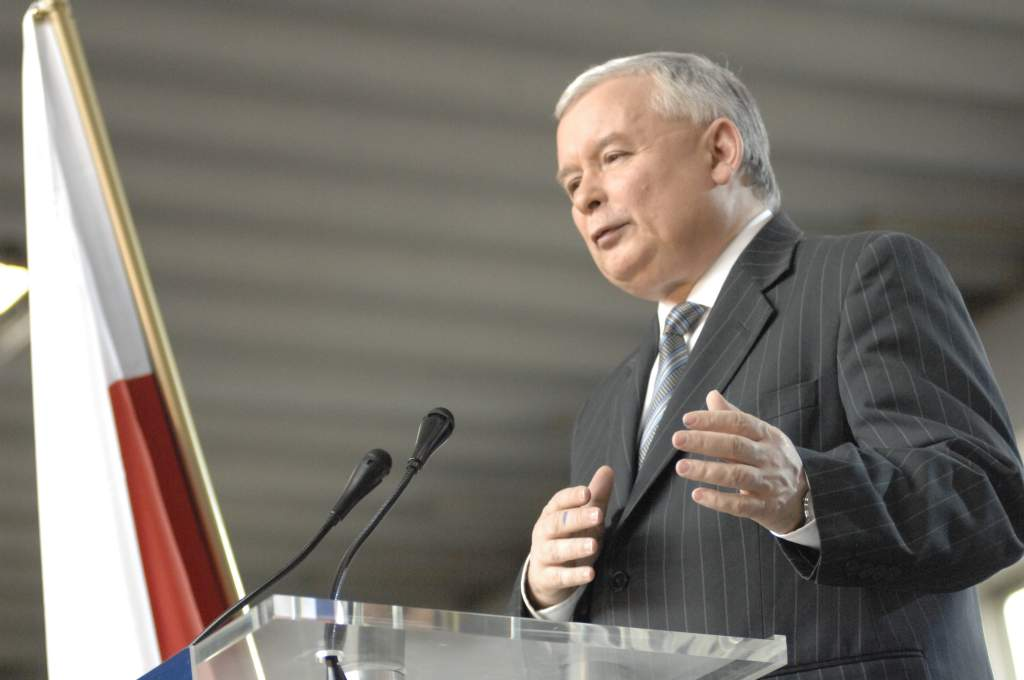
Jarosław Kaczyński

- 1 June – The transcripts of the recordings of the black boxes of the Polish aircraft Tu-154M No. 101, which crashed in Smolensk were published.
- 2 June – The beginning of the second stage of flooding.
- 6 June – Fr. Jerzy Popiełuszko became beatified on Marshal Jozef Pilsudski Sq. in Warsaw.
- 10 June – Irena Lipowicz was appointed by the Sejm for the office of the ombudsman.
- 11 June:
  - Marek Belka, was sworn in as President of the NBP.
  - On an Opole parking lot the corpse of Dariusz Ratajczak has been found.
- 16 June – Concert of the Big Four of thrash metal in the Sonisphere festival in Warsaw, at the airport Bemowo.
- 20 June:
  - The first round of presidential elections. No candidate received a minimum of half of the votes. To the second round of the elections went Bronisław Komorowski and Jarosław Kaczyński.
  - The consecration took place of Bishop Peter Bernard Marie Kubicki in Płock.
- 26 June – Abp. Henryk Muszynski introduces the new Primate - Józef Kowalczyk, on archbishops of Gniezno cathedral.

=== July ===
- 2–4 July – A conference was held in Kraków to celebrate the 10th anniversary of the Community of Democracies. The conference was attended by many foreign politicians, including the head of the European parliament, Jerzy Buzek, and U.S. Secretary of State, Hillary Clinton.
- 3 July – Poland and the U.S. signed an annex to the agreement in Kraków on missile defense.
- 4 July:
  - Second round of presidential elections. Bronisław Komorowski, was elected President of the Republic of Poland.
  - re-enactment of the Battle of Klushino - Feast Day of Glory hussars and Polish Arms - Warsaw.
- 8 July – President-elect Bronislaw Komorowski gave up his parliamentary mandates and functions of the Marshal of the Sejm, and thus ceased to perform the duties of the President, which, for a few hours filled the Marshal of the Senate, Bogdan Borusewicz, and in the evening under the Constitution of the head of state newly elected Marshal of the Sejm Grzegorz Schetyna. In one day, Poland had three politicians taking over the officiating president.
- 15 July – Celebration of the 600th anniversary of the Battle of Grunwald.
- 17 July:
  - Re-enactment of the Battle of Grunwald in celebration of its 600th anniversary.
  - European equality Europride parade - Warsaw.
- 25–31 July – Hockey Championships in the Grass Juniors U-21 - Siemianowice Slaskie.

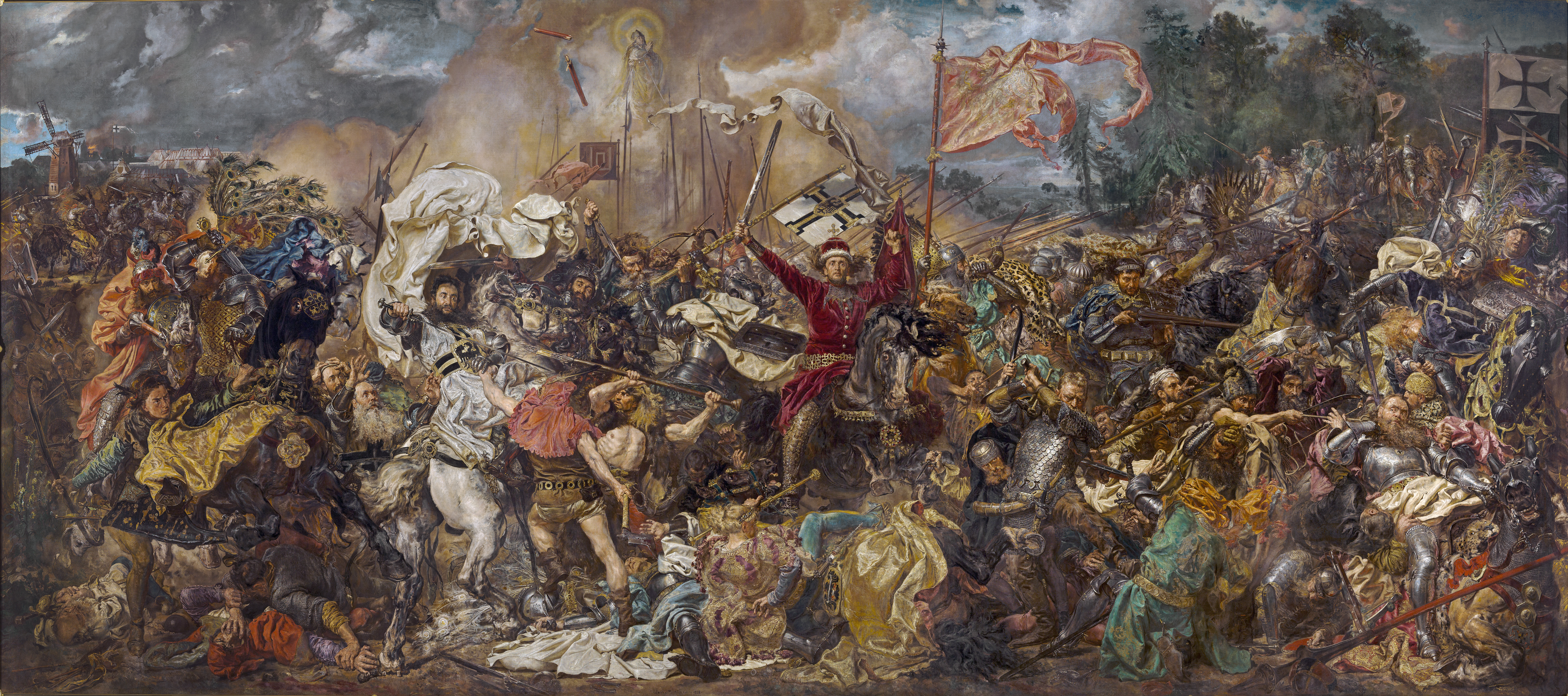
Battle of Grunwald by Jan Matejko.

=== August ===
- 6 August – Inauguration of Bronisław Komorowski for the President of the Republic of Poland.
- 7 August – Bogatynia was flooded by the river flowing through the town, named Miedzianka.
- 9–10 August – A night happening against the presence of the cross of Smolensk before the Presidential Palace in Warsaw.
- 16 August:
  - The jubilee rally on the occasion of the 100th anniversary of scouting in Poland began in Kraków. The inauguration of the rally, held on 17 August, attended by Prime Minister Donald Tusk - the honorary patron of the rally.
  - Beginning of construction of the second line of the Warsaw metro.
- 18 August – The hall opened in Gdańsk-Sopot.

=== September ===
- 16 September – The cross, erected by the Scouts in time of national mourning after the Polish Air Force Tu-154 crash before the Presidential Palace in Warsaw disappears.
- 20 September – Completion of the Municipal Stadium in Poznań.
- 24 September:
  - The Sejm appointed 6 January (Epiphany), again a public holiday.
  - Kraków: An underground museum opened beneath the Market Square. The exhibition, entitled "Traces of the European identity of Krakow" is a multimedia spectacle, a journey in time. Visitors can not only see but also touch the history of the origins of the legendary city.
- 25 September – Wrocław held the second Equality March.
- 26 September – Unia Leszno won their 13th Team Speedway Polish Championship defeating Falubaz Zielona Góra in the finals (see 2010 Polish speedway season).

=== October ===
- 2 October – The National Philharmonic in Warsaw began the sixteenth International Piano Competition named after Frédéric Chopin.
- 12 October – 18 people were killed in a bus collision with a truck at the New Town Pilica.
- 19 October – Mark Rosiak was murdered.

=== November ===
- 5 November – The Copernicus Science Centre in Warsaw was officially opened.
- 6 November – Start of the TV channel Fox Poland.
- 6 November – Christ the King (Polish: Pomnik Chrystusa Króla) a colossal statue of Jesus Christ in Świebodzin, Poland is completed.
- 8 November – As a result of a collision of freight trains in Białystok, a huge fire broke out and the explosion of fuel tanks took place.
- 12 November – Terms of office of local government bodies, elected in local elections in November 2006, expire under the law.
- 21 November – The first round of local elections took place.

=== December ===
- 2 December – Bohdan Zdziennicki's term expires as President of the Constitutional Court.

== Deaths ==
=== January ===
- 3 January:
  - Janusz Atlas, Polish sports journalist (b. 1949)
  - Artur Zirajewski, Polish criminal, contract killer, murder witness of Mark Papał (b. 1972)
- 4 January:
  - Jarosław Giszka, Polish footballer (b. 1965)
  - Tadeusz Góra, Polish Brigadier General, Polish Army pilot, glider (b. 1918)
- 8 January:
  - Stanisław Szwarc-Bronikowski, Polish journalist, explorer and filmmaker (b. 1917)
  - Marian Terlecki, Polish film director and producer (b. 1954)
- 10 January – Krzysztof Kowalczyk, Polish volleyball player, coach (b. 1968)
- 26 January – Juliusz Bardach, Polish lawyer, historian of the system (b. 1914)
- 27 January – Stanisław Michalik, Polish actor (b. 1927)
- 28 January – Kazimierz Mijal, Polish politician (b. 1910)

=== April ===
- 10 April – Lech Kaczyński, President of Poland, his wife Maria Kaczyńska and 94 other people

== See also ==
- 2010 in Polish television
