= 2006 in Poland =

- Decades: 1980s; 1990s; 2000s; 2010s; 2020s
- See also: Other events of 2006; Timeline of Polish history

This is a list of events during the year 2006 in Poland.

== Incumbents ==
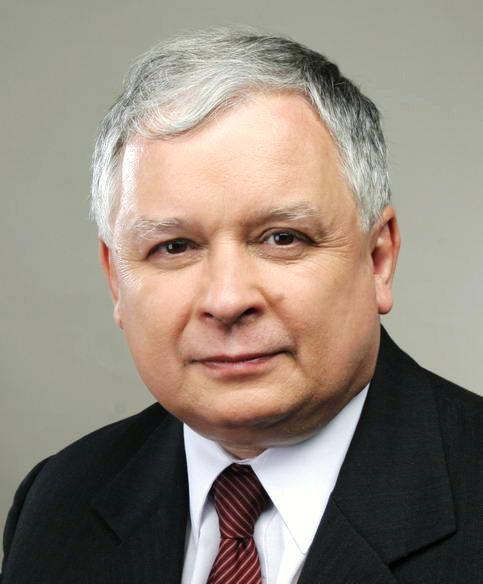
Lech Kaczyński

Incumbents
Position	Person	Party	Notes
President	Lech Kaczyński	Independent (Supported by the Law and Justice)	
Prime Minister	Kazimierz Marcinkiewicz	Law and Justice	Until 16 July 2006
Prime Minister	Jarosław Kaczyński	Law and Justice	From 16 July 2006
Marshal of the Sejm	Marek Jurek	Law and Justice/Right of the Republic	
Marshal of the Senate	Bogdan Borusewicz	Independent (Supported by Law and Justice)	

== Events ==
=== January ===
- 1 January – Town rights of Rzgów and Zakliczyn were restored.
- 28 January – Katowice Trade Hall roof collapse. 65 fatalities, over 170 wounded.

=== April ===
- 23 April – Skra Bełchatów won their second Polish Volleyball Championship defeating Jastrzębski Węgiel in the finals (see 2005–06 Polish Volleyball League).

=== May ===
- 19 May – Prokom Trefl Sopot won their third Polish Basketball Championship defeating Anwil Włocławek in the finals.

=== July ===
- 24 July – The CBA begins its operations.
- 28 July – President Lech Kaczyński calls for EU member states to reintroduce the death penalty. This angers the EU.

=== September ===
- 3 September – The political party Left and Democrats is founded

=== November ===
- 12 November – 2006 Polish local elections, first round
- 21 November – 23 miners died in a blast in Halemba Coal Mine.
- 26 November – Polish local elections, 2006, second round

=== December ===
- December – Law and Justice MP Artur Górski introduced a parliamentary resolution to give Jesus Christ the title “King of Poland,” backed by 46 deputies, from League of Polish families (LPR), Law and Justice (PiS) party and the Peasants' Party (PSL).

== Sport ==
- 2005–06 Ekstraklasa
- 2006 Mieczysław Połukard Criterium of Polish Speedway Leagues Aces
- 2006 Polish Pairs Speedway Championship
- 2005–06 Polish Basketball League
- 2005–06 Polska Liga Hokejowa season
- 2006 PLFA season
- 2006 Polish Figure Skating Championships
- 2006 Tour de Pologne
- Poland at the 2006 Winter Olympics
- Poland at the 2006 Winter Paralympics

== Deaths ==
- 18 January: Jan Twardowski
- 14 July: Aleksander Wojtkiewicz, chess grandmaster (b. 1963)

== See also ==
- 2006 in Polish television
