= 2008 in Poland =

- Decades: 1980s; 1990s; 2000s; 2010s; 2020s
- See also: Other events of 2008; Timeline of Polish history

Events during the year 2008 in Poland.

== Incumbents ==
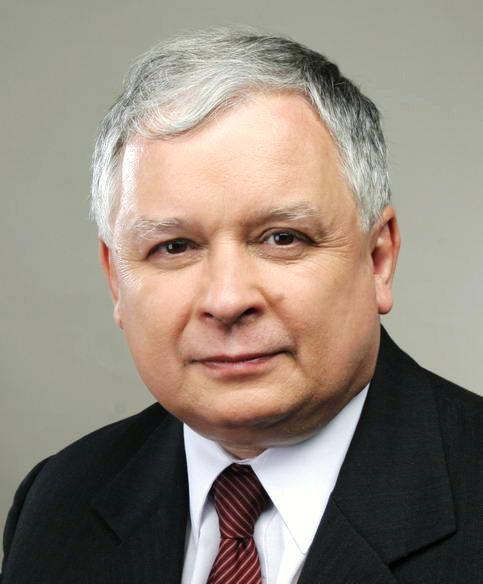
Lech Kaczyński

Incumbents
Position	Person	Party
President	Lech Kaczyński	Independent (Supported by Law and Justice)
Prime Minister	Donald Tusk	Civic Platform
Marshal of the Sejm	Bronisław Komorowski	Civic Platform
Marshal of the Senate	Bogdan Borusewicz	Independent (Supported by the Civic Platform)

== Events ==
=== January ===
- 1 January – Town rights of Boguchwała were restored.
- 23 January – Mirosławiec air disaster; an EADS CASA C-295 military transport plane crashed as it approached the Mirosławiec runway, killing all passengers and crew: 20 victims. 3 days of national mourning followed.

=== March ===
- 1 March – Cyclone Emma causes damage in Poland

=== April ===
- 16 April: Skra Bełchatów won their fourth Polish Volleyball Championship defeating AZS Częstochowa in the finals (see 2007–08 Polish Volleyball League).

=== June ===
- 4 June
  - 6 miners died in a blast in Borynia Coal Mine.
  - Prokom Trefl Sopot won their fifth Polish Basketball Championship defeating Turów Zgorzelec in the finals.

=== August ===
- 5–6 June – 2008 Poland tornado outbreak; 4 fatalities.

=== September ===
- 3–7 September 2008 – Pruszków hosts the 2008 UEC European Track Championships.

=== October ===
- 19 October – Unibax Toruń won their fourth Team Speedway Polish Championship defeating Unia Leszno in the finals (see 2008 Polish speedway season).

== Deaths ==
=== July ===
- 10 July: Krystyna Kersten, Polish historian.
- 13 July: Bronisław Geremek, Polish politician, died in a car accident.
- 14 July: Antoni Heda, Polish general and partisan.

== See also ==
- 2008 in Polish television
