= 2007 in Poland =

- Decades: 1980s; 1990s; 2000s; 2010s; 2020s
- See also: Other events of 2007; Timeline of Polish history

Events during the year 2007 in Poland.

== Incumbents ==
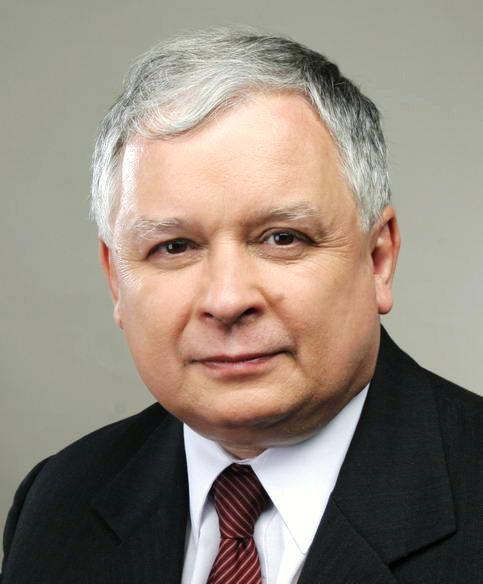
Lech Kaczyński

Incumbents
Position	Person	Party	Notes
President	Lech Kaczyński	Independent (Supported by Law and Justice)	
Prime Minister	Jarosław Kaczyński	Law and Justice	Until 16 November 2007
Prime Minister	Donald Tusk	Civic Platform	From 16 November 2007
Marshal of the Sejm	Marek Jurek	Law and Justice/Right of the Republic	Until 27 April 2007
Marshal of the Sejm	Ludwik Dorn	Law and Justice	From 27 April 2007 until 5 November 2007
Marshal of the Sejm	Bronisław Komorowski	Civic Platform	From 5 November 2007
Marshal of the Senate	Bogdan Borusewicz	Independent (Supported by Law and Justice and the Civic Platform)	Supported by the Civic Platform from November 2007

=== Elections ===
2007 Polish parliamentary election
Party	Leader	Sejm			Senate
Party	Leader	Seats	Popular vote	Percentage	Seats
Civic Platform	Donald Tusk	209 / 460	6,701,010	41.5%	60 / 100
Law and Justice	Jarosław Kaczyński	166 / 460	5,183,477	32.1%	39 / 100
Left and Democrats	Aleksander Kwaśniewski	53 / 460	2,122,981	13.2%	0 / 100
Polish People's Party	Waldemar Pawlak	31 / 460	1,437,638	8.9%	0 / 100
German Minority		1 / 460	32,462	0.2%	0 / 100
Local lists and parties		N/A			1 / 100
Other	SRP, LPR, PPP, PK, SP	0 / 460	664,634 (Total)	4.1% (Total)	0 / 100
Total and turnout		460	16,477,734	53.9%	100

== Events ==
=== January ===
- 1 January: Town rights of Daleszyce and Wojnicz were restored.
- 18 January: Storm Kyrill: 6 fatalities

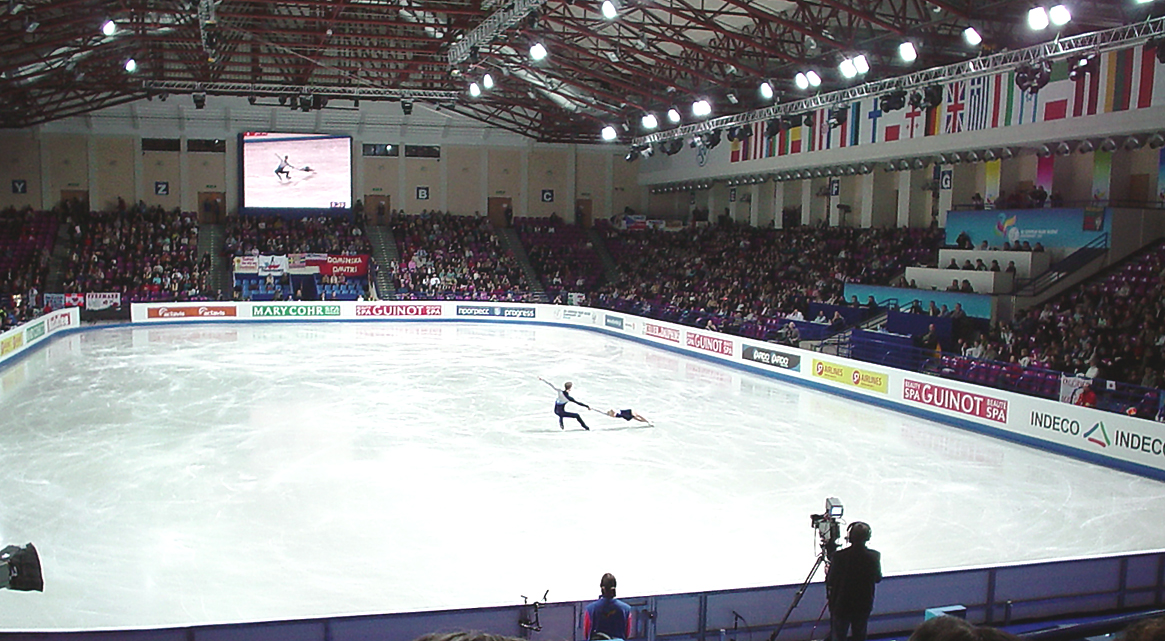
2007 European Figure Skating Championships in Warsaw, 24 January 2007

- 22–28 January: Warsaw hosts the 2007 European Figure Skating Championships.

=== May ===
- 3 May: Bączkowski v Poland verdict of a European Court of Human Rights concerning Poland is delivered
- 18 May: Skra Bełchatów won their third Polish Volleyball Championship defeating Jastrzębski Węgiel in the finals (see 2006–07 Polish Volleyball League).

=== July ===
- 22 July: 26 Polish pilgrims die in an accident on the Rampe de Laffrey in France.

=== August ===
- 16 August: Nangar Khel incident in Afghanistan involves Polish soldiers

=== October ===
- 27 October: 2007 Polish parliamentary election

== Deaths ==
=== January ===
- 23 February: Ryszard Kapuściński, journalist, writer

== See also ==
- 2007 in Polish television
