= Włodowo =

- Village
- Location within Poland
- Coordinates: 53°57′N 20°9′E
- Country: Poland
- Voivodeship: Warmian-Masurian
- County: Olsztyn
- Gmina: Świątki
- Population: 256

Włodowo [vwɔˈdɔvɔ] is a village in the administrative district of Gmina Świątki, within Olsztyn County, Warmian-Masurian Voivodeship, in northern Poland.
