= Józef Gąsienica =

Polish Nordic combined skier (1941–2005)

Józef Gąsienica (23 March 1941 in Zakopane – 14 May 2005 in Zakopane) was a Polish Nordic combined skier who competed in the late 1960s and early 1970s. His best finish at the Winter Olympics was sixth in the Nordic combined event at Grenoble in 1968.
