= Society of Christ =

Male religious congregation of the Catholic Church

- Latin: Societas Christi pro Emigrantibus Polonis; Polish: Towarzystwo Chrystusowe dla Polonii Zagranicznej
- Abbreviation: Post-nominal letters: S.Chr.
- Nickname: Chrystusowcy
- Formation: August 22, 1932; 93 years ago
- Founders: Venerable August Hlond; Venerable Ignacy Posadzy
- Type: Clerical Religious Congregation of Pontifical Right (for Men)
- Purpose: Spiritual care of Poles living abroad
- Headquarters: General Motherhouse ul. Panny Marii 4; 61-108 Poznań, Poland
- Region served: Worldwide
- Members: 374 members (350 priests) as of 2023
- Motto: Polish: Wszystko dla Boga i Polonii Zagranicznej; English: Everything for God and the Polish Diaspora
- Superior General: Fr. Krzysztof Olejnik, S.Chr.
- Patron saints: St. Joseph; St. Paul; St. Stanislaus Kostka; St. John Vianney; St. John Bosco; St. Margaret Mary Alacoque; St. Teresa of the Child Jesus
- Parent organization: Catholic Church
- Website: Official website

The Society of Christ for Polish Migrants (Latin: Societas Christi pro Emigrantibus Polonis; Polish: Towarzystwo Chrystusowe dla Polonii Zagranicznej), abbreviated S.Chr. and also known as the Chrystusowcy, is a Catholic clerical religious congregation of pontifical right for men founded by August Hlond and Ignacy Posadzy on August 8, 1932.

The priests of the Society of Christ serve the religious needs of Polish Catholic communities around the world. They are often asked by diocesan ordinaries to assume responsibility for a diocesan parish which then serves as the center of the diocese's ministry to the Polish community.

== History ==
The Society was founded on September 8, 1932, by August Hlond, Primate of Poland, with the help of Fr. Ignacy Posadzy, in Potulice near Nakło. After Poland regained independence in 1918, church and civil authorities made efforts to provide Poles living in other countries with every manner of assistance, especially spiritual care. Church leaders in Poland could not ignore the requests for Polish priests raised by Poles in all corners of the world. As guardian of the Polish emigrants abroad, Primate Cardinal A. Hlond consulted with the Holy See how to meet this demand. After receiving a directive from Pope Pius XI, he established the religious institute of the Society of Christ for Polish migrants Cardinal Hlond prepared the Society's Constitutions and by-laws. The Society opened its own seminary and houses in Gniezno, Poznań, Puszczykowo, and Dolsk, as well as printing and publishing houses in Potulice. The first priests of the Society left for pastoral work among the Polish diaspora in 1937 to Paris and London. In 1938, to Estonia. In 1939, the number of members of the Society increased from 40 to 184.

After the outbreak of World War II, the Main House in Poznań and the Mother House in Potulice were seized by the Germans, the Society lost all its property. During the war, priests of the Society officially worked in Bydgoszcz and within the territory of the General Government. Clandestinely, however, priests of the Society served in Pyzdry, Ostrów Wielkopolski, as well as within Germany, using false names in order to serve Polish slave laborers that were deported into Germany. With the permission of German occupying force, the Society's priests served Catholics in transit camps. During the war, 26 members of the Society died. During this same time, however, the Society continued seminary formation of its seminarians, in secret, in Kraków. As a result, 43 new priests were ordained during the war.

After the war ended, only the destroyed house in Ostrów Tumski in Poznań and the house in Puszczykowo were recovered. Since then, the Main House in Poznań has become the center of the Society and its headquarters. The priests of the Society of Christ were the first to undertake pastoral work in Western Pomerania. On May 6, 1945, Fr. Florian Berlik SChr, celebrated the first Holy Mass in post-war Szczecin. Gradually, priests of the Society began serving throughout West Pomerania, from Pyrzyce to Kamień Pomorski and Trzebiatów. To this day, despite the transfer of many parishes to the Archdiocese of Szczecin, the Society serves in 18 parishes in the Archdiocese of Szczecin, in addition to serving at parishes within the archdioceses of Gdańsk and Wrocław, and in the diocese of Koszalin.

Leaving Poland for pastoral work was very difficult following the war. Communist authorities made obtaining a passport very difficult. Despite this, priests of the Society continued to prepare and train candidates for the priesthood, anticipating that, one day, it would be possible to travel abroad. In fact, in order to ensure the Society had priests ready to serve when the time came, as early as 1945, the Society opened a dormitory for junior high school students. This later became the minor seminary which operated until 1962. The Society's major seminary began operating in 1948. Initially, it offered philosophical studies in Ziębice. Two years later, the seminary moved to Poznań and began offering theological studies.

On October 22, 1948, the founder of the Society of Christ, Venerable August Cardinal Hlond, Primate of Poland, died.

On April 22, 1950, the Holy See issued Decretum Laudis recognizing the presence of the Society of Christ in the Universal Church.

Due to changes brought about after the Polish October, 1956 was a watershed moment in the realizing of the mission of the Society. After the "thaw" of 1957, when it was easier to obtain passports, the Society undertook a foreign mission on a larger scale.

In 1964, the Society obtained the full approval of the Holy See. The years following saw the rapid development of the Society's ministry, with the establishment of numerous institutions. Religious priests and brothers traveled to new countries, and to other continents, taking up pastoral work there. In 1976, the Congregation already had 124 religious houses and pastoral centers.

Currently, the Society carries out its mission in parts of Poland, in 6 foreign provinces, and a select number of countries in which priests answer directly to the Superior General.

== Spirituality ==
The spirituality of the members of the Society of Christ is based primarily on the charism and spirituality of its founder, Venerable August Cardinal Hlond. This spirituality was implemented by Fr Ignacy Posadzy SChr, the Society's co-founder. The external sign of the religious spirituality of the Society of Christ is simple piety, based on a deep life of prayer and well-prepared liturgy. Emphasis is placed on the worship of the Eucharist, for which members of the Society show a deep personal love for the Holy Mass. The Society prioritizes spreading knowledge about the Holy Mass and promoting love of the Eucharist among the people of God. When this part of the Society's mission was presented to Pope Pius XI, he praised this part of the Society's mission adding that it should always remain a part of the Society ministry.

From the understanding and love of the Eucharist, in turn, flows a deep devotion to the Sacred Heart of Jesus. The worship of the Sacred Heart of Jesus, which should assume a formative character and shape the entirety of the Society's values, encourages members to undertake penance and make spiritual reparations to God for their sins, and those of the whole world. Asceticism in the Society takes a simple form and is understood mainly as fidelity to one's religious vows, faithfully executing the duties that one has been entrusted with, and accepting with faith all that God sends in His Providence.

The spirituality of the Society of Christ is Christ-centered, meaning that members of the Society are to follow Jesus Christ in their lives and conform themselves to Christ. This is the primary feature of the spirituality of the Society of Christ. This, in turn, constitutes basis for the existence of the Society of Christ, which is to give glory to God by caring for the sanctification of its own members and of Polish emigrants.

The second characteristic feature of the spirituality of the Society of Christ is the spirit of sacrifice. Sacrifice in religious life is a means to achieve the greater glory of God and is the starting point for the implementation of God's plans for the salvation of every person.

The third trait of the Society's spirituality is humble obedience and discipline in the spirit of faith. Respect for the Church and its hierarchical authority and teachings is expressed by each member's observance of the laws of the Church as well as the Society's own constitutions and by-laws.

The spirituality of the Society of Christ is also deeply Marian. Marian devotion is a basic element of Polish spirituality and piety. Devotion to the Blessed Virgin Mary is a means for members of the Society of Christ to inspire Poles living abroad to seek greater holiness through the imitation of Mary.

The titular celebration of the Society of Christ is the Solemnity of Christ the King, celebrated on the last Sunday of the liturgical year.

The patrons of the Congregation are: St. Joseph, St. Paul, St. Stanislaus Kostka, St. John Vianney, St. John Bosco, St. Teresa of the Child Jesus and St. Margaret Mary Alacoque.

== Formation ==
Formation begins at the novitiate in Mórkowo where candidates enter into postulancy. After about a month, postulants are accepted into novitiate. They then spend a year in prayer and discernment, prior to their first profession of temporary vows. After their first profession of vows, they are accepted into the seminary in Poznań. Seminary formation lasts six years during which, after their fifth year of formation, seminarians make their final profession of vows and are ordained deacons. Priestly ordination follows a year later. The Superior General and the General Council must explicitly grant approval prior to anyone making a profession of vows or accepting holy orders.

== Publications ==
Since its foundation, the Society has operated a publishing house. In 1933, the Society began issuing a bimonthly magazine devoted to the pastoral care of Poles in exile, entitled "Głos Seminarium Zagranicznego". From 1936, the Society began issuing a biblical-liturgical monthly entitled, "Msza Święta" (translation: Holy Mass) and, later, a hagiographic quarterly entitled "Cześć Świętych Polskich" (translation: Veneration of Polish Saints).

The Society continues its publishing tradition with the operation of two publishing houses: Hlondianum and Agape.

== Causes for Beatification ==
There are multiple open causes for the beatification of individuals related to the Society.

=== Venerable August Cardinal Hlond ===
The cause for the beatification of the Society's founder, Venerable August Cardinal Hlond, commenced January 2, 1992. The diocesan investigatory phase was completed October 21, 1996. On October 22, 2008, the cause's Positio was submitted to the Congregation for the Causes of Saints. On March 9, 2017, the Congregation's Theological Commission reviewed the Positio positively. On May 19, 2018, Pope Francis, after an audience with the Prefect of the Congregation for the Causes of Saints Angelo Cardinal Amato, signed a decree certifying the Hlond's heroic virtues and declaring him Venerable.

=== Venerable Ignacy Posadzy SChr ===
The cause for the beatification of the Society's co-founder and first Superior General, Venerable Father Ignacy Posadzy SChr, commenced on January 17, 2001. The diocesan investigatory phase was completed May 6, 2009. On September 3, 2009, the Congregation for the Causes of Saints issued a decree permitting the cause to continue in Rome. On July 7, 2011, the Congregation issued a decree validating the diocesan investigation and its report. On June 20, 2018, the cause's Positio was submitted to the Congregation. On November 30, 2021, the Positio was reviewed by the Congregation's Theological Commission, who positively opined it. The Congregation's commission of Bishops and Cardinals reviewed the Positio on December 13, 2022, and opined it positively. Posadzy's cause was then forwarded to the Pope for his approval. The Pope recognized Posadzy's heroic virtue and declared him Venerable.

=== Father Paweł Kontny SChr ===
In 1945, Father Paweł Kontny was killed by Soviet soldiers in Lędziny while protecting two girls from being kidnapped and raped by a Soviet officer. On February 9, 2022, the Society of Christ's postulator, Father Bogusław Kozioł SChr, submitted a formal request, Suplex libellus, to the Archbishop of Katowice Wiktor Skworc asking to begin the diocesan phase of the beatification process for Father Paweł Kontny SChr. On August 9, 2022, the Curia of the Archdiocese of Katowice, officially approved the text of a prayer for the beatification of Father Paweł Kontny. A film about Father Paweł Kontny is currently in development.

== Notable members ==
=== Józef Miękus SChr ===
In 1932, Józef Miękus was one of the first people to join the Society of Christ. As a seminarian he served as the Society of Christ's first chronicler, recording the Society's first years. As part of his studies, he attended seminary in Rome, returning to Poland after falling ill. In 1937, after a few months of illness, he died in the opinion of sainthood. He was the first seminarian, and the first member of the Society, to pass away. He is buried in Miłostowo cemetery in Poznań. His writings, which were compiled, edited, and published by Anna Zahorska in 1939 under the title Ofiara Poranna, presented the Society's early life, as well as his own spiritual reflections.

=== Father Rudolf Marszałek SChr ===
Chaplain during World War II, serving in the Home Army and National Armed Forces. As a member of the military arm of the Polish Underground State, he was arrested in December 1946 by the Ministry of Public Security. After spending a year in Mokotów Prison, he was sentenced to death on January 17, 1948. President Bolesław Bierut refused to exercise his pardon powers despite appeals. On March 8, 1948, Bierut ordered that the sentence go forth immediately. Marszałek was executed on March 10, 1948. The location of his grave is still unknown.

=== Father Florian Berlik SChr ===
Father Florian Berlik joined the Society of Christ in 1932, as one of the first members. Father Berlik was already a subdeacon when he joined the Society of Christ. On May 10, 1934, he was ordained a priest in by Venerable August Cardinal Hlond. As the first ordination, Father Berlik played a key role in the early years of the Society of Christ, assisting Father Ignacy Posadzy with the Society's development. During World War II, from January 1941 to December 10, 1941, he was imprisoned in Kielce. In May 1945, Father Florian Berlik celebrated the first post-war mass in Szczecin, beginning a tradition of the Society of Christ serving in the recovered territories in West Pomerania. He served as the Society of Christ second Superior General from 1968 to 1970, resigning early due to state of his health. He died on October 15, 1982, in Kiekrz and on October 19, 1982, he was buried in Miłostowo cemetery, Poznań.

=== Father Stanisław Ułaszkiewicz SChr ===
Father Stanisław Ułaszkiewicz was a priest of the Society of Christ and an outspoken critic of the Communist regime in Poland. He was born on November 9, 1923. During World War II, he was deported into the Third Reich for forced labor. Ułaszkiewicz returned to Poland in 1945 and joined the Society of Christ. He was ordained on June 7, 1952. After ordination, Ułaszkiewicz served in multiple parishes in West Pomeraria. In the 1960s and 70s, Ułaszkiewicz served as a priest in France and Canada. After returning to Poland in 1981, Ułaszkiewicz served as a chaplain in a hospital in Szczecin. In April 1984, he was one of the first members of the Society of Christ to work in Iraq where he began serving Polish workers. He died due to an apparent drowning on December 31, 1985, near Nasiriyah, Iraq. Ułaszkiewicz was buried in the Baghdad cathedral. The status of his grave is unknown. Ułaszkiewicz's death remains the subject of controversy and speculation.

=== Bishop Stanisław Stefanek SChr ===
Bishop Stefanek was ordained as a priest of the Society of Christ on June 28, 1959. He served as the Society's vicar general. He was appointed an auxiliary bishop of the Archdiocese of Szczecin-Kamień on July 4, 1980. On October 26, 1996, he was appointed as the Bishop of Łomża. On November 11, 2011, Pope Benedict XVI accepted his resignation and appointed Janusz Stepnowski to succeed him. Stefanek died on January 17, 2020, in Lublin. On January 23, 2020, Stefanek was buried in the Łomża cathedral.

== Congregation structure ==
The Society, and the realization of its mission, is directed by the Superior General and General Council. The Society is divided into provinces, which are overseen by their respective provincials and provincial councils.

Report directly to the General Council: Poland, Belarus, Ukraine, Greece & South Africa

Queen of Polonia Province (North America): United States & Canada

Immaculate Conception Province (South America): Brazil

Most Sacred Heart of Jesus Province (Europe): United Kingdom & Ireland

St. Joseph Province (Europe): Germany, Netherlands, Italy & Hungary

Our Lady of Częstochowa Province (Europe): France & Spain

Holy Family Province (Oceania): Australia & New Zealand

== List of Superiors General of the Society of Christ ==
List of superior generals of the Society of Christ from 178 – till date.
No.	Portrait	Name (Birth–Death)	Term
1	Portrait of Ignacy Posadzy	Ignacy Posadzy (1898–1984)	August 22, 1932 – July 5, 1968
2		Florian Berlik (1909–1982)	July 5, 1968 – February 20, 1970
3		Wojciech Kania (1915–2002)	February 20, 1970 – July 2, 1976
4		Czesław Kamiński (1915–2008)	July 2, 1976 – July 6, 1983
5		Edward Szymanek (1933–2018)	July 6, 1983 – July 1989
6		Bogusław Nadolski (1933–2018)	July 1989 – July 11, 1995
7		Tadeusz Winnicki (1946–)	July 11, 1995 – September 17, 2007
8		Tomasz Sielicki (1954–)	September 17, 2007 – July 4, 2013
9		Ryszard Głowacki (1956–2020)	July 4, 2013 – July 11, 2019
10		Krzysztof Olejnik (1973–)	July 11, 2019 – Incumbent

== Bibliography ==
- Kołodziej, Bernard. Archiwum Towarzystwa Chrystusowego dla Polonii Zagranicznej (dzieje i udostepnianie) (in Polish).
- Rocznik Towarzystwa Chrystusowego 2021 (in Polish). Poznań: Sekretariat Generalny Towarzystwa Chrystusowego. 2020.
