= Stanisław Albinowski =

Polish economist, columnist, and journalist (born 1923)

Stanisław Józef Albinowski (20 July 1923, Lwów – 25 January 2005, Warsaw) was a Polish economist, columnist and journalist on economics.

== Biography ==
He was born in Lwów, Poland. During World War II he was a forced labourer for German companies in Nazi-occupied Poland (1940–1943) and Lithuania (Klaipėda, 1944).

In 1960 he graduated in economics from the Political Economics Division of Warsaw University (Wydzial Ekonomii Politycznej Uniwersystetu Warszawskiego).

He was a journalist for many Polish newspapers in years 1952–1980, and correspondent in Bonn, Germany (1968–1972).

== Government expert ==
Stanisław Albinowski was also a governmental experts groups working on reports on how to deal with economic crisis in Poland in the 1980s, participating in publications: The report on the economy (Raport o stanie gospodarki) and The programme to overcome the crisis, (Program przezwyciężenia kryzysu) in 1981.

== Publications ==
=== Newspapers and magazines ===
For most of his life he was a columnist and journalist for the biggest Polish newspapers and magazines, including:

- Gazeta Wyborcza
- Kultura
- Po Prostu
- Polityka
- Prawo i Gospodarka
- Puls Biznesu
- Trybuna Ludu
- Zarządzanie
- Życie Gospodarcze
- Życie Warszawy

=== Books ===
- EWG a rynek światowy, 1965 (EEC and the World Market, published in Polish, translated into English, French, and German)
- Handel między krajami o różnych ustrojach. Po II wojnie światowej i prognozy do 1980 r., 1968 (Trade between countries with various constitutions. After WWII and forecasts till 1980)
- Muellerowie na codzień, 1979 (The Muellers in everyday life)
- Alarm dla gospodarki trwa, 1982 (Alarm for the economy)
- Nawigatorzy gospodarki i inne polemiki, 1987 (The navigators of the economics and other polemics)
- Pułapka energetyczna gospodarki polskiej, 1988 (The energetic trap of Polish economy)
- Bogactwo i nędza narodów, Dom Wydawniczy Elipsa, Warszawa 1996 (The wealth and poverty of nations)

== Selected awards ==
- 1967, 1974 - Nagroda Klubu Publicystów Międzynarodowych SDP (Award of the International Columnist Club of the Polish Journalists Association)
- 1974 - Nagroda Prezesa RSW Prasa-Książka-Ruch (Award of the President of the Ruch Prasa-Ksiazka-Ruch /Polish press publishers and distributors)
- 1974 - I Nagroda Klubu Publicystów Ekonomicznych SDP (1st Award of the Economic Columnist Club of the Polish Journalists Association)
- Krzyż Oficerski OOP
- Złoty Krzyż Zasługi
