= Lynching at Włodowo =

2005 murder in Poland

The lynching at Włodowo (Polish: Samosąd we Włodowie, Lincz we Włodowie) took place in a village of Włodowo in North-Eastern Poland on 1 July 2005. Local men killed a criminal Józef "Ciechanek" Ciechanowicz who was terrorizing the community.

== Background ==
Ciechanowicz was a 60 year old recidivist who spent over 30 years in prison, for batteries, thefts and rapes. While out of prison he extorted pensions and bullied residents of Włodowo and Brzydowo villages and robbed local shops. According to his neighbors, he often wandered around while drunk, with an axe or a cleaver in his hand, mumbling that he would kill someone eventually, because he wanted to go back home (prison). The police did not always respond to calls, and when they did, their intervention had no effect.

== Death ==
On the day of his death, Ciechanowicz entered the yard of Winek's family house where he saw Jadwiga Rybak, daughter of his former mistress. The woman took her mother in hiding, after he had wounded her with a screwdriver. Ciechanowicz was upset because he could no longer seize her pension. Earlier he had broken a bottle on Jadwiga's head.

Tomasz Winek, owner of the house, ordered him to leave but instead of retreating, Ciechanowicz brandished a beetroot cleaver. Winek took a wooden bat from the pile and fought Ciechanowicz who gashed him with the cleaver. Winek's neighbour came to help and forced Ciechanowicz to flee.

Winek's wife called the police, but heard that no police cars were available. Later on they drove to nearby Dobre Miasto. Police officers were still refusing to send officers to Włodowo, claiming that none were available. After they returned, a group of locals (including two Winek brothers) gathered. Ciechanowicz returned, waiving his cleaver and threatening to kill "you all and your brats" (Winek's young son was playing in the yard), the group started to chase him. They caught him in the hollow near the forest and beat him with bats, shovels and car springs. He was alive when they left him, although he died from these wounds.

== Trials ==
After the incident Tomasz Winek and his brothers Mirosław and Krzysztof were arrested but were released by the prosecutor's decision on 7 November 2005. People of nearby villages raised money to pay legal expenses. On 23 October 2007 they were sentenced to 2 years in prison and placed on probation for 3 years. However, on 15 January 2009, an appeals court extended the sentence to 4 years of prison, without parole. On 18 December 2009, they were pardoned by the president of Poland Lech Kaczyński and their sentence was changed to 10 years of probation.

Three other persons received minor suspended sentences.

Two police officers from Dobre Miasto police station who did not react to calls for help received suspended sentences, for failure to execute their duty. One of them was dismissed from service and the other one was downgraded. The court did not accept their defense that they had no means to react.

In January 2012 the Winek brothers were apprehended again for 48 hours in relation to the disappearance of a man living in their village. They were released without an accusation and a court directed financial compensation for them.

== Popular culture ==
The event was pictured in the television series Pitbull and Kryminalni. It was also an inspiration for the Polish thriller movie Lincz.
