= Zdzisław Gierwatowski =

Polish footballer

Personal information
- Date of birth: 31 March 1920
- Place of birth: Warsaw, Poland
- Date of death: 12 May 2005 (aged 85)
- Place of death: Warsaw, Poland
- Height: 1.82 m (6 ft 0 in)
- Position: Defender

Senior career*
Years	Team	Apps	(Gls)
1935–1937	Orkan Warsaw		
1938–1939	Polonia Warsaw		
1945	Wisła Kraków		
1945–1950	Polonia Warsaw		
1951	Gwardia Warsaw		

Managerial career
- Lublinianka
- 1961: Polonia Warsaw
- 1961: Polonia Bydgoszcz
- 1962: Polonia Warsaw
- Huragan Wołomin
- Ruch Piaseczno
- 1966–1968: Polonia Warsaw
- Poland U19
- * Club domestic league appearances and goals

Zdzisław Gierwatowski (31 March 1920 – 12 May 2005) was a Polish football manager and player.

Having originated with Orkan Warsaw, he started his career in the 1935 season. He was a left-sided defender with one of the most acclaimed playing stances in the Polish game during the 1940s. Serving in active combat in Warsaw during the World War II, Gierwatowski never regained his form post-1945; he remained in football as a trainer and coach.

== Honours ==
=== Player ===
Polonia Warsaw

- Polish Football Championship: 1946
