= Szadłowice =

- Village
- Location within Poland
- Coordinates: 52°50′25″N 18°19′16″E
- Country: Poland
- Voivodeship: Kuyavian-Pomeranian
- County: Inowrocław
- Gmina: Gniewkowo
- Population: 410

Szadłowice (German: Schadlowitz) is a village in Inowrocław County, Kuyavian-Pomeranian Voivodeship, in north-central Poland.
