= Battle of Gdów =

Only battle of the Kraków uprising in 1846

- Part of Kraków Uprising
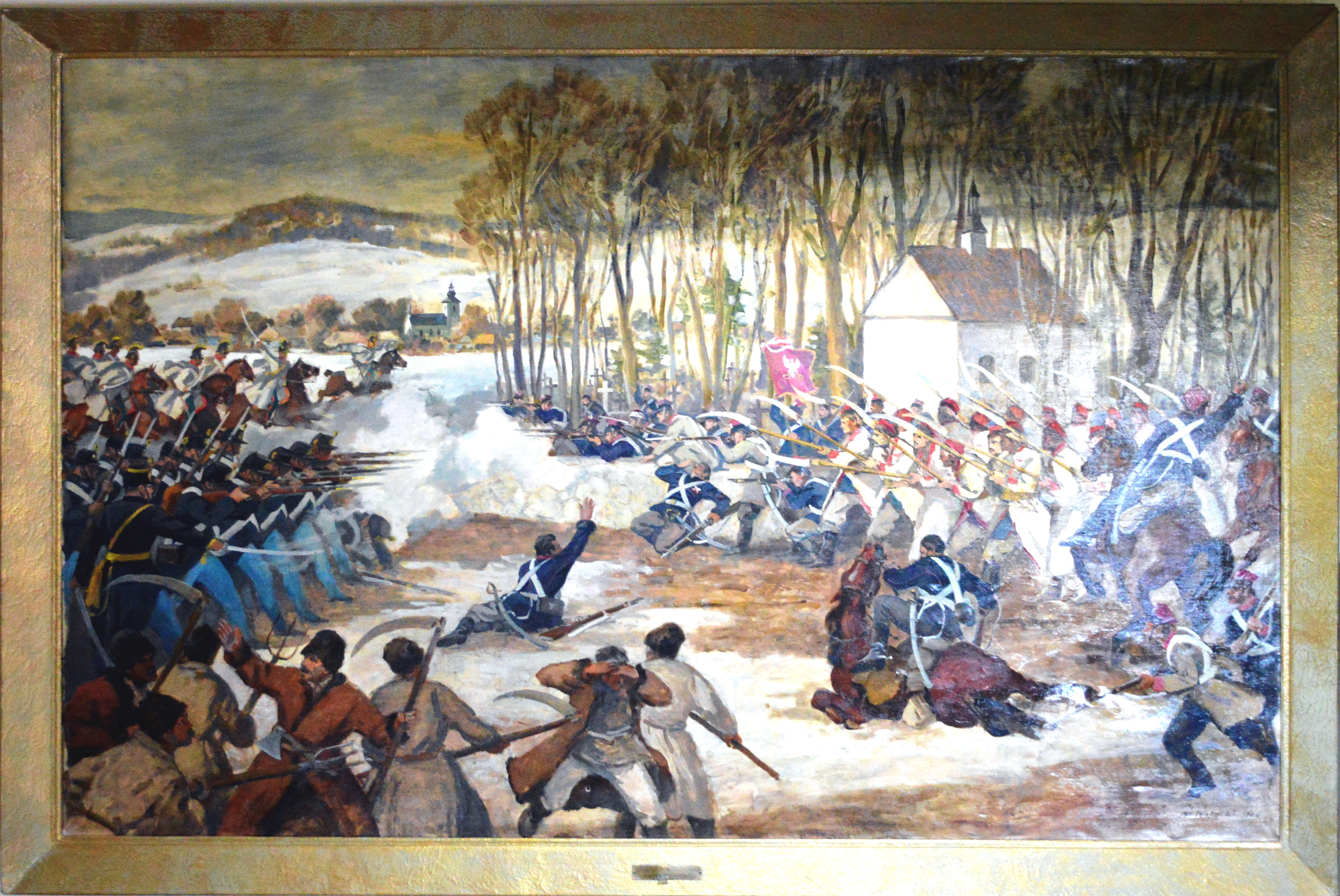
- Battle of Gdów painting by Mieczysław Wątorski in the Gdów town hall
Date	26 February 1846
Location	Gdów
Result	Austrian victory

Belligerents
Polish insurgents	Austrian Empire

Commanders and leaders
Jakub Suchorzewski	Ludwig von Benedek

Strength
380 insurgents: 260 infantry; 120 cavalry	482 soldiers: 327 infantry; 155 cavalry

Casualties and losses
154 killed 20 prisoners	Two Austrian cavalrymen taken prisoner briefly One horse wounded in the leg

The Battle of Gdow (Polish: Bitwa pod Gdowem) took place on February 26, 1846, near Gdów, in the Free City of Kraków. It was the only significant battle of the Kraków Uprising. A rebel unit of 380 men, commanded by Jakub Suchorzewski, was defeated by a 480-strong Austrian Army detachment led by Ludwig von Benedek. The Austrians were supported by approximately 500 local peasants (see Galician slaughter). Rebel losses were estimated at 154 killed, while Austrian losses were minimal.

== Background ==
After the Kraków Uprising began, an Austrian detachment under Colonel Ludwig von Benedek departed from Tarnów toward Krakow. Von Benedek's unit consisted of nearly 500 men, including 330 infantry and 150 cavalry. Along the way, his forces were reinforced by local peasants from villages such as Marszowice, Nieznanowice, and Pierzchów. The peasants were promised a hundredweight of salt and 5 złotys for each captured rebel.

== Battle ==
Meanwhile, a rebel unit of 380 men, mostly residents of Krakow and local szlachta, under Colonel Jakub Suchorzewski, gathered in Łazany, 8 km southeast of Wieliczka. On the morning of February 26, the insurgents reached Gdów and dispersed throughout the town in search of food. Bolesław Limanowski wrote that Suchorzewski did not expect the Austrians to find him so quickly, which is why he allowed his soldiers to rest. Suchorzewski himself went to a local manor for a meal and was reportedly not even in Gdów during the battle.

The Austrian troops first encountered a few insurgents standing guard at the bridge over the Raba. After exchanging fire, the Poles quickly retreated to the center of Gdów, where they warned the rest of the insurgents about the approaching enemy. Many of the insurgents, drunk and disorganized, fled from the inn and houses, crowding in the town center. Meanwhile, von Benedek launched a flanking maneuver, surrounding a unit of kosynierzy near the cemetery wall. They were then attacked by enraged peasants, and only a few were saved by the Austrians, who intervened too late. Suchorzewski fled to Dobczyce, taking with him the rebel funds.

Altogether, the rebels suffered 154 casualties, all of whom were buried in three pits at the cemetery. The survivors fled to Kraków, and the next day, the Austrians entered Wieliczka.

== Sources ==
- Mała Encyklopedia Wojskowa (Wydanie I), 1967.
- Jerzy Zdrada, Historia Polski 1795-1914, Warszawa 2007.
- Julius Kreipner, Geschichte des K.und K.Infanterie-Regimentes Nr. 34 für immerwährende Zeiten Wilhelm I. Deutscher Kaiser und König von Preussen, 1733-1900, Kosice 1900.

== See also ==
- Austrian Poland
- Revolutions of 1848
