= Andrzej Kusionowicz Grodyński =

Polish lawyer (1861–1925)

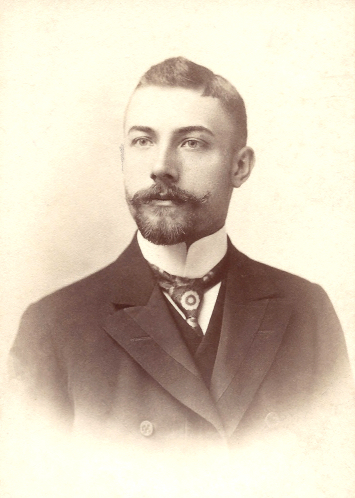
- Circuit Judge; President of Court of Appeal
- Born: Andrzej Kusionowicz; October 22, 1861; Gdów, Galicia, Poland
- Died: July 24, 1925 (aged 63); Cieszyn, Silesia, Poland
- Spouses: Anna Krężołek Grodyńska; Alicja Matter Grodyńska
- Children: Bogusław, Stanisław

Andrzej Kusionowicz Grodyński (22 October 1861 – 24 July 1925), born Andrzej Szymon Kusionowicz, was a Polish lawyer who worked as a Silesian circuit judge based in Cieszyn for much of his career. Kusionowicz was also the editor of Gwiazdka Cieszyńska from 1889 to 1890. An associate of Paweł Stalmach, who founded Gwiazdka Cieszyńska, he was also a friend of Józef Londzin with whom he shared the early vision of Cieszyn Silesia joining Galicia in a new Polish state independent of Austrian rule.

On 7 September 1906 Kusionowicz changed his surname to Grodyński. Following World War I, Grodyński participated as a Polish delegate in the talks to settle the new border with Czechoslovakia and represented the Polish High Court in Kraków for the legal transitioning of Silesia into the newly independent Poland. Grodyński was later appointed president of the Silesian Court of Appeal in Katowice after its establishment on 16 June 1922.

== Early years ==
One of a large number of children of Sylwester and Anna (née Krężołek), Andrzej was born in Gdów, Galicia, Poland, to where his father had moved from Chocholów subsequent to the Battle of Gdów. (The sole battle of the Kraków Uprising was chronicled by Sylwester’s “uncle” Ludwik Kusionowicz who in 1846 was the Gdów parish priest. Ludwik, who like Sylwester was born in Czchów, was later appointed Dean of Wieliczka and by EC/RM Ordination of 26 July 1871 was awarded the honorary title of Canon of Tarnów.) In addition to starting the first 'state school' in the district, conducting lessons in Polish in the former parish school building, Andrzej’s father, Sylwester, performed as the church organist. Andrzej was raised in Western Galicia but when he was only fifteen his father died (on 4 July 1877) and his elder brother Józef, a notary in Milówka, became his legal guardian. After completing his schooling Andrzej attended universities in Kraków, Graz and Vienna, then moved to Cieszyn Silesia due to his keen interest in Polish affairs centred in that region.

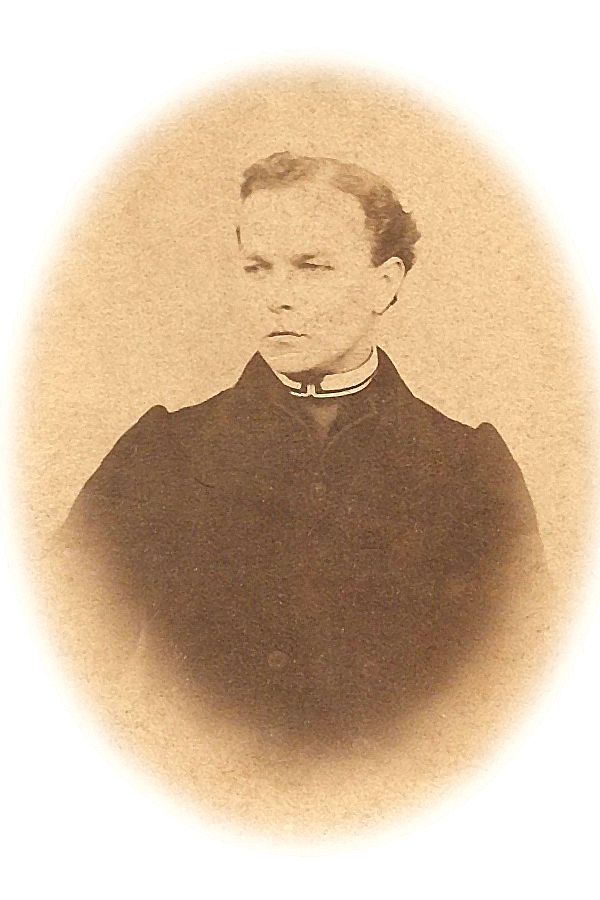
Sylwester Kusionowicz (circa 1870), Andrzej's father

In 1887 "Jędrzéj" became a member of the Czytelnia Ludowa which was a Polish cultural society which facilitated public access to reading materials and political interest that had been furthered in his university studies was expressed through his editorship of Gwiazdka Cieszyńska, from 12 January 1889 to 7 June 1890. This culminated in a nationalistic call for Polish Catholics and Polish Protestants to work together in selecting and voting for candidates in the forthcoming elections for the Silesian Parliament. Although the Sejm at the time was dominated by German representatives, this was a controversial plea given that the publisher of Gwiazdka Cieszyńska from 1889 was the Katolickie Towarzystwo Prasowe (Catholic Press Society). On 14 June 1890 fr Józef Londzin, in his first editorial on taking over from Kusionowicz, made no direct reference to this patriotic call by his predecessor but informed readers that he had been entrusted by the ‘Catholic hierarchy’ with the publication’s editorship before then making his own plea for the Polish nation and people of Silesia to guard against the forces of liberalism and Germanisation.

While Kusionowicz was the editor, Gwiazdka Cieszyńska had continued to espouse the ideals of Paweł Stalmach in advocating support of many social causes ranging from improving the welfare of the poor to progressing literacy and education levels, especially among the ethnic Poles in Silesia and Galicia. Andrzej also worked as secretary of the Cieszyn Education Society, of which Stalmach was the President, and completed his studies for a doctorate of law from Jagiellonian University on 14 July 1891. That same year he participated with Jan Michejda, Ignacy Świeży, Hilary Filasiewicz, Antoni Dyboski, Adam Sikora, Szczepan Chrapek, Mieczysław Kopciński, Bolesław Rzepecki and Maryan Lanikiewicz in setting up the Cieszyn branch of Sokół ('Falcon').

== Later years ==
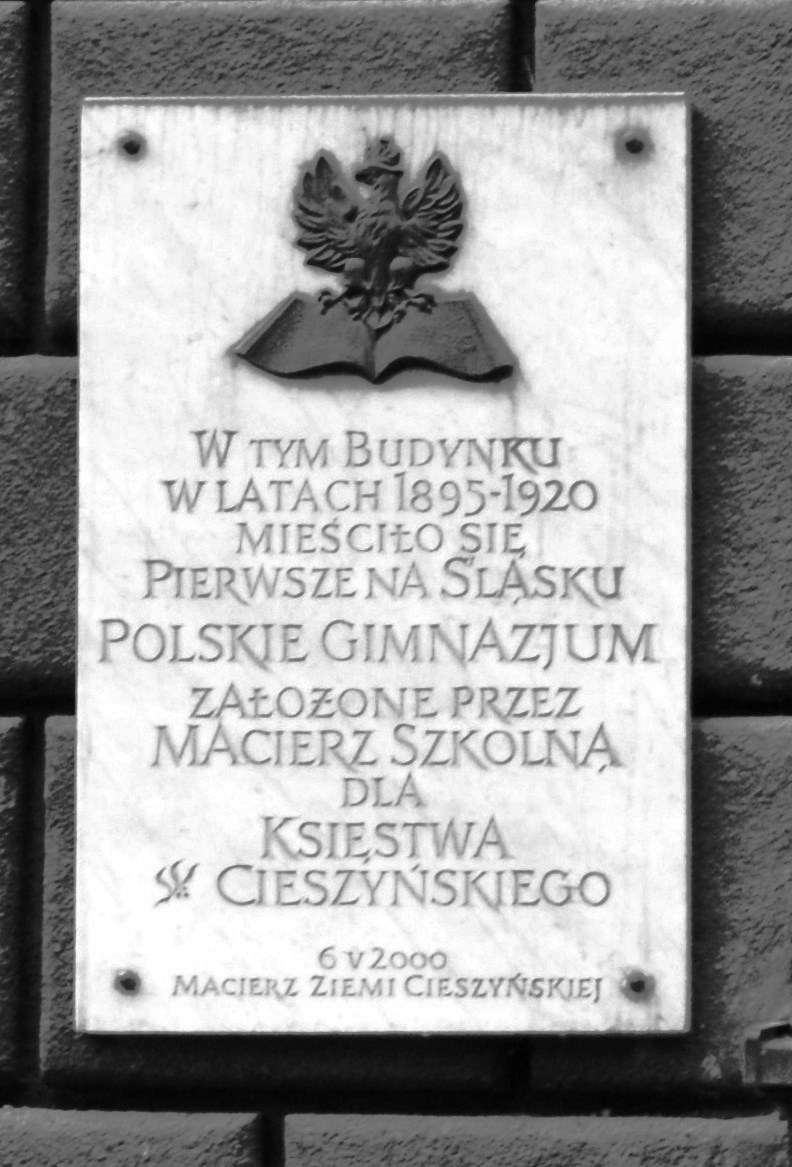
'First Polish secondary school in Silesia

After graduating as a doctor of law in 1891, Grodyński joined the law office of Jan Michejda, where in March 1893 he transferred to the judicial profession. This career progression followed the birth of his son, Bogusław Jan Sylwester, on 19 August 1892, but on 28 April 1894 tragedy struck in Grodyński's personal life when he lost his first wife Anna (Vesnicky Polášek by adoption) who at only thirty years of age died from tuberculosis. [Bogusław, their only child, was commissioned during WWI as an officer in the Second Cavalry Brigade of the Polish Legions, but following the Battle of Rarańcza he was imprisoned near Synowódzku (now in Ukraine). He managed to escape in 1918 but died in Kobierzyn chapel hospital in Kraków on 14 July 1922.]

On 3 June 1896 Grodyński married Alicja Matter, the daughter of Alfons, a renowned builder, businessman and councillor in Cieszyn who was also a member of the Association of Silesian Catholics and who also supported the opening of what was the first recognized "Polish School" in Cieszyn. In 1897 Grodyński was appointed as a judge in Jabłonków where he moved with Alicja before relocating again in 1903 to take up the position of head of court in Strumień (where Oskar Zawisza became the local priest). In 1907 he transferred to the District Court in Cieszyn, in which city he continued to reside (at 34 Bielitzerstrasse now Bielska street) even after his later appointment as President of the Court of Appeal in Katowice.

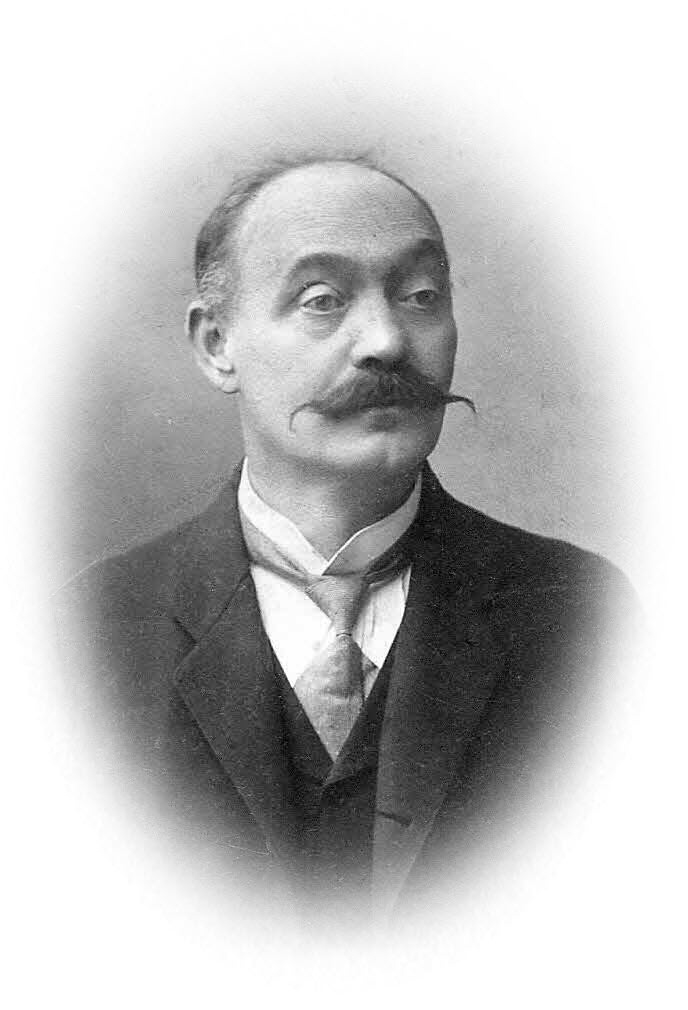
Andrzej Grodyński circa 1912

Following the establishment in 1918 of the National Council of the Duchy of Cieszyn after World War I, comprising representatives of Polish political groups that had arisen over the preceding fifty years (and including Józef Londzin, Jan Michejda, and Tadeusz Reger), the 'Easements Commission' was set up with Grodyński appointed as its chairman. In addition to also carrying out his regular judicial duties, Grodyński participated in other significant meetings for the new Polish state and early in 1921 he was a member of the Polish delegation that entered into the first official talks with Czech representatives following the peace agreement reached in Paris on 20 November 1920.

The early years of the Second Polish Republic placed onerous demands on Poland's judiciary which in turn reportedly led to a high mortality rate amongst those who chose to keep working in the service of their country rather than retire. Grodyński died in 1925 and is buried at Cieszyn Municipal Cemetery, but outside the impressive family tomb erected by his father-in-law Alfons Matter. The funeral procession reflected his local, regional and national standing, with fellow judges, six priests and representatives across all levels of society, including the military, led by his close friend fr Józef Londzin.

== Personal life ==
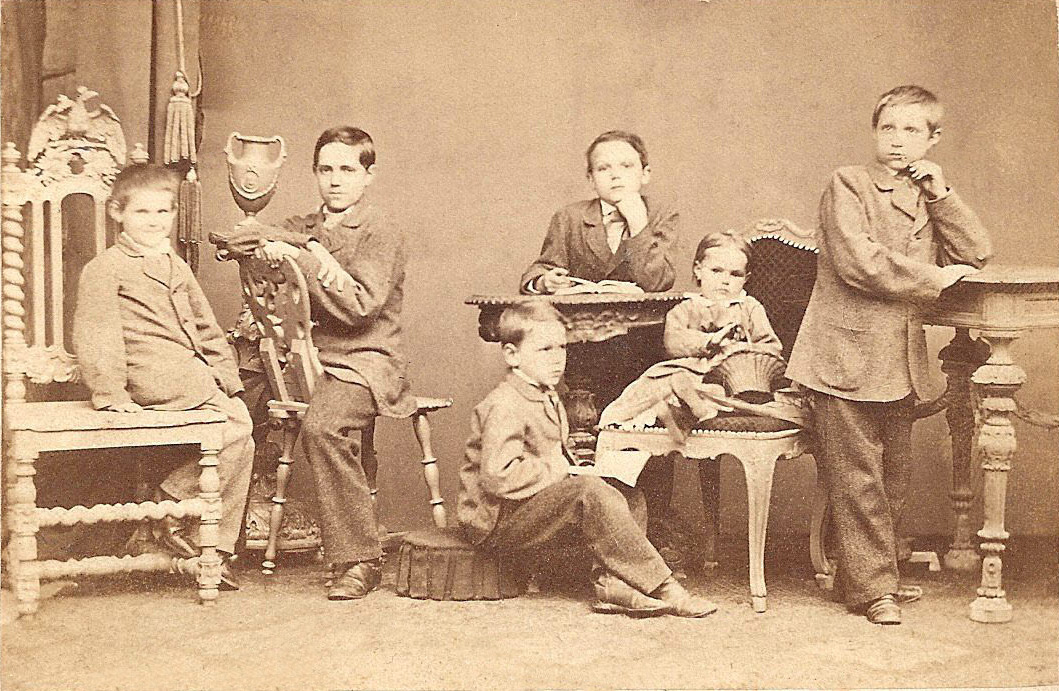
Kusionowicz brothers Józef, Marjan, Władysław, Andrzej (seated front stool) and sister Karolina

Apart from Józef Adalbert who was born in Dębno, near Brzesko (14 March 1849), registers at the church of Gdów indicate the births of brothers and sisters Ludwika Marja (25 August 1850, died), Marja Józefa (1 March 1852, died), Marjan Ludwik Apollinar (9 December 1853), Walerja Joanna (12 July 1856 - 19 October 1932), Bronisława Anna (17 June 1858 died after 4 days), Władysław Marcin (8 November 1859), Aleksander (11 January 1864 died after 1 day), Marja Aniela (11 January 1864 died after 7 days), Karolina Stanisława (8 January 1865), Anna (born and died in 1867), Stanisława Anna (10 June 1869), Józefa Rozalja (21 February 1872) and Wiktorja Ewa (21 December 1872 died after 1 day).

Andrzej's brother, Józef Kusionowicz (1849-1922), apparently changed his surname to Grodyński in 1893 and moved from Milówka to Niepołomice, near Kraków, while continuing to practise as a notary. Married to Aniela Fedrerowicz (1857-1937), sister of Jan Kanty Federowicz, they had a number of children. Jerzy Grodyński aided in the start-up of the Polish Scout Movement, dr Tadeusz Grodyński worked for the national bank and Jan Kanty Grodyński became a high-ranking officer in the military.

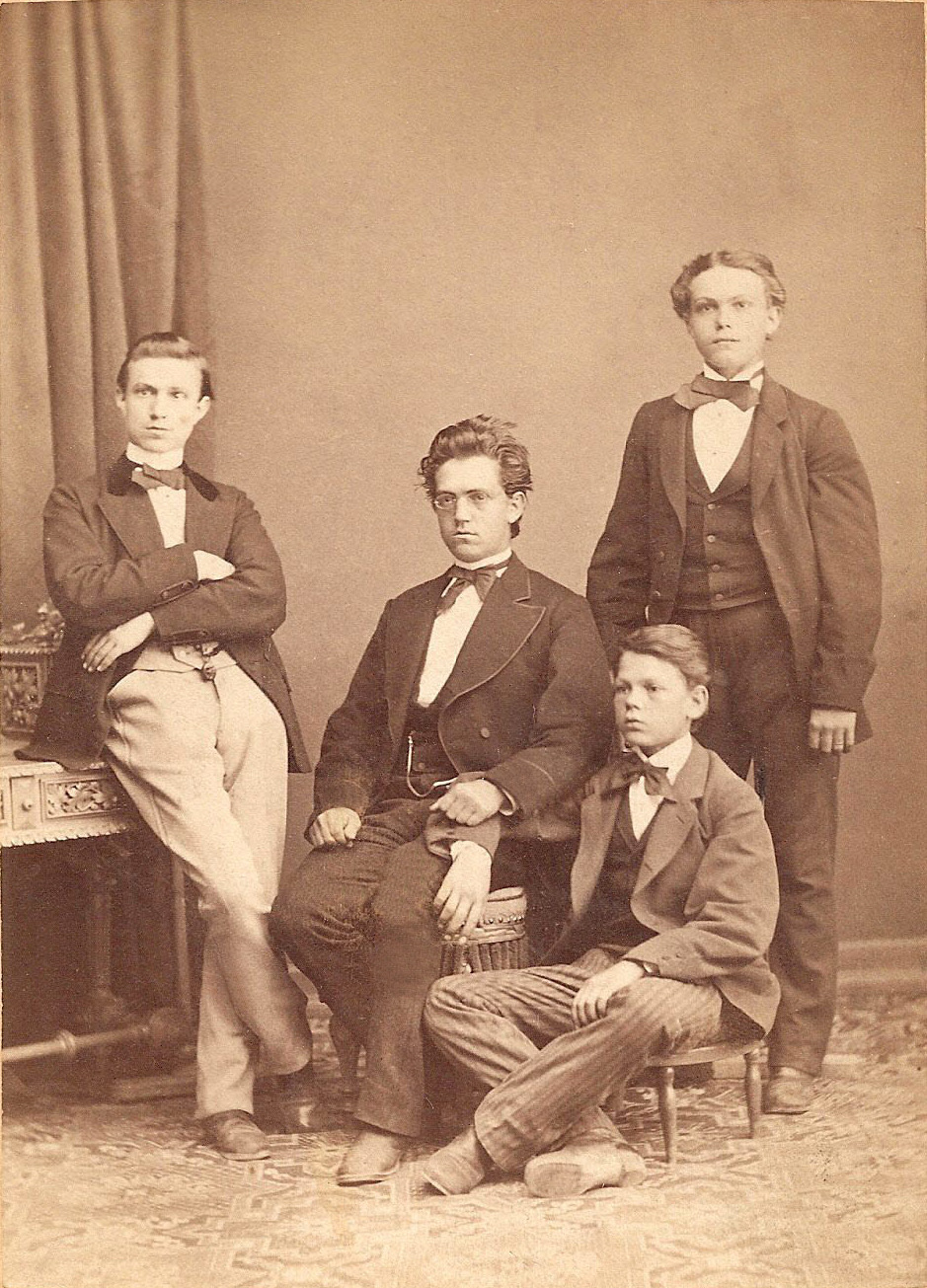
Four Kusionowicz brothers with Andrzej (seated on stool) beside the eldest brother Józef

Władysław Kusionowicz Grodyński (1859-1939) rose to the position of Chief Magistrate of Kraków and in 1908 was made an honorary member of 'Resursy Urzędniczej w Krakowie' (Kraków Administrators Association). From records of the period it appears Władysław also changed his surname from Kusionowicz to Grodyński in 1893. Władysław and his wife Zofia had three daughters, Elżbieta, Janina and Irena, as well as a son, Edward, who completed a doctorate in law and worked as a notary in Czarny Dunajec.

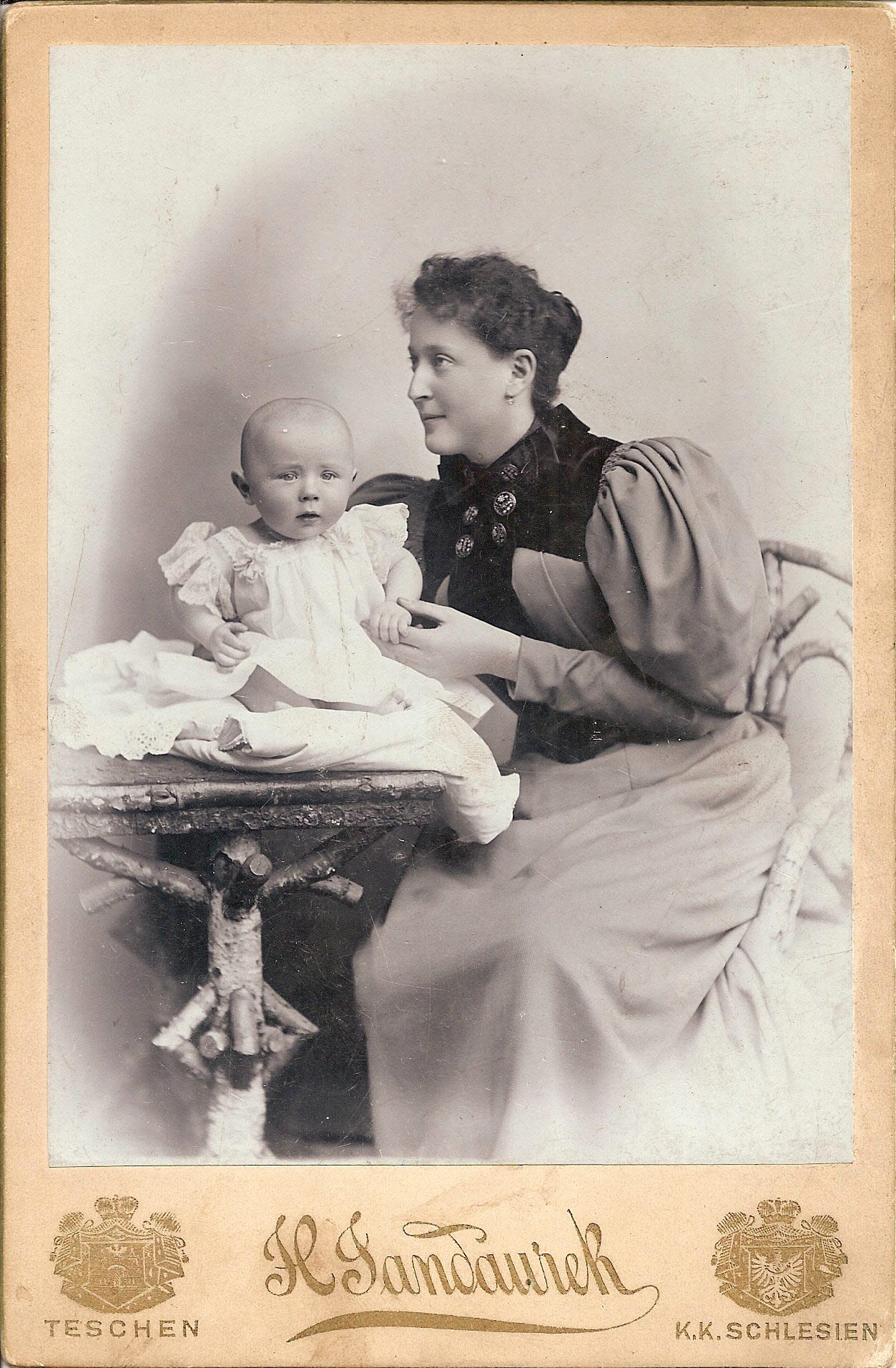
Alicja Kusionowicz nee Matter, wife of Andrzej, with son Stanisław

The only son of Alicja and Andrzej, Stanisław Sylwester Alfonzy, was born on 4 November 1898 in Jabłonków (now in the Czech Republic). As with his father and half-brother Bogusław, church records show that Stanisław's surname was changed from Kusionowicz to Grodyński on 7 September 1906. Following military service, during which he was wounded, then law studies at universities in Kraków and Poznań, at the age of twenty-eight Stanisław "reputedly" became Poland's youngest Starost at the time. After assignments in Kobryń (now in Belarus), Sarny, Świecie, Toruń, Stanisławów and Kałusz (now in Ukraine) Stanisław was appointed Starost in Grudziądz prior to World War II and before his subsequent deportation with his wife and two young sons to a Soviet labour camp near Aldan in the Yakutsk region of Siberia.

Following Andrzej's passing, Alicja moved from the family home, which she had shared with Andrzej and Stanisław at 34 Bielska street (formerly Bielitzerstrasse), to 7 Stanisława Wyspiańskiego street (formerly Lenaugasse), accompanied by her loyal friend (Stanisław's former 'nanny') Jadwiga Szczypka. Alicja died in Cieszyn in 1964 and is buried alongside Andrzej in grave number XIV-63.

== Bibliography ==
- Powstanie chochołowskie w roku 1846 ... 1904 book on the 1846 Chochołów Uprising by dr Stanisław Eljasz Radzikowski (Polskie Towarzystwo Nakładow) noting SK as trainee organist and uncle as priest on page 115
- Gimnazyum Św Jacka w Krakowie, za rok szkolny 1883 ... (Nakładem Funduszu Naukowego) refer page 86
- Gwiazdka Cieszyńska ... 1889 - 1890 periodicals via the Silesian Digital Library noting AK as editor (12 January 1989 to 7 June 1890, 42#2-43#23)
- Dziennik Cieszyński ... edition of 6 November 1910 (V#253-Supplement) ... Cieszyn "Falcon" Napisał JG
- Poseł Związek Śląskich Katolików 1891... (Nakładem Towarzystwa Katolicko-politycznego dla Księstwa Cieszyńskiego) refer page 58 (AM, AK)
- Gwiazdka Cieszyńska ... edition of 13 June 1896 (49#24) recording the marriage of AK and AM in Cieszyn Parish Church
- Gwiazdka Cieszyńska ... edition of 12 November 1904 (43#23) noting joint contribution to new school of dr AK and ks Oskar Zawisza
- Gwiazdka Cieszyńska ... edition of 29 January 1908 (61#9) article praising the manner in which dr AG discharged his judicial duties and aided the poor and orphans
- Pięciolecie Sądownictwa Polskiego Na Śląsku 1922-1927 ... book by Jan Handzel with AG featured on final page with photo
- Dziennik Śląska Cieszyńskiego ... editions of 26, 30 July 1925 (XXII#161/152-3, 163/159,161) containing AG obituary, funeral and tribute details
- Gwiazdka Cieszyńska ... editions of 28, 31 July 1925 (78#58/224, 59/227) noting further AG details and account of funeral procession
- Sędziowie w II Rzeczypospolitej ... 2011 book by Lech Krzyżanowski (Published by University of Silesia) noting AG on pages 83, 250, 346
- Górnoślązaków żywoty równoległe (Parallel life stories of Upper Silesians) ... 2012 book by Muzeum Śląskie (Published by Museum of Silesia) refer pages 52–69
- The Grodyński Brigade (Brygadą Grodyńskawo) ... 2012 book by Andrzej ST Grodyński (Published by Amazon/CreateSpace) noting AG on pages 3–17 with biography of Stanisław on pages 47–77

== Kusionowicz renaming notes ==
- Józef Grodyński (Notary) Reskryptem nos L 12195 12.VIII.1893 and L 80451 10.X.1893 Kraków (Milówka-Niepołomice) [14.03.1849-28.07.1922 b Dębno d Kraków]

 Aniela Grodyńska (née Federowicz)  [10.08.1862-21.07.1937 Kraków]
 Jerzy Grodyński (Engineer-Architect/Co-founder Polish Scouting/Commander Defence of Lwów)  [20.04.1883-28.12.1918 k Lwów g Kraków]
 Tadeusz Grodyński (dr/Administrator)  [01.10.1886-1920 Kraków]
 Janina Grodyńska  (m Marchwicki)  [1888-19.05.1946 Kraków]
 Jan Kanty Grodyński (Military Officer)  [03.10.1889-21.03.1934 d Przemyśl g Kraków]

- Władysław Grodyński (Kraków Chief Magistrate) Namiestnictwa 9/XI/1893 #88839 - #33399/46 Kraków [08.11.1859-28.04.1939 b Gdów d Kraków]

 Zophia Grodyńska (née Doening)  [1866-08.04.1927 Kraków]
 Elżbieta Grodyńska  (m Grzymała Grudziński)  [05.06.1886-30.07.1925 Kraków]
 Edward Grodyński (dr/Notary/Judge)  [11.10.1887-15.09.1959 d Polanica-Zdrój g Kraków]
 Janina Grodyńska  (m Joseph Tomaszewski h Bończa)  [31.10.1888-08.05.1953 Kraków]

- Andrzej Grodyński (dr/Circuit Judge) 7.IX.1906 Zl.26.681 19.XII.1906 Z.35.105 (Opawa 26681 / Bielsko-Biała "lost") Silesian Government 14/1907 N 4289-X [22.10.1861-24.07.1925 b Gdów d Cieszyn]

 Alicja Grodyńska (née Matter)  [28.09.1878-11.03.1964 Cieszyn]
 Bogusław Grodyński (Cavalry Officer)  [19.08.1892-14.07.1922 b Cieszyn d Kraków]
 Stanisław Grodyński (District Governor/Army Captain)  [04.11.1898-27.08.1971 b Jabłonków d London]

Footnote: From family research and anecdotal evidence it has been postulated by Andrzej’s great grandson, Stan Grodyński, that Andrzej’s father Sylwester, raised in Czchów by parents Egidius “Idzi” and Marianna (née Karnikiewicz) Kusionowicz, may have been the illegitimate son of Bogusław Horodyński. Given the legal and administrative backgrounds of Andrzej and his brothers Józef and Wladisław, the change of surname adopted by all members of their families would have been fully considered; the similar spelling and pronunctiation of the two names is unlikely to have been a coincidence and may have been the closet legally acceptable at that time given the nobility of the Horodyński Family (h Korczak). {See Grodyński Family Tree and Postulated Horodyński-Grodyński Lineage with further details in image 'description'.}
