= Świątniki Dolne =

- Village
- Location within Poland
- Coordinates: 49°59′N 20°16′E
- Country: Poland
- Voivodeship: Lesser Poland
- County: Wieliczka
- Gmina: Gdów

Świątniki Dolne (Polish pronunciation: [ɕfjɔntˈɲikʲi ˈdɔlnɛ]) is a village in the administrative district of Gmina Gdów, within Wieliczka County, Lesser Poland Voivodeship, in southern Poland.
