= Stryszowa =

- Village
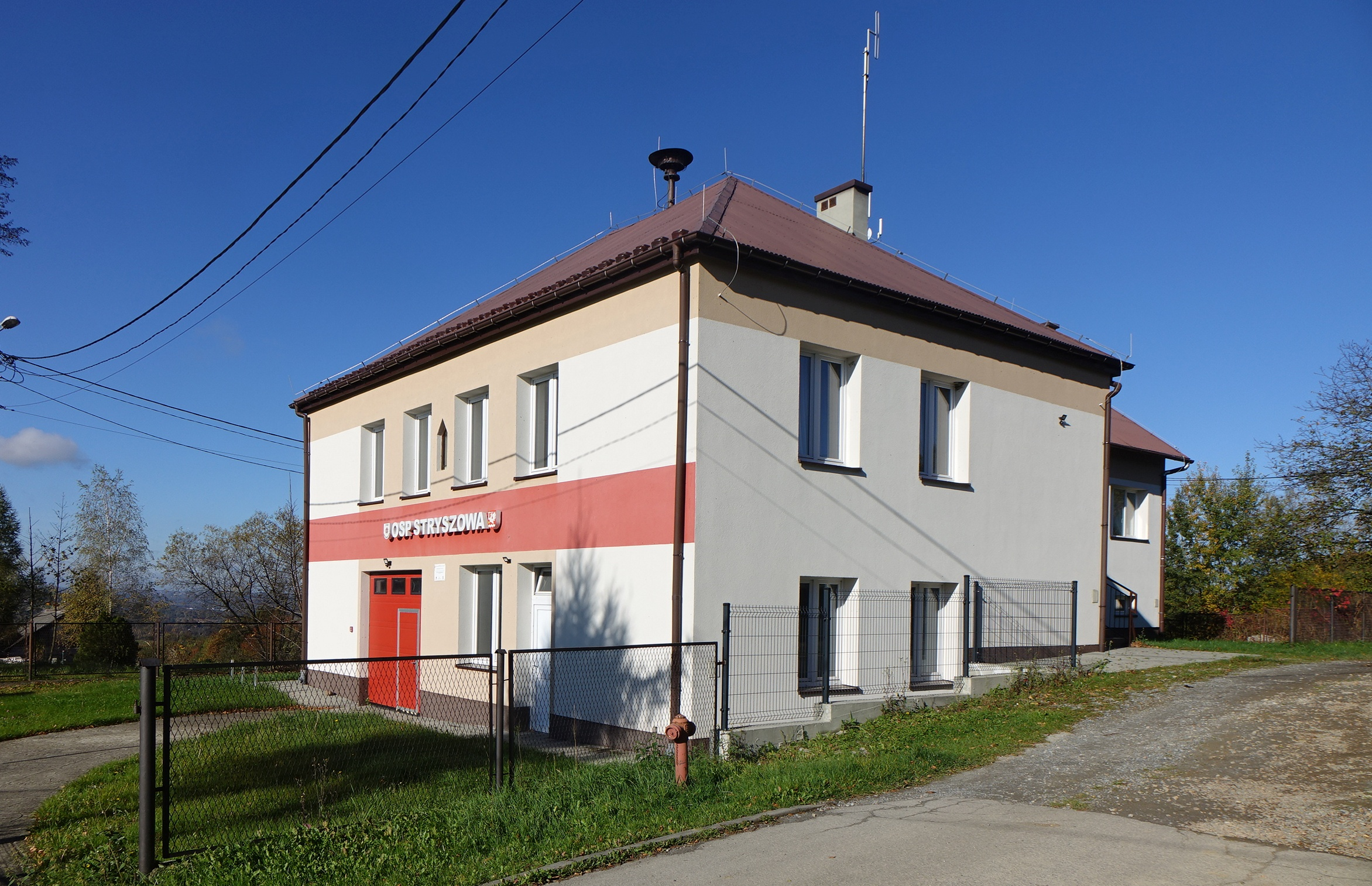
- Fire station

- Location within Poland
- Coordinates: 49°53′N 20°12′E
- Country: Poland
- Voivodeship: Lesser Poland
- County: Wieliczka
- Gmina: Gdów
- Elevation: 355 m (1,165 ft)
- Population: 250

Stryszowa [strɨˈʂɔva] is a village in the administrative district of Gmina Gdów, within Wieliczka County, Lesser Poland Voivodeship, in southern Poland.
