= Jaroszówka, Lesser Poland Voivodeship =

Jaroszówka
- Village
- Location within Poland
- Coordinates: 49°54′14″N 20°16′27″E
- Country: Poland
- Voivodeship: Lesser Poland
- County: Wieliczka
- Gmina: Gdów

Jaroszówka [jarɔˈʂufka] is a village in the administrative district of Gmina Gdów, within Wieliczka County, Lesser Poland Voivodeship, in southern Poland.
