= Czyżów, Wieliczka County =

Czyżów
- Village
- Location within Poland
- Coordinates: 49°58′47″N 20°12′57″E
- Country: Poland
- Voivodeship: Lesser Poland
- County: Wieliczka
- Gmina: Gdów

Czyżów [ˈt͡ʂɨʐuf] is a village in the administrative district of Gmina Gdów, within Wieliczka County, Lesser Poland Voivodeship, in southern Poland.
