= Szczytniki, Wieliczka County =

Szczytniki
- Village
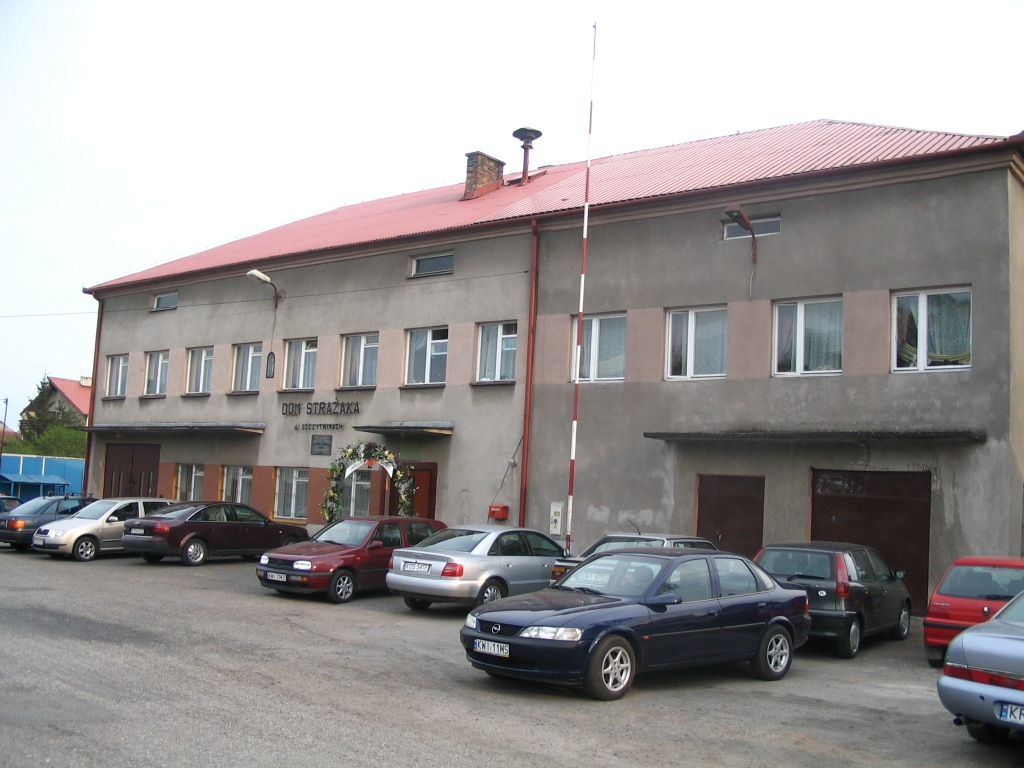
- Fire station

- Location within Poland
- Coordinates: 49°58′N 20°14′E
- Country: Poland
- Voivodeship: Lesser Poland
- County: Wieliczka
- Gmina: Gdów

Szczytniki [ʂt͡ʂɨtˈniki] is a village in the administrative district of Gmina Gdów, within Wieliczka County, Lesser Poland Voivodeship, in southern Poland.
