= Wieniec =

Wieniec may refer to:

- Wieniec, Lesser Poland Voivodeship (south Poland)
- Wieniec, Mogilno County in Kuyavian-Pomeranian Voivodeship (north-central Poland)
- Wieniec, Włocławek County in Kuyavian-Pomeranian Voivodeship (north-central Poland)
- Wieniec, Masovian Voivodeship (east-central Poland)
