= Hucisko, Wieliczka County =

Hucisko
- Village
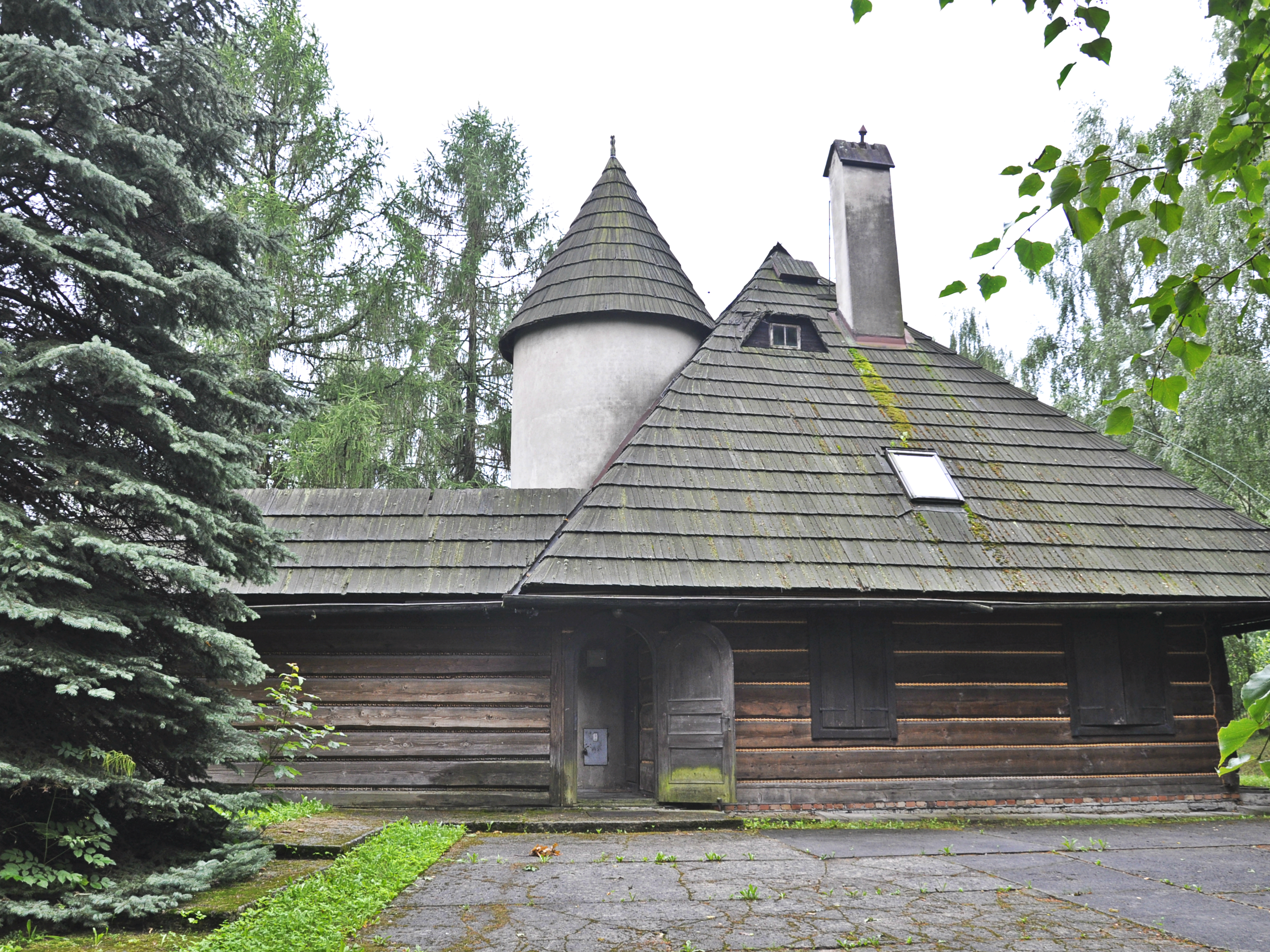

- Location within Poland
- Coordinates: 49°55′24″N 20°7′6″E
- Country: Poland
- Voivodeship: Lesser Poland
- County: Wieliczka
- Gmina: Gdów

Hucisko [xuˈt͡ɕiskɔ] is a village in the administrative district of Gmina Gdów, within Wieliczka County, Lesser Poland Voivodeship, in southern Poland.

== Notable sites ==
Tadeusz Kantor house - an original, wooden house, designed by Polish artists, Tadeusz Kantor.

Monument of A Chair - a permanent concrete installation from the "Impossible Monuments" series by Tadeusz Kantor. Erected posthumously in 1995 by Tadeusz Kantor Foundation.

A 1813 palace - listed in Registry of Objects of Cultural Heritage.

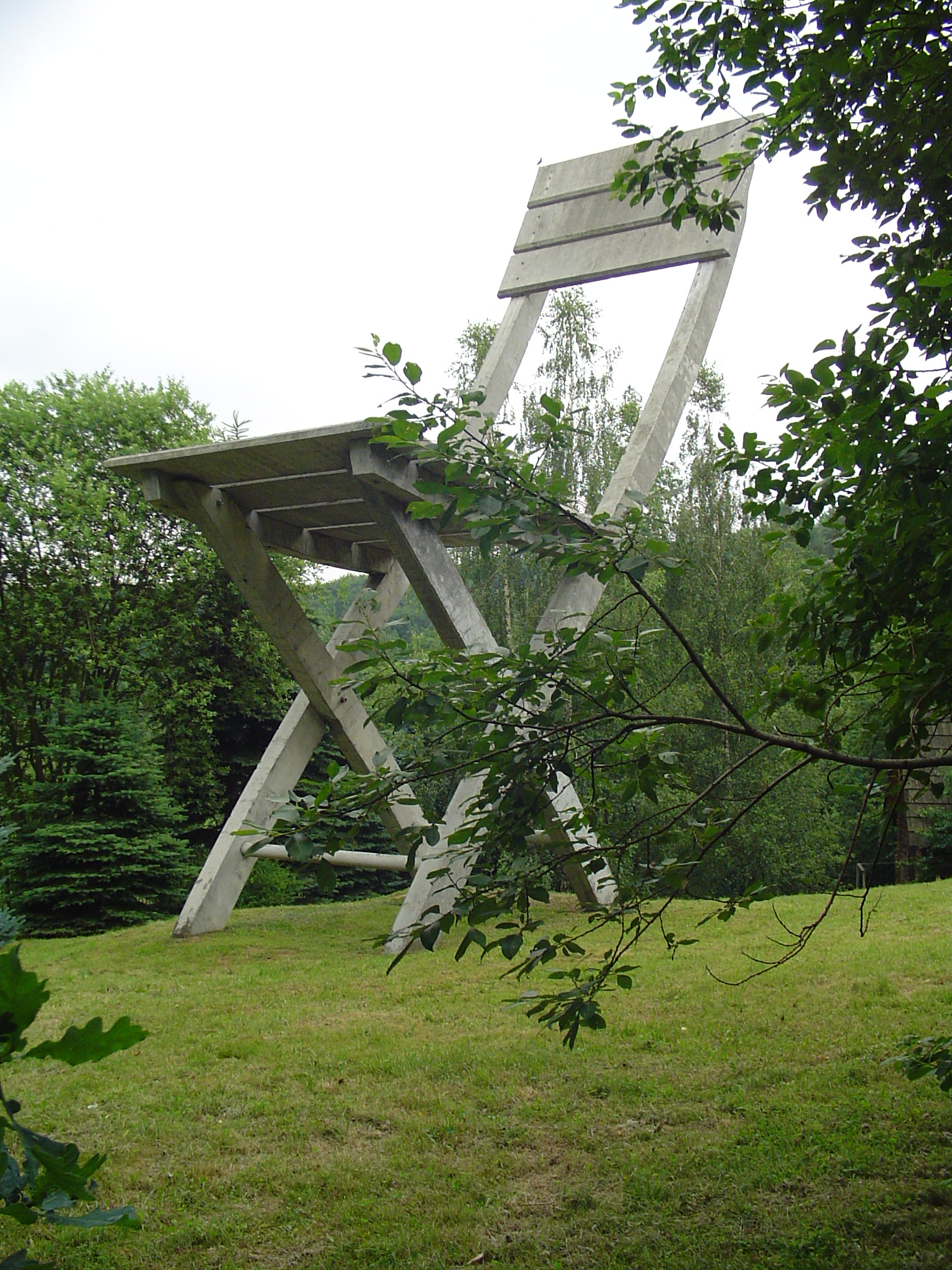
Monument of a Chair, designed by Tadeusz Kantor, erected posthumously, 1995
