= Niegowić =

- Village
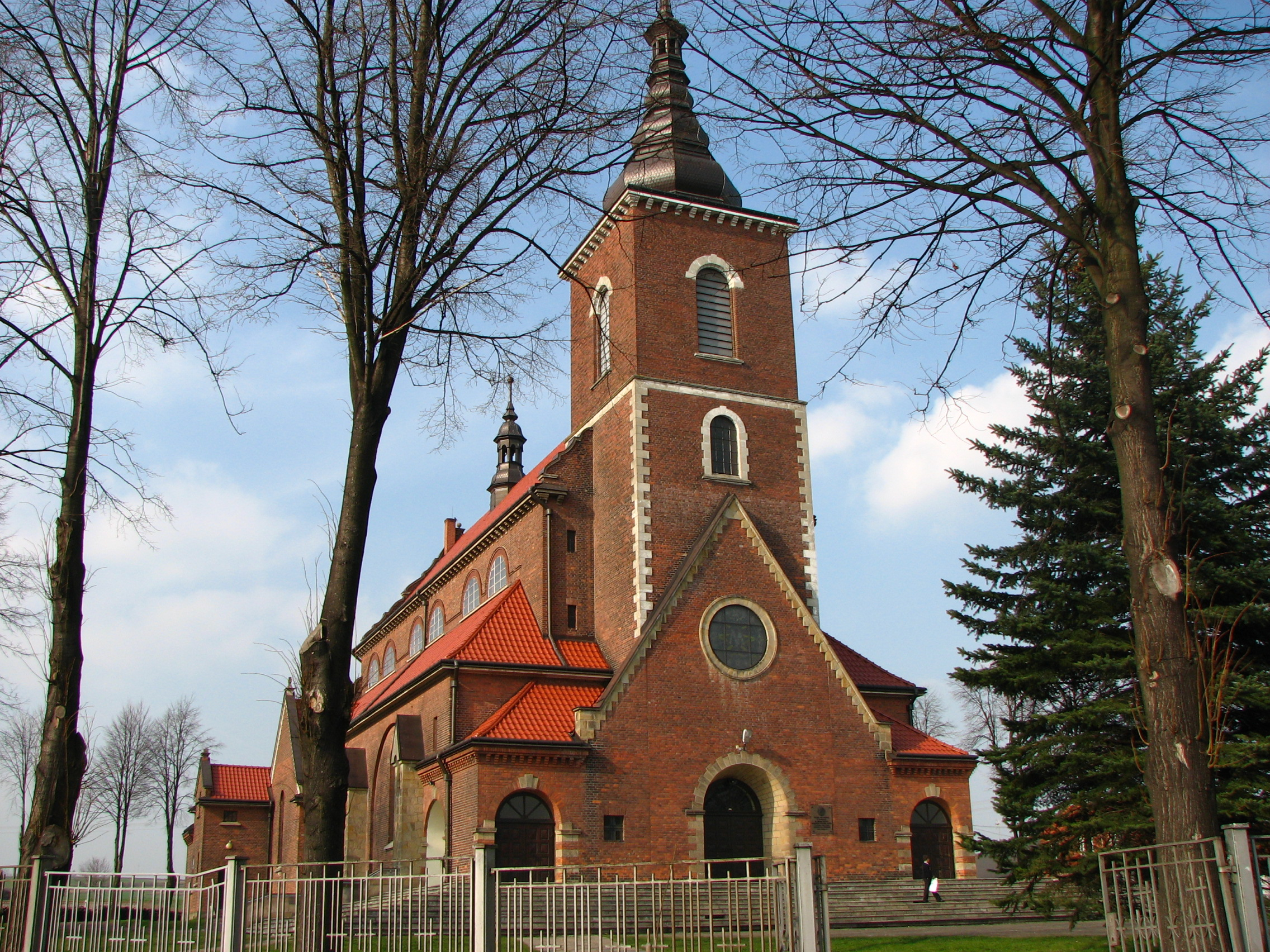
- A local Catholic church

- Location within Poland
- Coordinates: 49°56′N 20°13′E
- Country: Poland
- Voivodeship: Lesser Poland
- County: Wieliczka
- Gmina: Gdów
- Website: http://www.niegowic.pl

Niegowić [ɲɛˈɡɔvit͡ɕ] is a village in the administrative district of Gmina Gdów, within Wieliczka County, Lesser Poland Voivodeship, in southern Poland.

Niegowić was the place of the first appointment of Karol Wojtyła, the future Pope John Paul II, as its parish church's, Church of the Assumption of Our Lady, priest. He served there from July 1948 to August 1949, before the then-Cardinal and Krakow Archbishop Adam Sapieha (who had ordained Wojtyła a priest in 1946 on an accelerated schedule, sending him to work on a doctorate in theology in Rome before beginning parish work), assigned him to work at St. Florian's Church in Kraków (where he began his work with university students as a chaplain to students of the Jagiellonian University and the Catholic University of Lublin). While he was at the parish, the then-pastor Sapieha celebrated the fiftieth anniversary of his presbyteral ordination. It was Father Wojtyła who suggested that as a present, the parish arrange to build a new church, which was eventually done, the first built at his suggestion.
