= Książnice, Lesser Poland Voivodeship =

Książnice
- Village
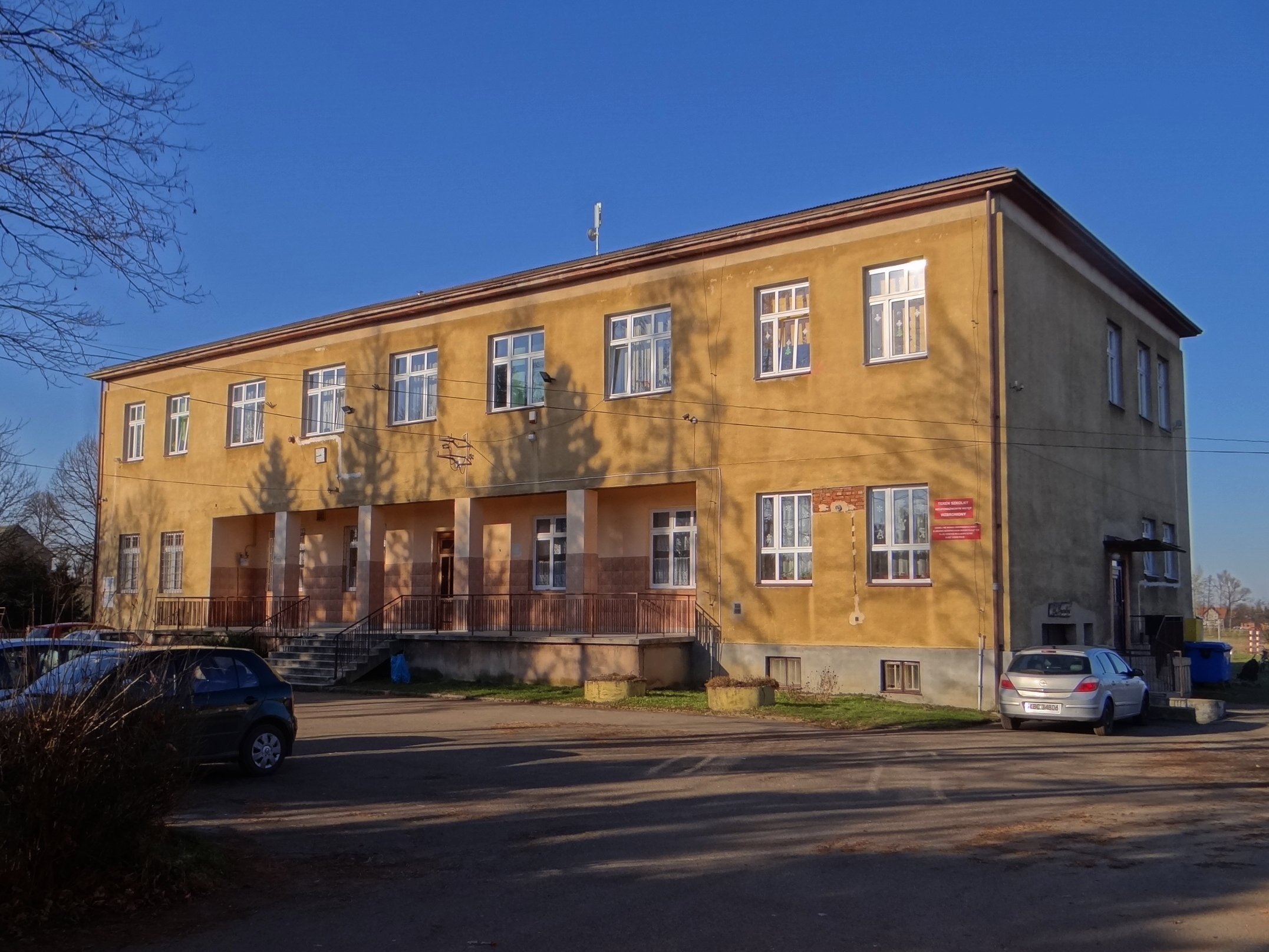
- School

- Location within Poland
- Coordinates: 49°57′N 20°19′E
- Country: Poland
- Voivodeship: Lesser Poland
- County: Wieliczka
- Gmina: Gdów
- Population: 736

Książnice [kɕɔ̃ʐˈnit͡sɛ] is a village in the administrative district of Gmina Gdów, within Wieliczka County, Lesser Poland Voivodeship, in southern Poland.
