= Kunice, Lesser Poland Voivodeship =

Kunice
- Village
- Location within Poland
- Coordinates: 49°54′N 20°9′E
- Country: Poland
- Voivodeship: Lesser Poland
- County: Wieliczka
- Gmina: Gdów

Kunice [kuˈnit͡sɛ] is a village in the administrative district of Gmina Gdów, within Wieliczka County, Lesser Poland Voivodeship, in southern Poland.
