= Liplas =

- Village
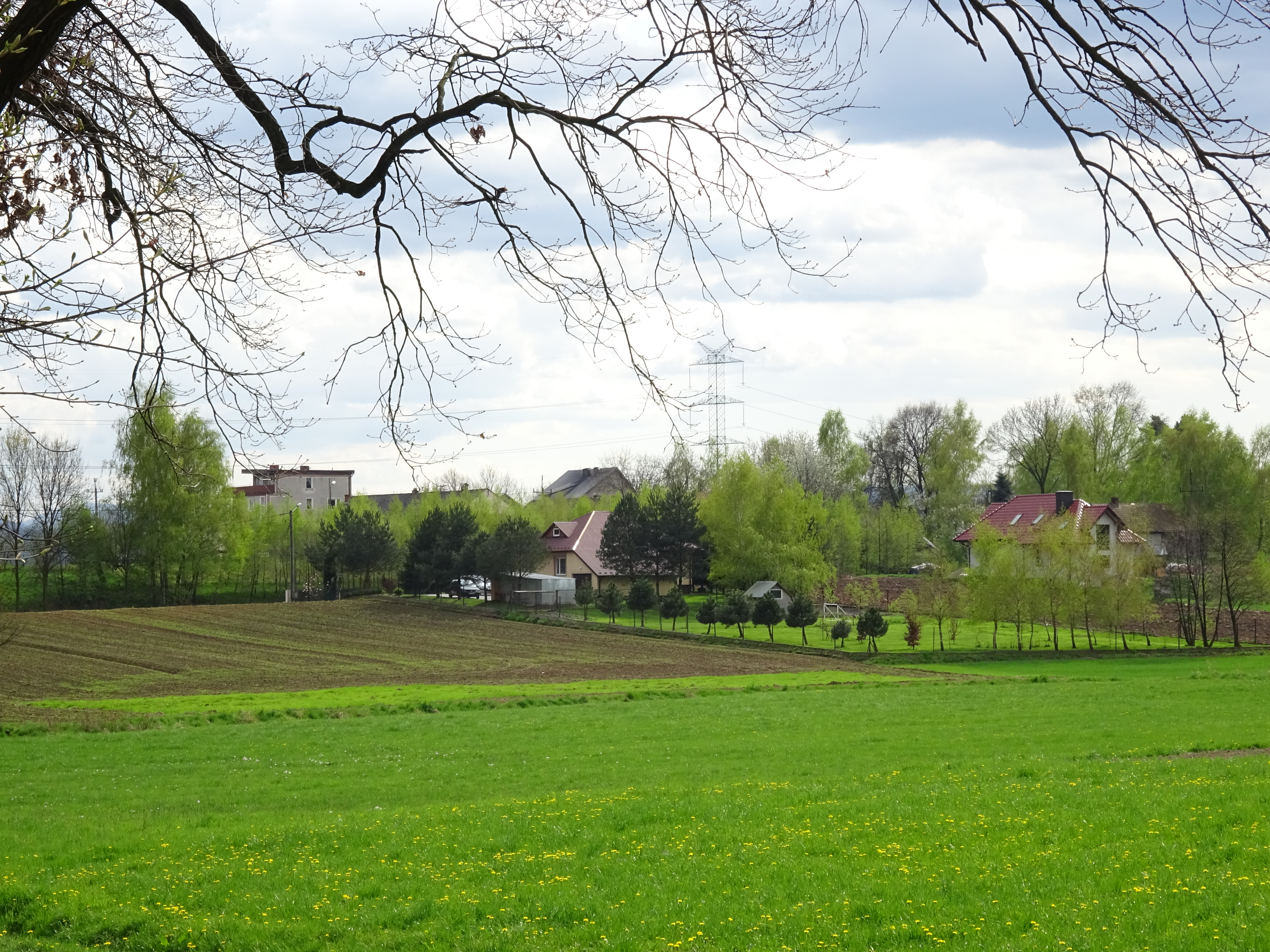

- Location within Poland
- Coordinates: 49°57′N 20°13′E
- Country: Poland
- Voivodeship: Lesser Poland
- County: Wieliczka
- Gmina: Gdów
- Website: http://www.liplas.info

Liplas [ˈliplas] is a village in the administrative district of Gmina Gdów, within Wieliczka County, Lesser Poland Voivodeship, in southern Poland.
