= Klęczana =

- Village
- Location within Poland
- Coordinates: 49°53′52″N 20°15′27″E
- Country: Poland
- Voivodeship: Lesser Poland
- County: Wieliczka
- Gmina: Gdów

Klęczana [klɛnˈt͡ʂana] is a village in the administrative district of Gmina Gdów, within Wieliczka County, Lesser Poland Voivodeship, in southern Poland.
