= Zagórzany, Wieliczka County =

Zagórzany
- Village
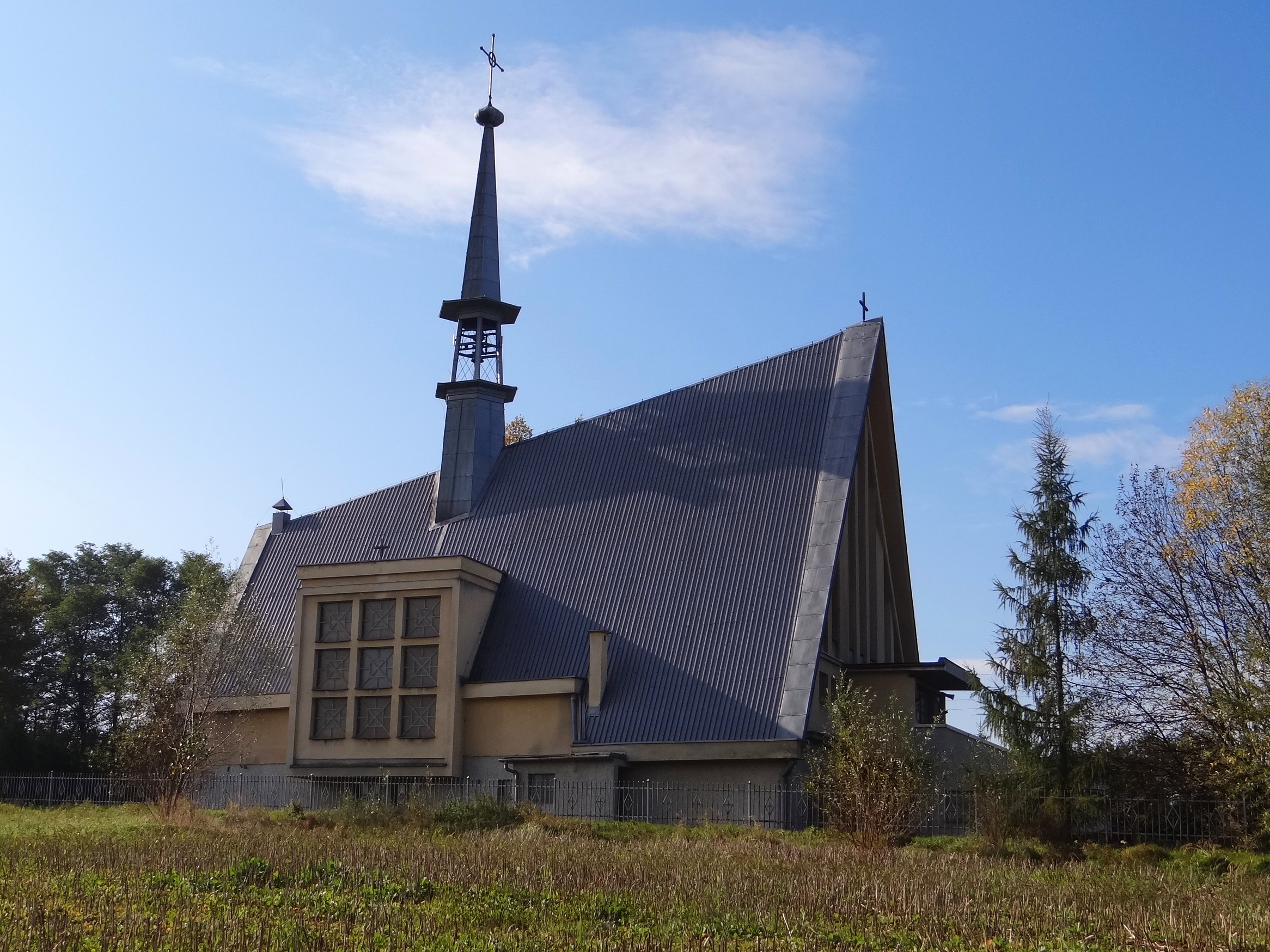
- Church in the village

- Location within Poland
- Coordinates: 49°53′N 20°15′E
- Country: Poland
- Voivodeship: Lesser Poland
- County: Wieliczka
- Gmina: Gdów

Population (approx.)
  - Total: 600

Zagórzany [zaɡuˈʐanɨ] is a village in the administrative district of Gmina Gdów, within Wieliczka County, Lesser Poland Voivodeship, in southern Poland.

The village has an approximate population of 600.
