= Krakuszowice =

- Village
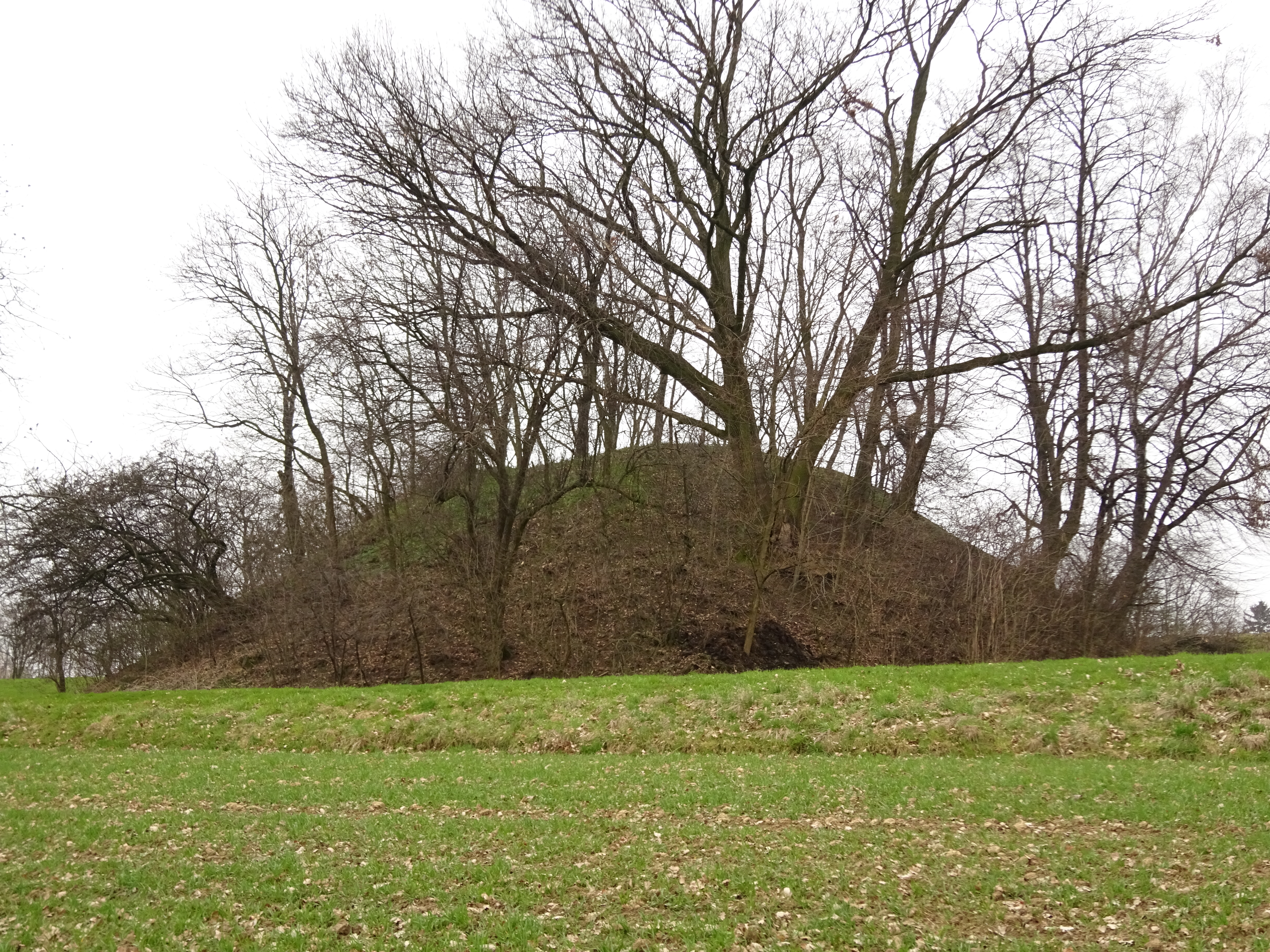
- Mound

- Location within Poland
- Coordinates: 49°58′N 20°15′E
- Country: Poland
- Voivodeship: Lesser Poland
- County: Wieliczka
- Gmina: Gdów
- Elevation: 111 m (364 ft)

Krakuszowice [krakuʂɔˈvit͡sɛ] is a village in the administrative district of Gmina Gdów, within Wieliczka County, Lesser Poland Voivodeship, in southern Poland.
