= Winiary, Wieliczka County =

Winiary
- Village
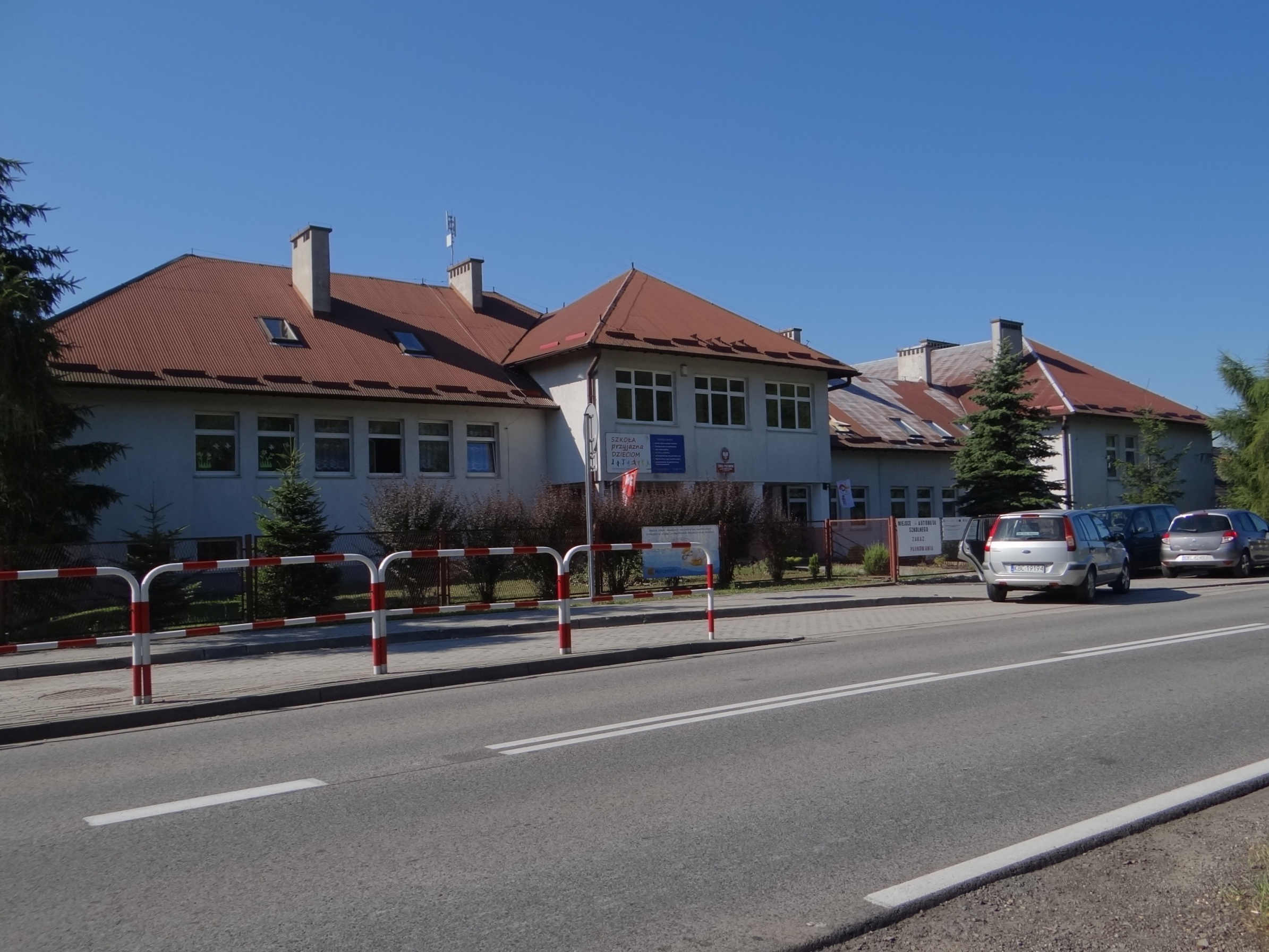
- School

- Location within Poland
- Coordinates: 49°55′N 20°9′E
- Country: Poland
- Voivodeship: Lesser Poland
- County: Wieliczka
- Gmina: Gdów

Winiary [viˈɲarɨ] is a village in the administrative district of Gmina Gdów, within Wieliczka County, Lesser Poland Voivodeship, in southern Poland.
