= Zręczyce =

- Village
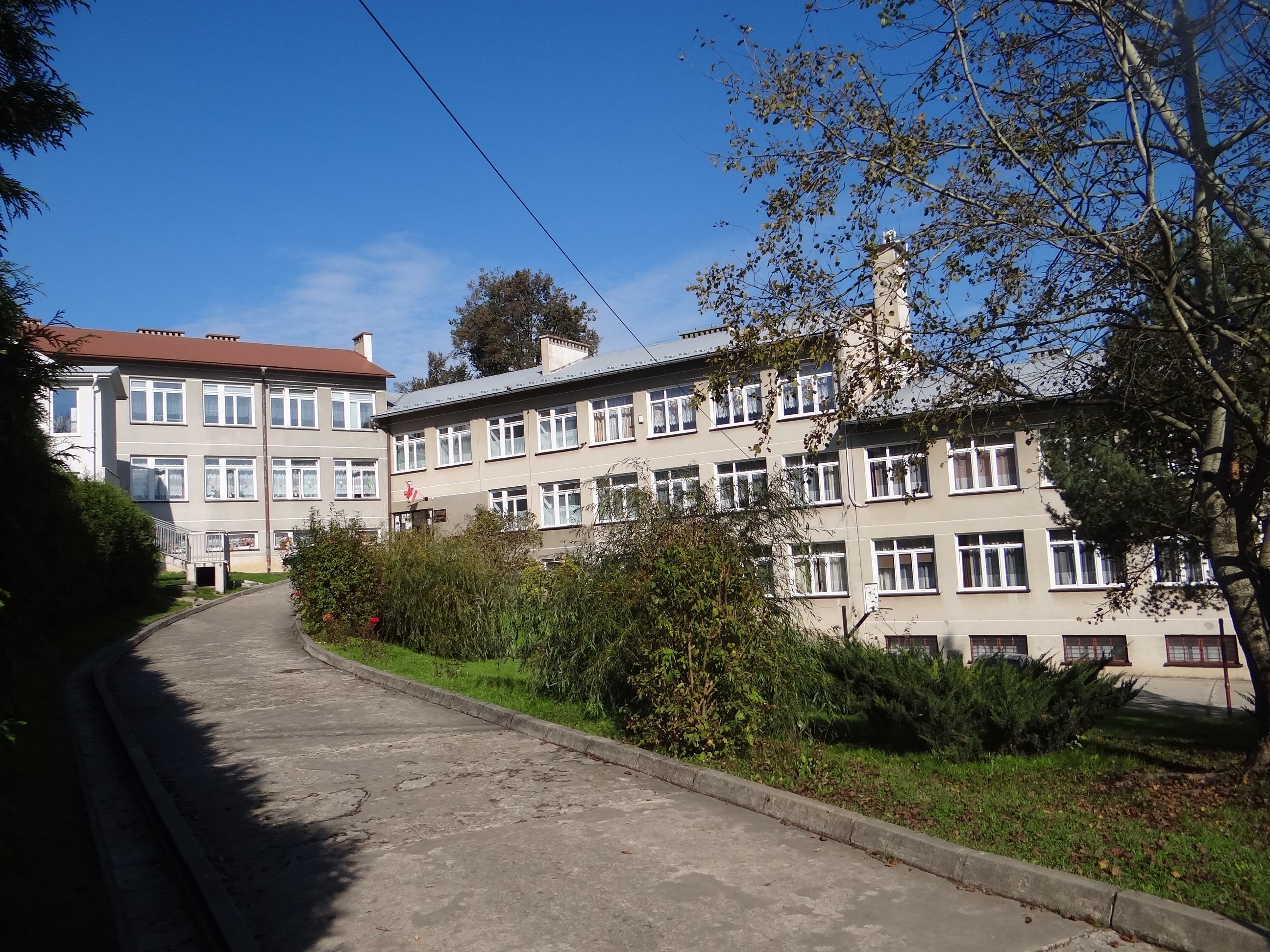
- School

- Location within Poland
- Coordinates: 49°54′N 20°13′E
- Country: Poland
- Voivodeship: Lesser Poland
- County: Wieliczka
- Gmina: Gdów

Zręczyce [zrɛnˈt͡ʂɨt͡sɛ] is a village in the administrative district of Gmina Gdów, within Wieliczka County, Lesser Poland Voivodeship, in southern Poland.
