= Podolany, Wieliczka County =

Podolany
- Village
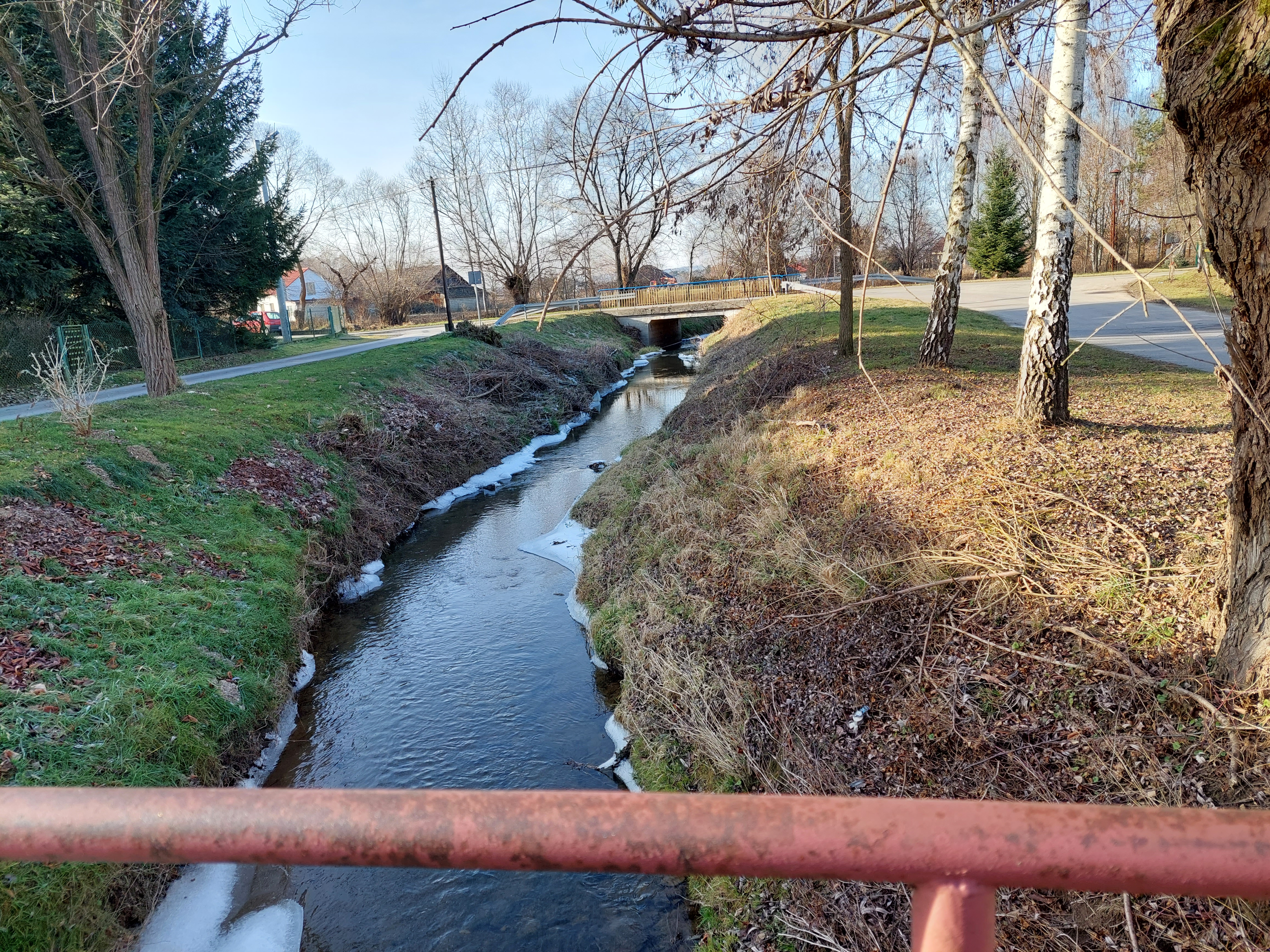

- Location within Poland
- Coordinates: 49°53′44″N 20°14′6″E
- Country: Poland
- Voivodeship: Lesser Poland
- County: Wieliczka
- Gmina: Gdów
- Population: 170

Podolany [pɔdɔˈlanɨ] is a village in the administrative district of Gmina Gdów, within Wieliczka County, Lesser Poland Voivodeship, in southern Poland.
