= Niżowa =

- Village
- Location within Poland
- Coordinates: 49°56′N 20°9′E
- Country: Poland
- Voivodeship: Lesser Poland
- County: Wieliczka
- Gmina: Gdów
- Population: 186

Niżowa [niˈʐɔva] is a village in the administrative district of Gmina Gdów, within Wieliczka County, Lesser Poland Voivodeship, in southern Poland.
