= Zalesiany, Lesser Poland Voivodeship =

Zalesiany
- Village
- Location within Poland
- Coordinates: 49°52′28″N 20°13′06″E
- Country: Poland
- Voivodeship: Lesser Poland
- County: Wieliczka
- Gmina: Gdów

Zalesiany [zalɛˈɕanɨ] is a village in the administrative district of Gmina Gdów, within Wieliczka County, Lesser Poland Voivodeship, in southern Poland.
