= Fałkowice, Lesser Poland Voivodeship =

Fałkowice
- Village
- Location within Poland
- Coordinates: 49°54′01″N 20°10′15″E
- Country: Poland
- Voivodeship: Lesser Poland
- County: Wieliczka
- Gmina: Gdów

Fałkowice [fau̯kɔˈvit͡sɛ] is a village in the administrative district of Gmina Gdów, within Wieliczka County, Lesser Poland Voivodeship, in southern Poland.
