= Bilczyce =

- Village
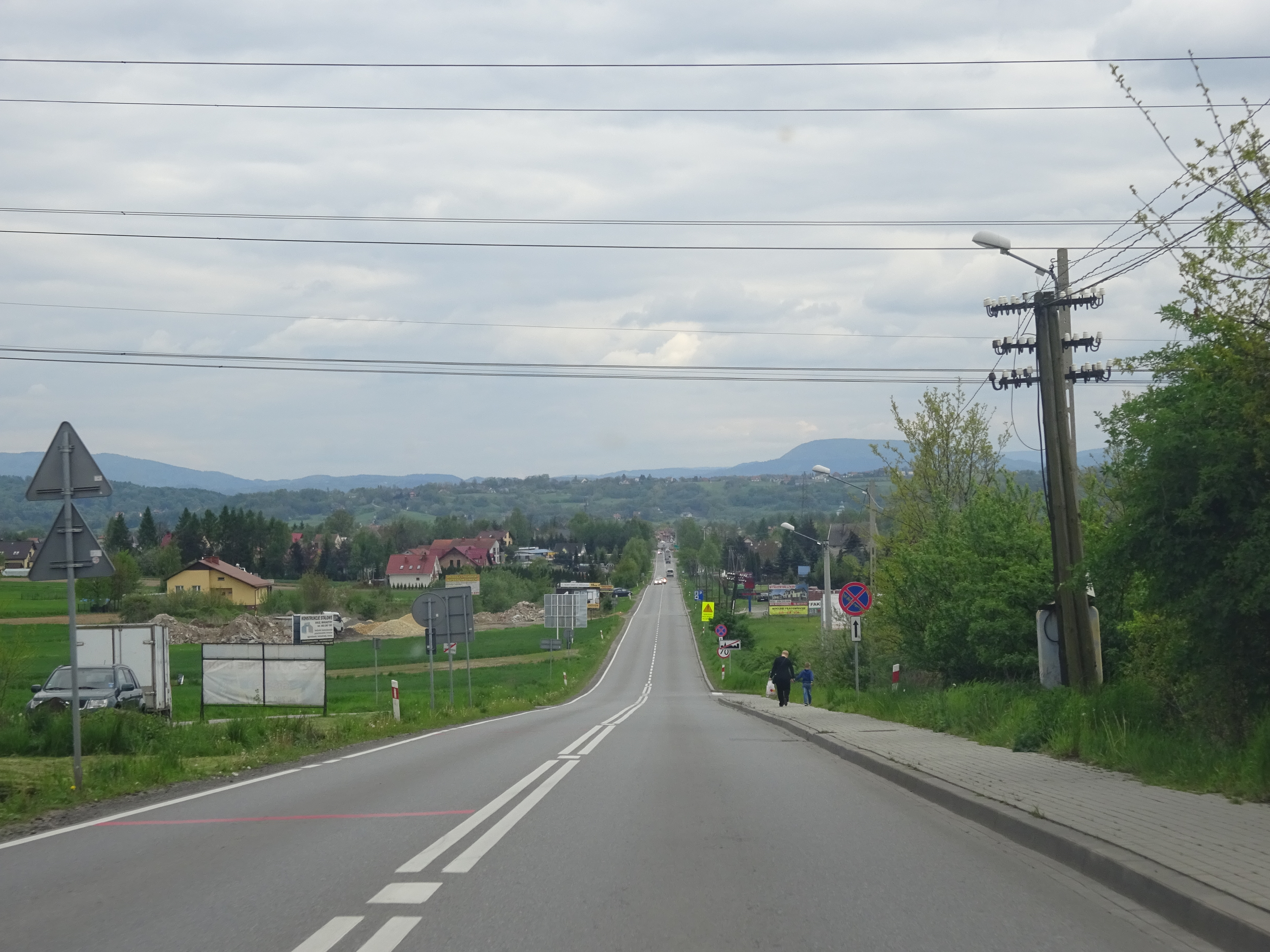

- Location within Poland
- Coordinates: 49°57′N 20°11′E
- Country: Poland
- Voivodeship: Lesser Poland
- County: Wieliczka
- Gmina: Gdów
- Elevation: 280 m (920 ft)
- Population: 1,003

Bilczyce [bilˈt͡ʂɨt͡sɛ] is a village in the administrative district of Gmina Gdów, within Wieliczka County, Lesser Poland Voivodeship, in southern Poland.
