= Śląska Biblioteka Cyfrowa =

The Silesian Digital Library (Polish: Śląska Biblioteka Cyfrowa (ŚBC); Silesian: Sylezyjsko Bibliōtyka Cyfrowo), abbreviated as SDL – a digital library co-created by various institutions representing the area of culture, education and science in the historical Silesia and the Silesian Voivodeship, Poland.

== Overview ==
The Silesian Digital Library is divided into collections: Bibliophile collection, Cultural heritage, Educational and Scientific Materials, Miscellanea and Regional. The collections present cultural heritage of the region, national, European and world cultural heritage collected in the region, scientific publications, educational and teaching materials, and other contributed by participating institutions.

The Silesian Digital Library is included in the national system of digital libraries, and therefore also enables direct access to materials published in other regional and institutional digital libraries. Descriptions of publications of the Silesian Digital Library are indexed and can be searched by global search engines. The SDL offers 5 language versions of the user interface: Polish, English, German, French and Czech.

== Organization ==
Digital content of the Silesian Digital Library is created distributively by each participating institution of the SDL. Participants publish on equal rights and each of them decides autonomously which publications and how many of them will be published. Resources published in the SDL are available to non-commercial users free of charge. Conditions of commercial use of the SDL materials depend on the decision of copyright owners of digital publications. Each Participant takes responsibility for solving the problem of copyright, making sure the rights are terminated or concluding an agreement with an owner of the rights.

The organizational coordinator of the SDL is the Silesian Library in Katowice. The SDL content and its main infrastructure is situated in the Silesian Library which supports the SDL domains, provides the Internet connection and administers its system.

== History ==
The Silesian Digital Library (SDL) was initiated by the founding Agreement between the Silesian Library in Katowice and the University of Silesia signed on July 20, 2006 by Prof. Janusz Janeczek (Rector of the University of Silesia) and Prof. Jan Malicki (Director of the Silesian Library). The aim of the agreement was to work out the principles of open participation of other institutions in the region.

Principles of co-creation of the SDL are regulated by the Agreement on co-creation of the Silesian Digital Library, which has been established together by all institutions declaring the participation in the SDL, on October 24, 2006. The agreement is open in its character and all institutions sharing its aims and representing the area of culture, education and science can participate in it. The official opening of the Silesian Digital Library took place on September 27, 2006 and was carried out by the Vice-Marshal of the Śląskie (Silesian) Voivodeship Sergiusz Karpiński.

== See also ==
- List of libraries in Poland
