= Gmina Gdów =

Gmina Gdów Gdów Commune
- Gmina
- Flag Coat of arms
- Interactive map of Gmina Gdów
- Coordinates (Gdów): 49°54′26″N 20°11′55″E
- Country: Poland
- Voivodeship: Lesser Poland
- County: Wieliczka
- Seat: Gdów

Area
  - Total: 108 km^{2} (42 sq mi)

Population (2006)
  - Total: 16,340
  - Density: 151/km^{2} (392/sq mi)
- Website: http://www.gdow.pl/

Gmina Gdów is a rural gmina (administrative district) in Wieliczka County, Lesser Poland Voivodeship, in southern Poland. Its seat is the village of Gdów, which lies approximately 14 kilometres (9 mi) south-east of Wieliczka and 26 km (16 mi) south-east of the regional capital Kraków.

The gmina covers an area of 108 square kilometres (41.7 sq mi), and as of 2006 its total population is 16,340.

== Neighbouring gminas ==
Gmina Gdów is bordered by the gminas of Bochnia, Dobczyce, Łapanów, Niepołomice, Raciechowice and Wieliczka.

== Villages ==
The gmina contains the following villages having the status of sołectwo: Bilczyce, Cichawa, Czyżów, Fałkowice, Gdów, Hucisko, Jaroszówka, Klęczana, Krakuszowice, Książnice, Kunice, Liplas, Marszowice, Niegowić, Niewiarów, Nieznanowice, Niżowa, Pierzchów, Podolany, Stryszowa, Świątniki Dolne, Szczytniki, Wiatowice, Wieniec, Winiary, Zagórzany, Zalesiany, Zborczyce and Zręczyce.
