= Pierzchów =

- Village
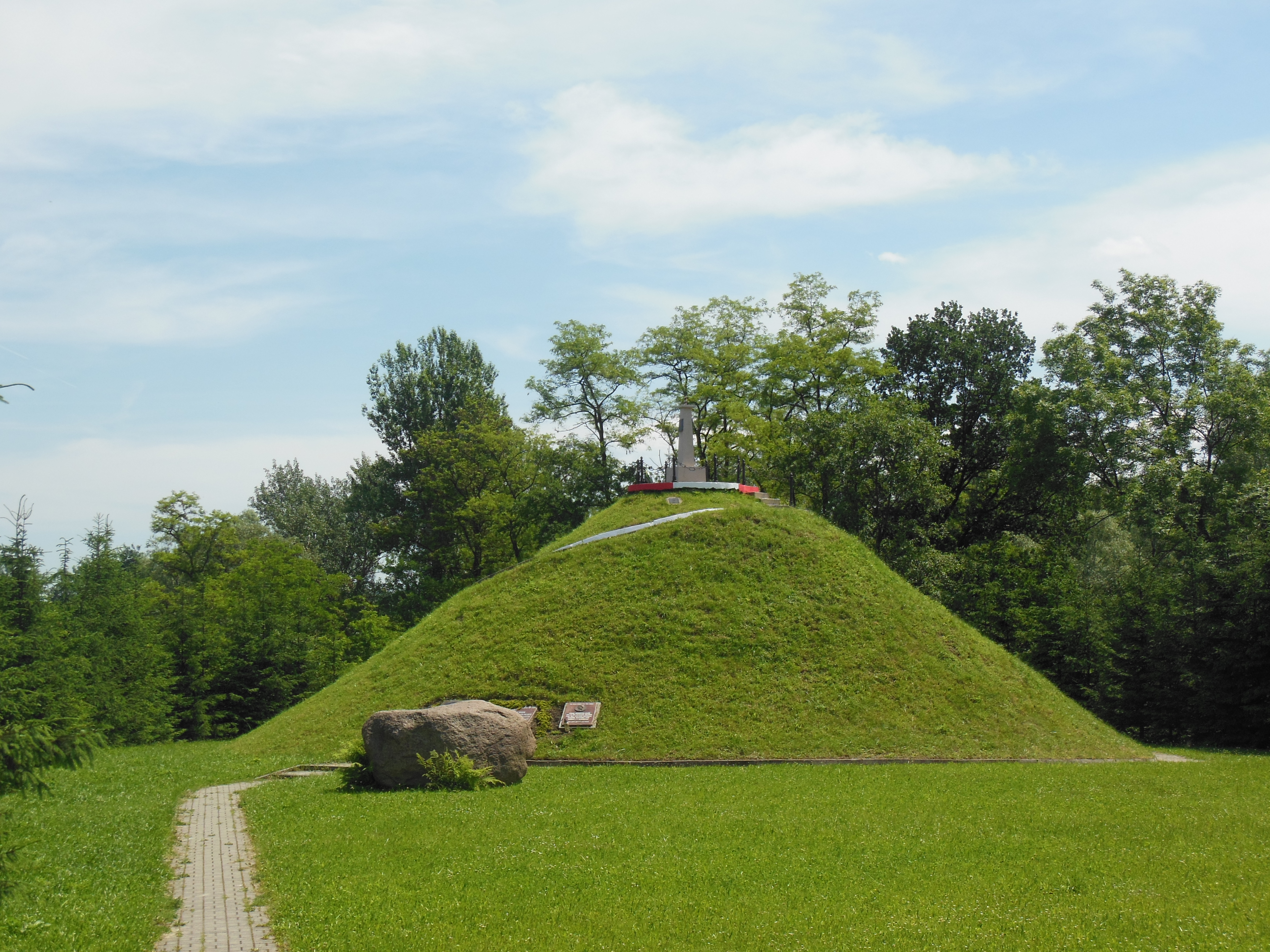
- Memorial mound of General Jan Henryk Dąbrowski

- Location within Poland
- Coordinates: 49°57′N 20°18′E
- Country: Poland
- Voivodeship: Lesser Poland
- County: Wieliczka
- Gmina: Gdów

Population
  - Total: 560

Pierzchów [ˈpjɛʂxuf] is a village in the administrative district of Gmina Gdów, within Wieliczka County, Lesser Poland Voivodeship, in southern Poland. General Jan Henryk Dąbrowski was born in Pierzchów.
