= Wieniec, Lesser Poland Voivodeship =

Wieniec
- Village
- Location within Poland
- Coordinates: 49°54′45″N 20°17′43″E
- Country: Poland
- Voivodeship: Lesser Poland
- County: Wieliczka
- Gmina: Gdów

Wieniec [ˈvjɛɲɛt͡s] is a village in the administrative district of Gmina Gdów, within Wieliczka County, Lesser Poland Voivodeship, in southern Poland.
