= Gdów =

- Village
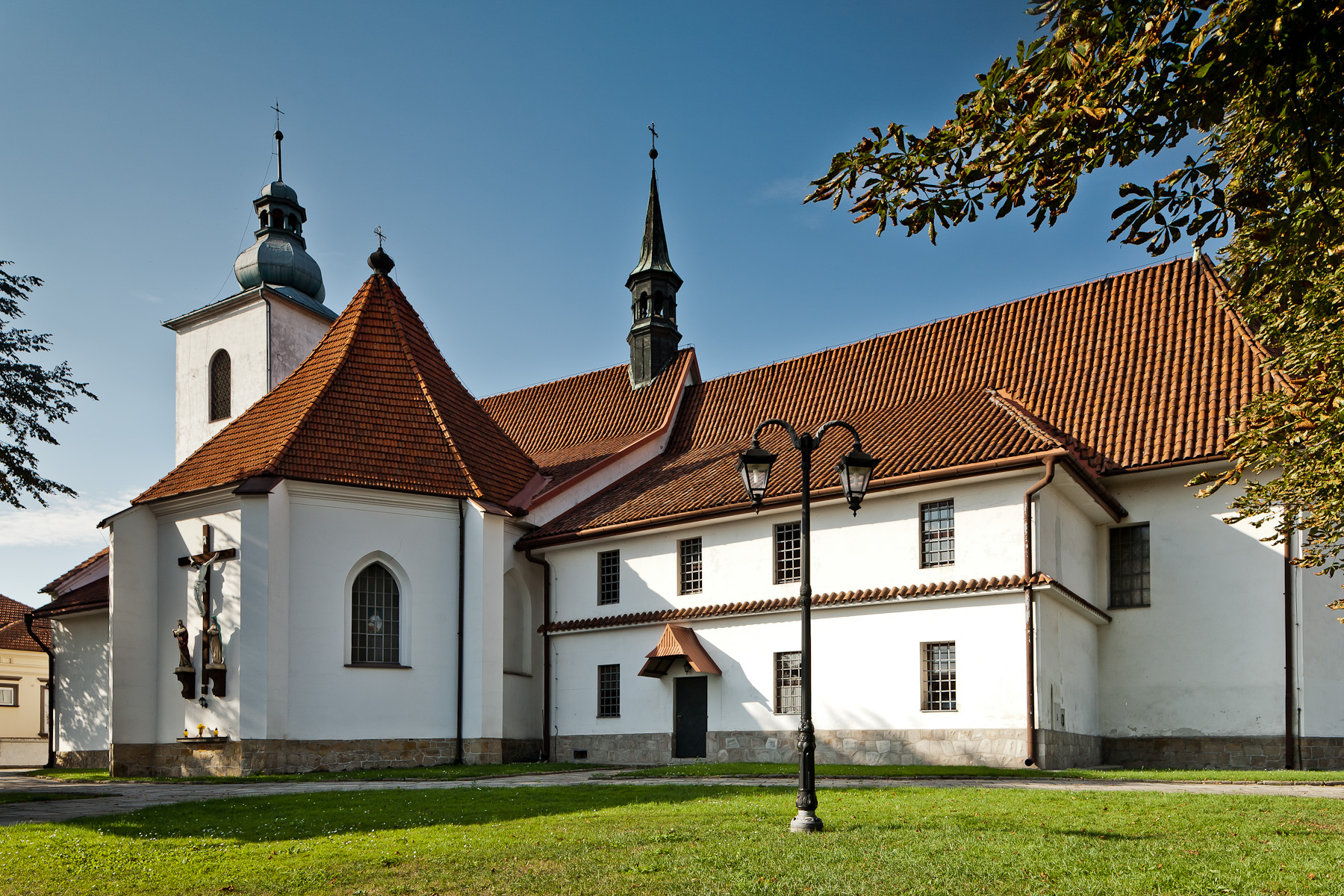
- Historic Church of the Nativity of the Virgin Mary in Gdów

- Location within Poland
- Coordinates: 49°54′26″N 20°11′55″E
- Country: Poland
- Voivodeship: Lesser Poland
- County: Wieliczka
- Gmina: Gdów
- Elevation: 220 m (720 ft)
- Population: 4,368
- Time zone: UTC+1 (CET)
  - Summer (DST): UTC+2 (CEST)
- Postal code: 32-420
- Vehicle registration: KWI
- Website: http://www.gdow.pl/

Gdów [ɡduf] is a village in Wieliczka County, Lesser Poland Voivodeship, in southern Poland. It is the seat of the gmina (administrative district) called Gmina Gdów.

== History ==
Archaeological excavations conducted in and around Gdów attest that settlements existed in the area in the Paleolithic, Neolithic and Bronze Ages.

From the records of Jan Długosz the first permanent settlement was founded in the eleventh century by the wealthy Gedko of Gryf coat of arms, who probably also founded the church. The church was reported for the first time in 1272 in a document that is the oldest document discovered to-date referencing Gdów. A major influence on the development of Gdów was its location at the crossroads of trade routes leading to Hungary and Austria, Kraków to Limanowa and Bochnia to Myślenice. Larger development of the settlement was hampered by the Raba river which often burst its banks.

Legend has it that in the early fifteenth century King Władysław III of Poland lost his way while heading for Niepołomice castle but was saved by the Lady of Gdów who pointed him in the correct direction. In 1444 King Władysław in appreciation granted a special dispensation to the church and Mary, and Gdów was transferred to Court Secretary Fihauser. In later years Gdów often changed owners, among them Stanislaw II (Wielopolski) and Nicholas II, with the last owners in the late seventeenth century being the Lubomirski family. King Augustus III of Poland granted Gdów the privilege of organizing four fairs each year and a weekly market effectively giving Gdów the status of a town.

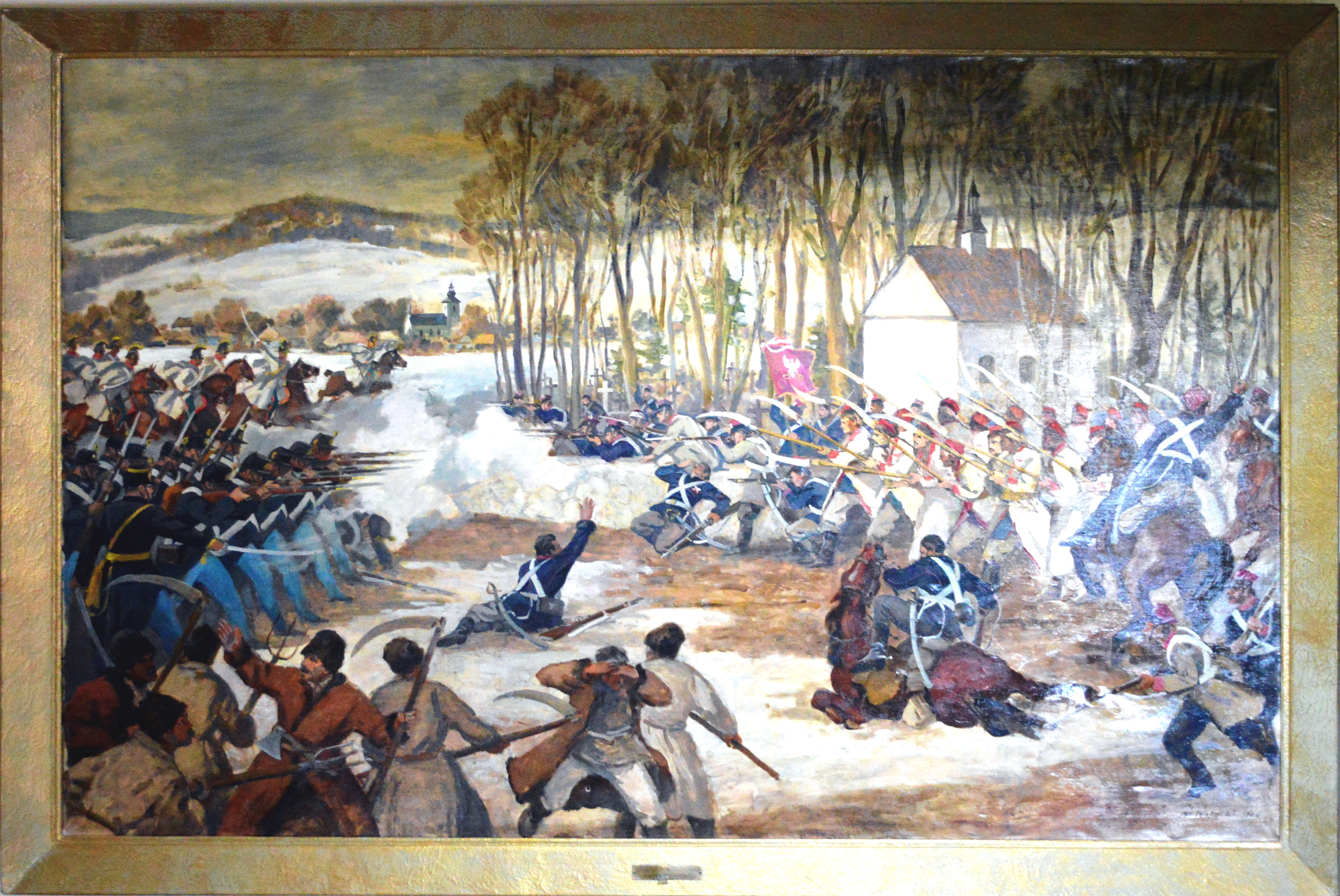
Battle of Gdów painting by Mieczysław Wątorski in the Gdów town hall

In 1772 the First Partition of Poland placed Gdów together with the lands situated on the right bank of the Vistula River under Austrian rule. Later, during the Kraków Uprising, an important battle took place on the outskirts of Gdów and adjacent to the local cemetery. The Battle of Gdów, chronicled by the local priest Ludwik Kusionowicz, took place on 26 February 1846. Austrian troops commanded by General Ludwig von Benedek and peasants from other regions encouraged by Austrian authorities easily defeated the Polish nationalist "insurgents" led by the absent Colonel Suchorzewski. Many were slaughtered in the aftermath of the fighting but a collective grave for 154 of the insurgents killed during the battle was subsequently created in the corner of the cemetery under a mound crowned with an impressive monument. The cemetery also contains the grave of Sylwester Kusionowicz, "nephew" of Ludwik, under a beautiful and evocative statue of the Virgin Mary, created by the master sculptor Edward Stehlik (pl), which poignantly looks out over the Gdów battlefield.

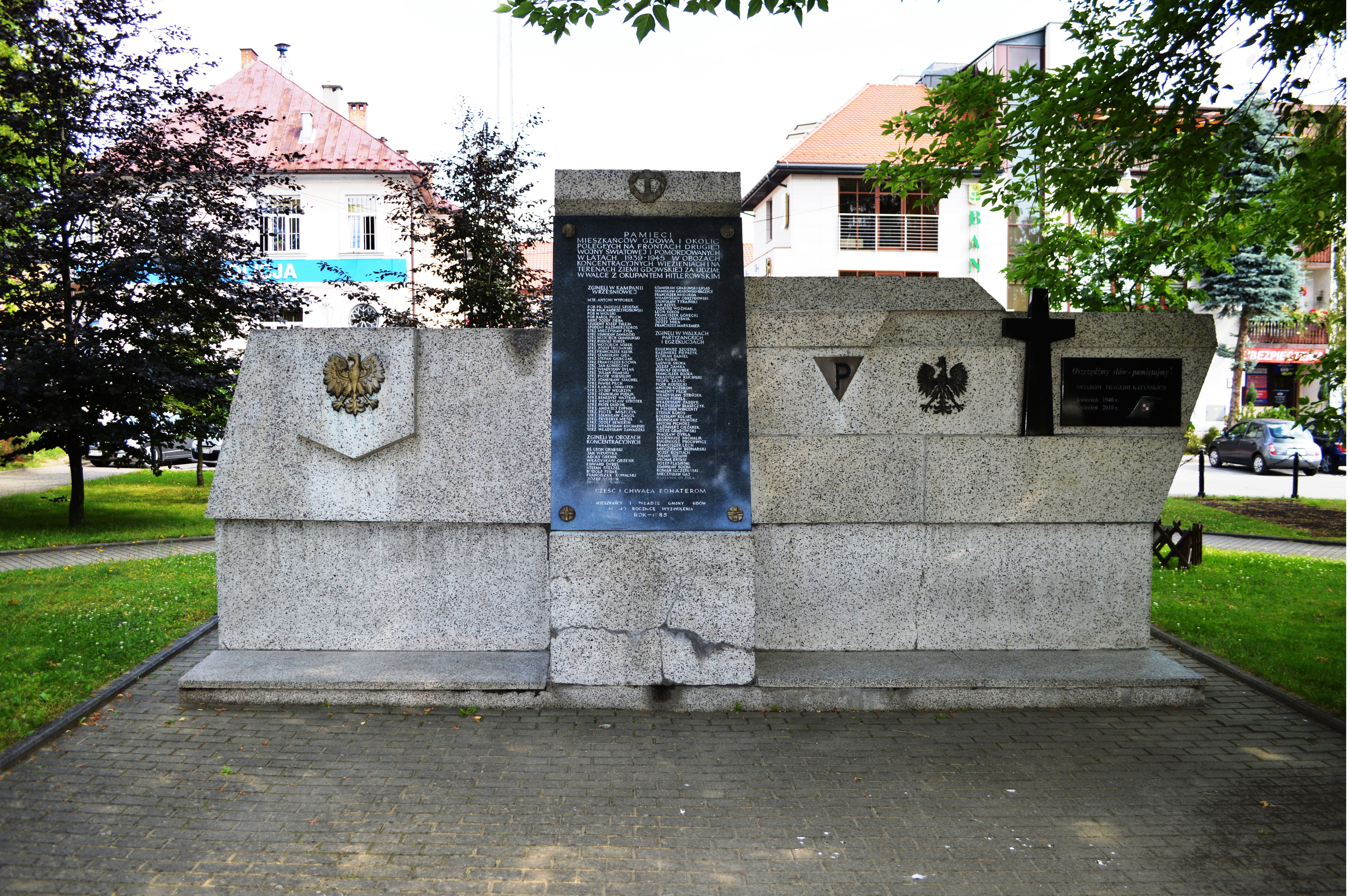
Memorial to local victims of Nazi Germany in World War II

After Poland regained its independence Gdów became the administrative centre for the local district lying within Wieliczka County. Following the German-Soviet invasion of Poland, which started World War II in September 1939, Gdów was occupied by Nazi Germany until 1945.

== Notable people ==
- Andrzej Kusionowicz Grodyński (1861–1925), President of the Silesian Court of Appeal, Polish circuit judge, secretary Cieszyn Education Society (pl), Polish lawyer, doctor of law, editor Gwiazdka Cieszyńska;
- Michał Grażyński (1890–1965), Governor of Silesia, independence and social activist, served in military and led scout movement, doctor of philosophy and law.
- Franciszek Jarecki (1931–2010), Polish Air Force pilot
