= Marszowice, Wieliczka County =

Marszowice
- Village
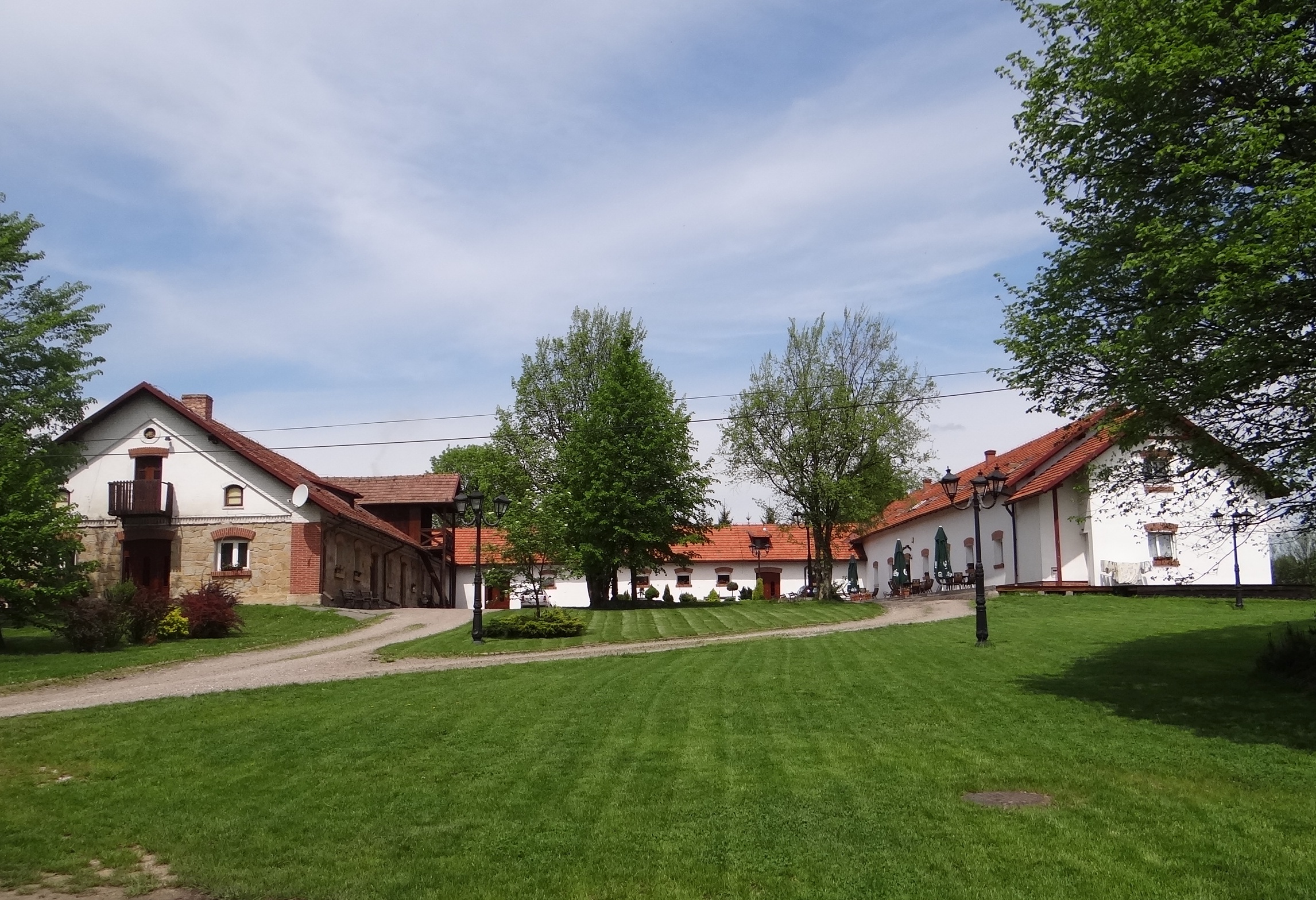

- Location within Poland
- Coordinates: 49°54′59″N 20°14′27″E
- Country: Poland
- Voivodeship: Lesser Poland
- County: Wieliczka
- Gmina: Gdów
- Highest elevation: 500 m (1,600 ft)
- Lowest elevation: 260 m (850 ft)

Population
  - Total: 800
- Time zone: UTC+1 (CET)
  - Summer (DST): UTC+2 (CEST)
- Vehicle registration: KWI

Marszowice [marʂɔˈvit͡sɛ] is a village in the administrative district of Gmina Gdów, within Wieliczka County, Lesser Poland Voivodeship, in southern Poland.
