= Silesian Library =

Coordinates: 50.2521°N 19.0315°E

- Biblioteka Śląska
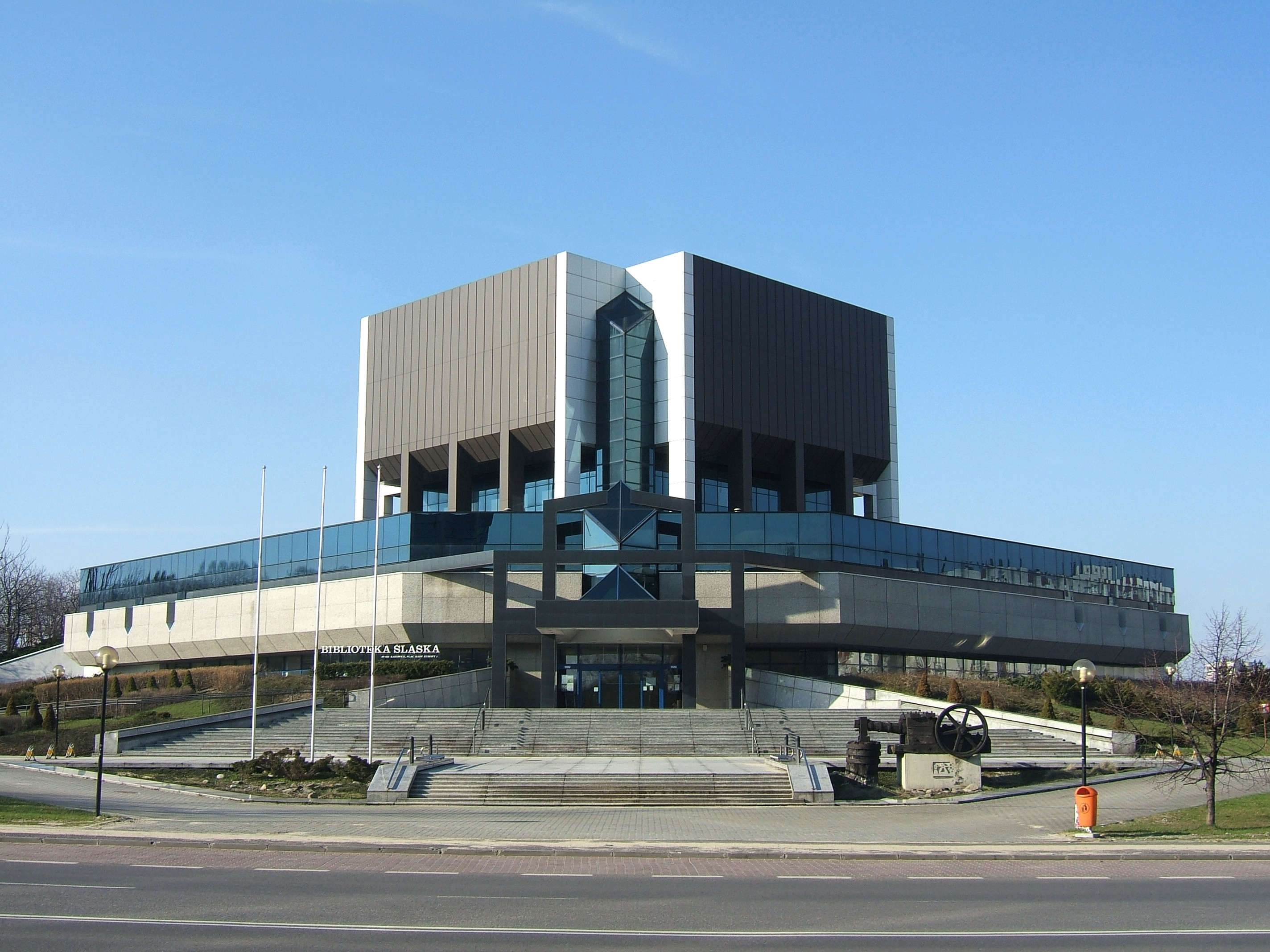
- Location: Plac Rady Europy 1, 40-021 Katowice, Silesian Voivodeship, Poland
- Established: 1922; 104 years ago

Collection
- Size: >2,600,000 volumes

Silesian Library (Polish: Biblioteka Śląska), is a library in Poland, located in the south-western city of Katowice, Silesia. The main building on Plac Rady Europy was opened in 1998.

== See also ==
- List of libraries in Poland
