= Ludwig von Benedek =

Austro-Hungarian general (1804–1881)

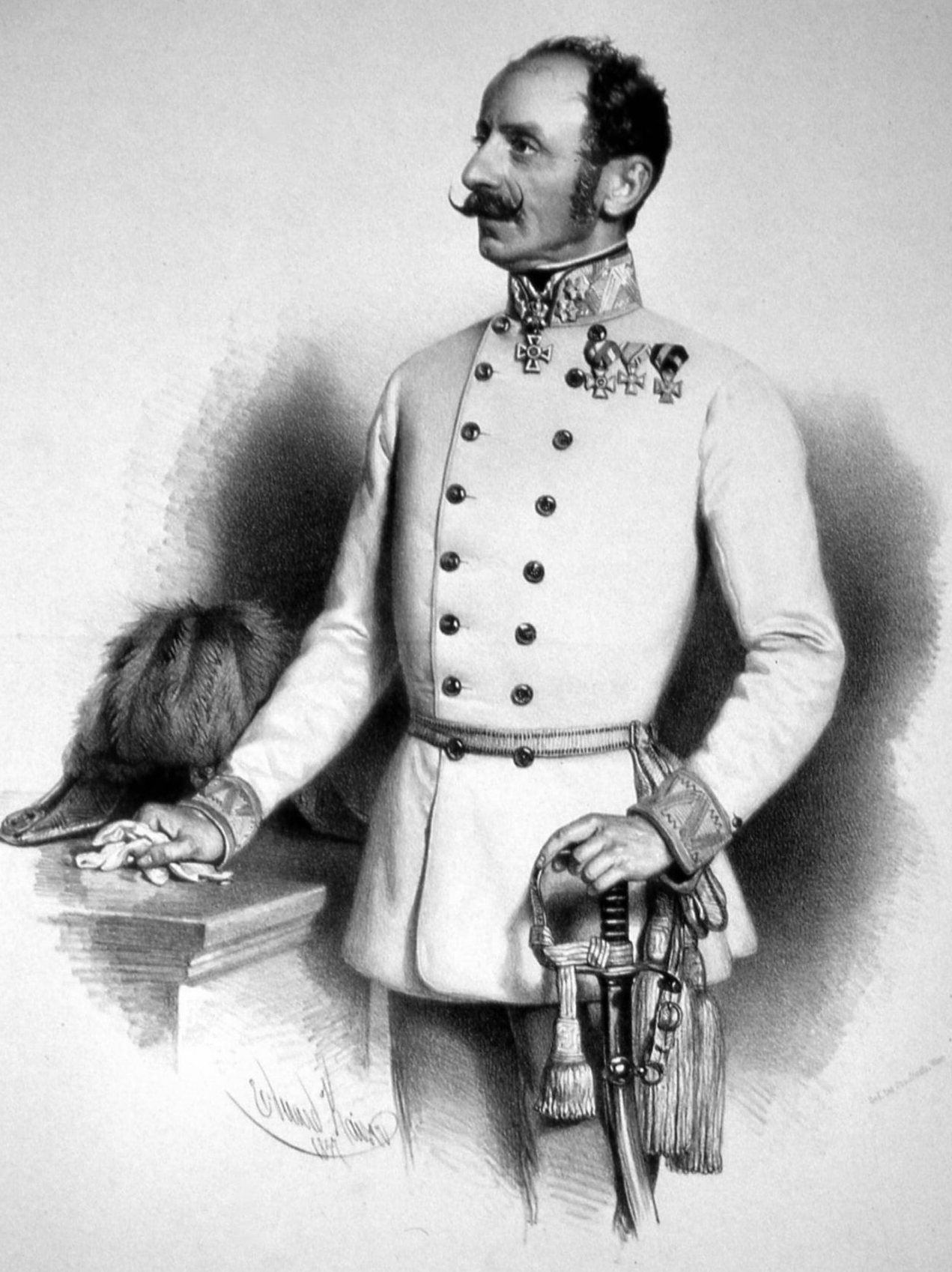
- Lithograph by Eduard Kaiser, 1857
- Born: 14 July 1804; Sopron, Kingdom of Hungary
- Died: 27 April 1881 (aged 76); Graz, Austria-Hungary
- Military career
- Allegiance: Austrian Empire
- Service years: 1822–1866
- Rank: Feldzeugmeister
- Conflicts: Kraków Uprising; Hungarian Revolution of 1848; First Italian War of Independence; Second Italian War of Independence; Austro-Prussian War
- Awards: Military Order of Maria Theresa

Ludwig August Ritter von Benedek (14 July 1804 – 27 April 1881), also known as Lajos Benedek, with the Hungarian form of Ludwig, was an Austro-Hungarian general (Feldzeugmeister), best known for commanding the imperial army in 1866 in their defeat at the Battle of Königgrätz against the Prussian Army, which ended his career.

== Early life ==
=== Early years ===
Benedek was born in Sopron as the son of a physician. He was trained at the Theresiana Military Academy in Wiener Neustadt, from which he graduated seventh in his class. In 1822, he was assigned to the 27th infantry regiment of the Austrian Imperial Army. He was made a first lieutenant in 1833, and was assigned to the Quartermaster-General. In 1835, he was promoted to the rank of captain.

In 1840 Benedek was made a major and aide to the General Commander of Galicia. While still serving in Galicia he was again promoted to lieutenant-colonel in 1843. For suppressing an uprising in the town of Gdow in 1846 he was awarded the Knight's Cross of the Order of Leopold as well as given the rank of colonel.

=== Commander in Italy ===
In August 1847, Benedek was entrusted with the command of the 33rd infantry regiment in Italy. On 5 April 1848 he took over the command of a newly formed brigade that consisted of two battalions. This brigade saw battle in the first Italian war of independence several times, notably at Curtatone in 1848. The following day, Benedek led his troops in the Battle of Goito.

Benedek was afterwards awarded the Commanders' Cross of the Order of Leopold, and the Knight's Cross of the Military Order of Maria Theresa. This officially made Benedek a knight (hence Ludwig, Ritter von Benedek). On 3 April 1849 he became major general and was appointed to the staff of the Chief of Quartermaster-General with the 2nd Army in Italy.

== Hungary and Italy ==
=== Hungarian revolution ===
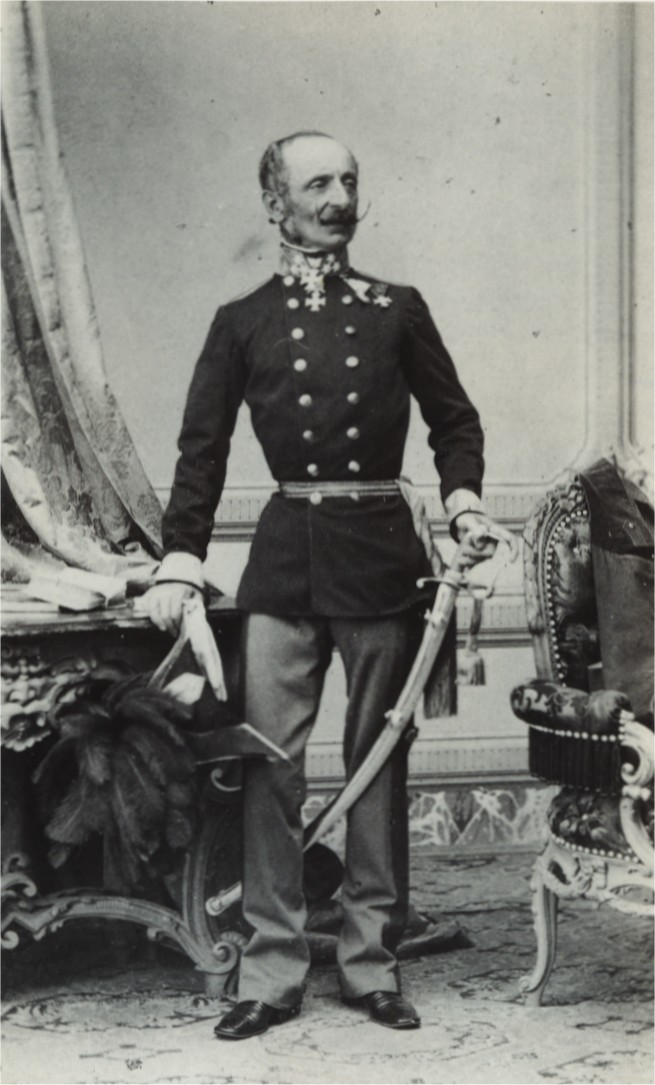
Ludwig Ritter von Benedek, 1860

In 1849, Benedek was sent to Hungary. Leading troops in the Battle of Győr, he was instrumental in striking down the rebellion. At another battle in Szőreg he was seriously wounded. He was given the Military Merit Cross and made regimental colonel. Benedek was made chief of staff to Radetzky in Italy.

He was promoted to Feldmarschallleutnant in 1852 and, when Radetzky retired in 1857, Benedek became the commander of the II Army Corps.

=== Battle of San Martino/Solferino ===
In early 1859, Benedek was commander general of the 8th army corps in the Second Italian War of Independence. On 27 May 1859, he was promoted to the rank of Feldzeugmeister, second in command of the entire Austrian Army. On 24 June, under the command of the young Emperor Franz Joseph I, he fought in the Battle of Solferino against the French troops of the Emperor Napoleon III.

Benedek was attacked on the right flank by the entire army of King Victor Emmanuel II of Piedmont-Sardinia, just a few kilometers north of Solferino in the Battle of San Martino. The Austrian units threw the Piedmontese back at first and were able to hold their ground until his troops were finally defeated at San Matino by the Piedmontese after multiple assaults and counter-assaults. In the meantime Franz Joseph was defeated at Solferino and Benedek aided his retreat. Benedek received the Commander's Cross of the Military Order of Maria Theresa in 1859.

After the Austrian defeat, Benedek was appointed Chief of the General Quartermaster Staff on 31 January 1860, and to the governorship of Hungary in April.

On 20 October 1860 Benedek assumed command of the Austrian forces in Lombardy-Venetia, Carinthia, Carniola, the Tyrol and the Adriatic Coastland and was awarded the Grand Cross of the Order of Leopold with War Decoration on 14 January 1862.

=== Military and political philosophy ===
Benedek was a staunch believer in the concept that the army was the chief guardian of the Habsburg monarchy and needed to protect it from liberal and nationalist forces; loyalty to the dynasty and monarch were paramount and suspicion of the civilian professional and business classes followed. In a circular to his officers in March 1861 he warned against "international revolutionaries, lawyers and doctors without practices, ambitious and money-hungry journalists, dissatisfied professors and schoolteachers" as well as "debt-ridden nobles and cowardly magnates" who threatened the monarchy. A year later he further stated in Verona that the army's purpose was "to serve, fight, and if necessary die with honor for the emperor and supreme warlord." Benedek believed in a traditional concept of war where valor and courage were of chief importance, where "simple rules" were superior to "complicated calculations". Following in this vein, he opposed the notion of a national, Prussian-style general staff of officers selected for their education and intellect.

== Austro-Prussian War ==
=== Battle of Königgrätz ===
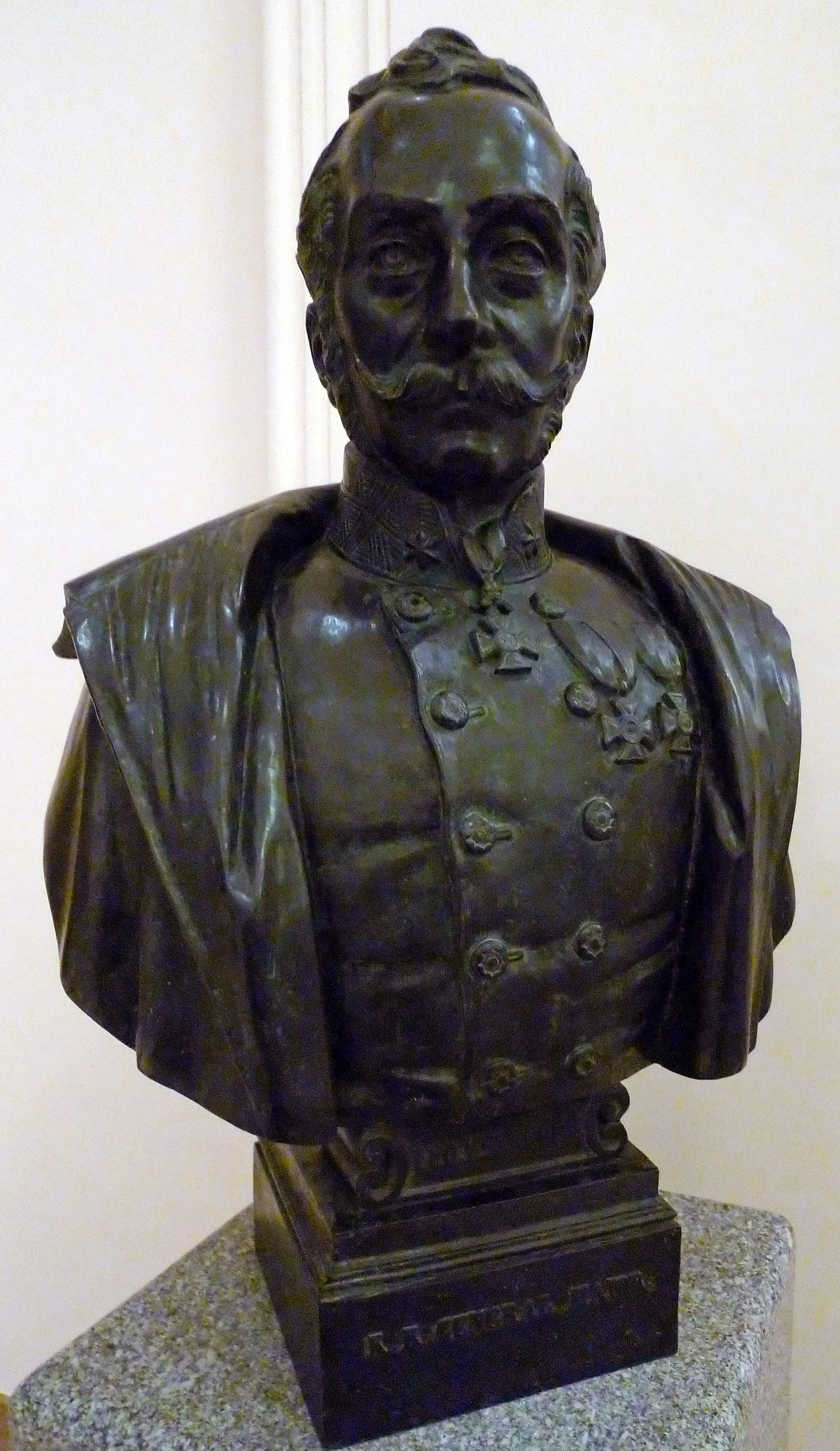
Bust of Benedek in the Heeresgeschichtliches Museum Wien

At the outbreak of the Austro-Prussian War in 1866, Benedek was made the commander in chief of the Northern Army. He had previously declined the appointment three times, claiming that he knew neither the terrain in the north nor the enemy. Delaying his departure from Verona for nearly two months, he arrived in Vienna only on 12 May and did not establish his headquarters at Olmütz (Olomouc) until 26 May. Furthermore, his two chiefs of staff, Krismanic and Henikstein, encouraged his pessimism and reluctance to engage the enemy.

While the Prussians advanced against and defeated Austria's German allies (Hanover, Hesse-Kassel, and Saxony), Benedek remained in a defensive posture. Urged by Emperor Franz Joseph's emissary, Lieutenant Colonel Friedrich Beck, to advance, Benedek and his staff replied the army was still not ready. Concerning himself with issues of military dress and ceremony and emphasizing the importance of close combat in the coming battles (despite the superiority of the Prussians' needle guns), Benedek only deployed his troops at the end of June. Marching in three columns, they took up defensive positions near the fortress of Josefstadt and the Saxon and Silesian mountain passes.

When the Prussians crossed into Bohemia, Benedek failed to mass his forces against the separate enemy formations and suffered defeats across his front (except for a costly stand at Trautenau). Despite ordering a change of tactics and suddenly admitting the importance of artillery fire prior to the bayonet charge, morale among both the leadership and soldiers was shaken, and Benedek ordered his troops back to Olmütz. Stating that a "catastrophe" was at hand, he pleaded with the emperor to make peace with Prussia. When this was refused, he drew up his army in a defensive position against the Elbe between Sadowa and Königgrätz.

When, on 3 July 1866, the Prussians attacked, Benedek had a numerical advantage. Yet he expected to face only the Prussian First Army, and the arrival of the Prussian Second Army under Crown Prince Frederick William, attacking the Austrian flank at Chlum, disrupted the Austrian lines. Benedek ordered a retreat and crossed the river himself in the evening and informed the emperor that the catastrophe he had feared had indeed taken place. He offered to rally again at Olmütz but the retreat became a near rout. On 10 July Archduke Albrecht was appointed commander of all armies and established defenses around Vienna. However, the Prussians had achieved their objectives and were suffering a cholera outbreak while the Austrians were desperate for an end to the fight; an armistice was signed on 21 July.

=== Loss of command ===
This placed Emperor Franz Joseph I in a difficult position. There was extensive demand for the blame for the defeat to be placed on Benedek. He resigned as commander-in-chief at Pozsony (Bratislava) on 26 July 1866. The highest military law senate imposed a court martial against him and was to investigate of the battle. This was stopped by the instruction of the emperor.

Benedek was ordered never to speak about the circumstances of the defeat. When a scathing article in the Wiener Zeitung on 8 December 1866 blamed him alone for the catastrophe, he had no right to reply.

The former first soldier of the Empire lived for another fifteen years in quiet retirement at Graz, and died there on 27 April 1881. He was buried at the Sankt Leonhard Cemetery in civilian clothing, without any military honors.
