= Wieliczka County =

Wieliczka County Powiat wielicki
- County
- Flag Coat of arms

- Location within the voivodeship

- Division into gminas
- Coordinates (Wieliczka): 49°59′22″N 20°3′58″E
- Country: Poland
- Voivodeship: Lesser Poland
- Seat: Wieliczka
- Gminas: Total 5: Gmina Biskupice; Gmina Gdów; Gmina Kłaj; Gmina Niepołomice; Gmina Wieliczka

Area
  - Total: 427.8 km^{2} (165.2 sq mi)

Population (2006)
  - Total: 105,266
  - Density: 246.1/km^{2} (637.3/sq mi)
  - Urban: 27,670
  - Rural: 77,596
- Car plates: KWI
- Website: www.powiatwielicki.pl

Wieliczka County (Polish: powiat wielicki) is a unit of territorial administration and local government (powiat) in Lesser Poland Voivodeship, southern Poland. It came into being on January 1, 1999, as a result of the Polish local government reforms passed in 1998. Its administrative seat and largest town is Wieliczka, which lies 13 kilometres (8 mi) south-east of the regional capital Kraków. The only other town in the county is Niepołomice, lying 12 km (7 mi) north-east of Wieliczka.

The county covers an area of 427.8 square kilometres (165.2 sq mi). As of 2006 its total population is 105,266, out of which the population of Wieliczka is 19,133, that of Niepołomice is 8,537, and the rural population is 77,596.

== Neighbouring counties ==
Wieliczka County is bordered by Bochnia County to the east, Myślenice County to the south, and the city of Kraków and Kraków County to the north-west.

== Administrative division ==
The county is subdivided into five gminas (two urban-rural and three rural). These are listed in the following table, in descending order of population.

Gmina	Type	Area (km^{2})	Population (2006)	Seat
Gmina Wieliczka	urban-rural	100.1	48,254	Wieliczka
Gmina Niepołomice	urban-rural	95.1	22,168	Niepołomice
Gmina Gdów	rural	108.0	16,340	Gdów
Gmina Kłaj	rural	83.1	9,832	Kłaj
Gmina Biskupice	rural	41.0	8,672	Trąbki
