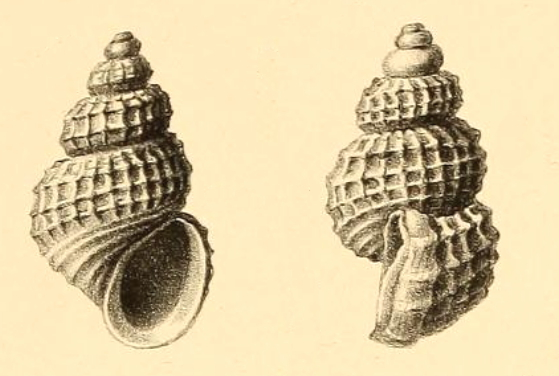
- Shell of Alvania veliscensis (holotype)

Scientific classification
- Kingdom: Animalia
- Phylum: Mollusca
- Class: Gastropoda
- Subclass: Caenogastropoda
- Order: Littorinimorpha
- Superfamily: Rissooidea
- Family: Rissoidae
- Genus: Alvania
- Species: †A. veliscensis

Binomial name
- †Alvania veliscensis Schwartz von Mohrenstern, 1867

= Alvania veliscensis =

Species of gastropod

Alvania veliscensis is an extinct species of minute sea snail, a marine gastropod mollusc or micromollusk in the family Rissoidae.

== Description ==
The length of the shell attains 3 mm, its diameter 1.6 mm.

== Distribution ==
Fossils of this species were in Mid Miocene strata in Wieliczka, Poland.
