= Jack Terry =

American author and Holocaust survivor (1930–2022)

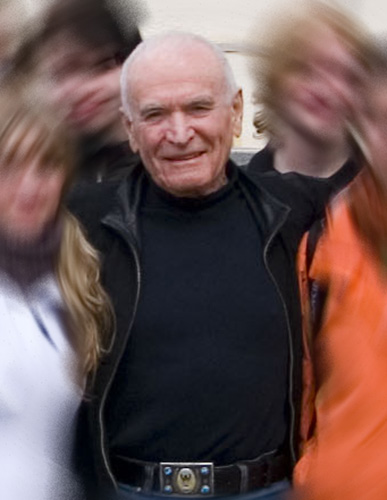
Jack Terry

Jack Terry (born Jakub Szabmacher; March 10, 1930 – October 30, 2022) was a Holocaust survivor, psychoanalyst, author and public speaker. Upon liberation in April 1945, he was the youngest surviving prisoner of the Flossenbürg concentration camp.

== Life ==
Terry was one of four children born of a Jewish merchant family named Szabmacher. He grew up in Bełżyce, Poland. During the German occupation, his father was first deported to the Majdanek Concentration Camp. Bełżyce was in the region of the Izbica Gestapo commander Kurt Engels, whom Terry witnessed commit several murders there. In October 1942, he and his family were expelled from the city together with the Jews still living there. When he realized that his mother was not in the column of deportees, he fled back to his hometown. There he found his mother and sister. His brother had been shot during the expulsion. At the beginning of 1943, the surviving members of the Szabmacher family were taken from the Bełżyce Ghetto to the Budzyń concentration camp near the town of Kraśnik in the Lublin District of the General Government territory of German-occupied Poland. While there he witnessed SS officer Reinhold Feix shoot his mother and sister during a selection on May 8, 1943. Terry was made to work in the aircraft yard of Budzyń's Ernst Heinkel aircraft works. As the Red Army approached, he was moved to an airplane production site in the salt mine at Wieliczka, and finally to Flossenbürg concentration camp at the beginning of August 1944. He first worked in the quarry, later in aircraft production, and later in the prisoner laundry during the last three months before liberation.

Terry was saved several times in Flossenbürg by a prisoner named Carl Schrade, a Swiss trader arrested in Berlin in 1934 for criticizing National Socialism. When liberated in 1945 he was the longest-held concentration-camp prisoner in Nazi Germany.

On April 8, 1945, the SS began to evacuate the Flossenbürg camp under the pressure from advancing U.S. Army troops. The commander, Max Koegel, sent the prisoners on a death march to Dachau concentration camp. Fellow prisoners hid the 15-year-old Terry in a pipe tunnel that led from the laundry to the kitchen. When the U.S. Army entered the camp on April 23, 1945, he was the youngest surviving prisoner, and the only member of his family to survive the Holocaust.

A U.S. colonel who was part of the liberating forces took Terry under his wing and helped to bring him to the United States. Terry returned to Germany in the 1950s as a U.S. soldier in a unit stationed in Heidelberg. In the U.S., he first studied geology, but later switched to medicine and worked as a psychoanalyst in New York City.

In 1995, Terry returned to Flossenbürg for the 50th anniversary of its liberation and to meet with former prisoners. For many years thereafter, Terry visited the Flossenbürg camp memorial annually. He was a member of the board of the Stiftung Bayerische Gedenkstätten (Bavarian Memorials Foundation) and an active spokesman for the former prisoners of Flossenbürg. In 2005, Terry, with Alicia Nitecki, wrote the book Jakub's World: A Boy's Story of Loss and Survival in the Holocaust, in which he recounts his life story and experiences during the Holocaust. In January 2011, ZDFneo aired a 45-minute documentary The Two Lives of Jack Terry.

Terry was awarded the Bavarian Order of Merit in July 2007 for his outstanding civic commitment.

He died on October 30, 2022, at the age of 92.

== Book by Jack Terry ==
Nitecki, Alicia and Terry, Jack. Jakub's World: A Boy's Story of Loss and Survival in the Holocaust. SUNY Press. Albany, New York. April 2005.
