= Marcin Niewalda =

Marcin Niewalda (born 1969 in Kraków), genealogist, musician, photographer, member of Art-Club of Wieliczka, editor-in-chief of Dynamic Armorial of Polish Families.
