= Siuda Baba =

Old Polish folk custom, celebrated on Easter Monday

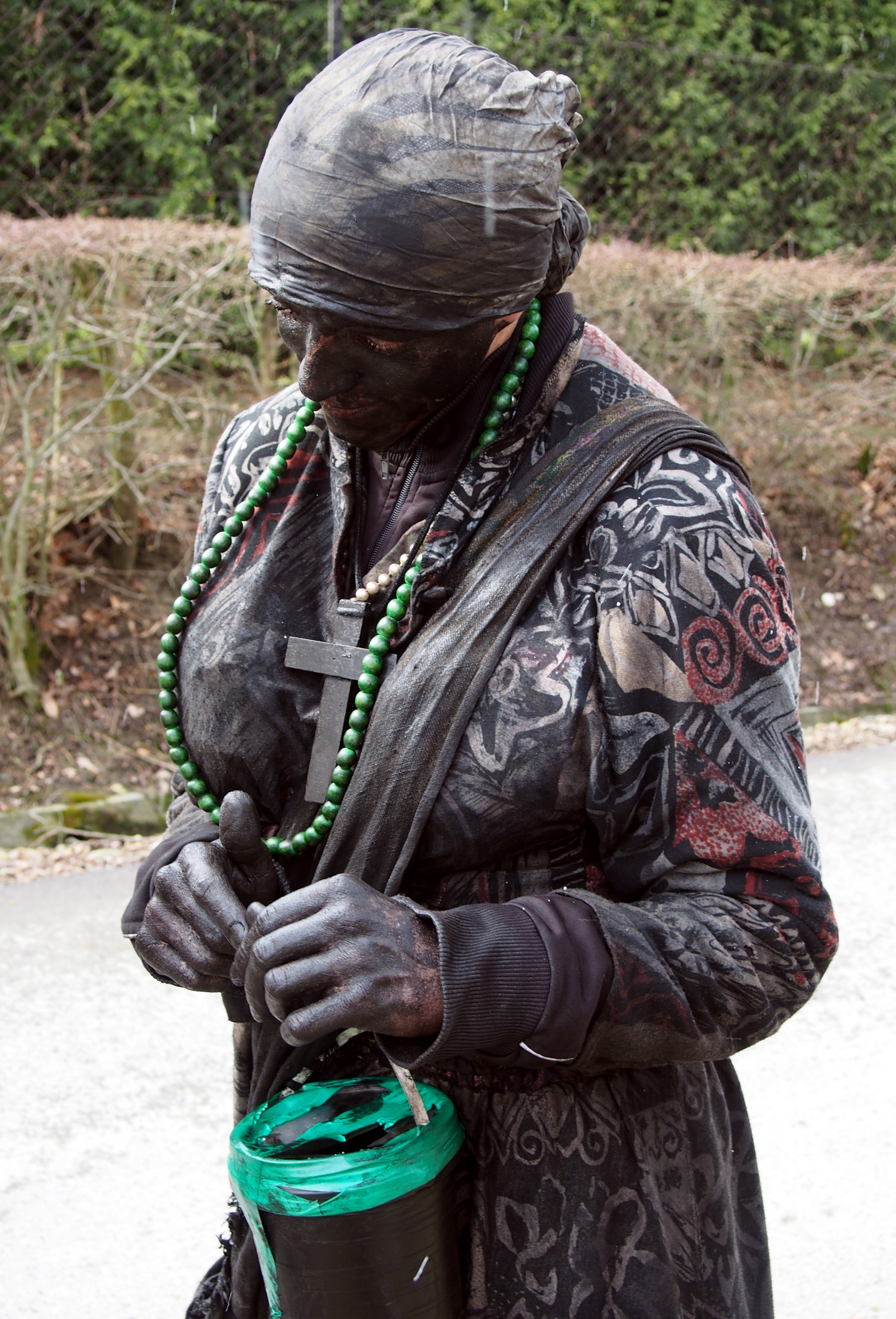
A man dressed as Siuda Baba in Lednica Górna, 2015

Siuda Baba is an old Polish folk custom, celebrated on Easter Monday and surviving today in only a handful of villages surrounding Kraków. The character of Siuda Baba is performed by a local man who dresses up as a shabbily clothed woman whose face is blackened with soot. Siuda Baba walks from house to house, accompanied by other characters – a Gypsy and Krakowiacy (men dressed in traditional outfits). The group visits houses, collecting donations and smearing girls' faces with soot.

== The custom's origins ==
The tradition calls upon Slavic spring rites of banishing winter. Legend tells of a pagan temple that once was active near Lednica Górna. The temple stood near a stream in the holy grove on a hill named Kopcowa Góra. Once a year, in early spring, the priestess protecting the holy fire left the temple walls to search for a successor. The girl she chose could not buy herself out; girls would therefore hide wherever they could. Siuda Baba symbolises the priestess; soot is used to blacken Siuda Baba's face, as the priestess was not allowed to wash or leave the temple. Another interpretation suggests the new priestess' face had been blackened to mark her as the successor.

The inhabitants of Lednica Górna name different locations for the holy spring and temple: most frequently the sources of the Leda stream. The springs, located in the village, are shrouded in mystery and rarely shown to strangers.

The custom survived only in villages and towns surrounding Kraków. Christian elements have later been added to the legend, and as a result the Siuda Baba enactment is presented on Easter Monday in Lednica Górna and in the nearby city of Wieliczka.

The role of Siuda Baba is performed by a local man who dresses up in rags and blackens his face. He also wears a necklace made of chestnuts or potatoes and a large basket on his back. The same character in Wieliczka carries a large cross in one hand and a soot-dipped whip in the other, and is alone.

Siuda Baba walks from house to house accompanied by another man, dressed up as a Gypsy, and four young men wearing traditional Krakowiak costumes, although this requirement is not always met. Siuda Baba (in Wieliczka) or one of the men (in Lednica Górna) is equipped with a cart and collects donations. The group chases passers-by, blackens their faces with soot and sometimes douse them with water.

== The ritual ==
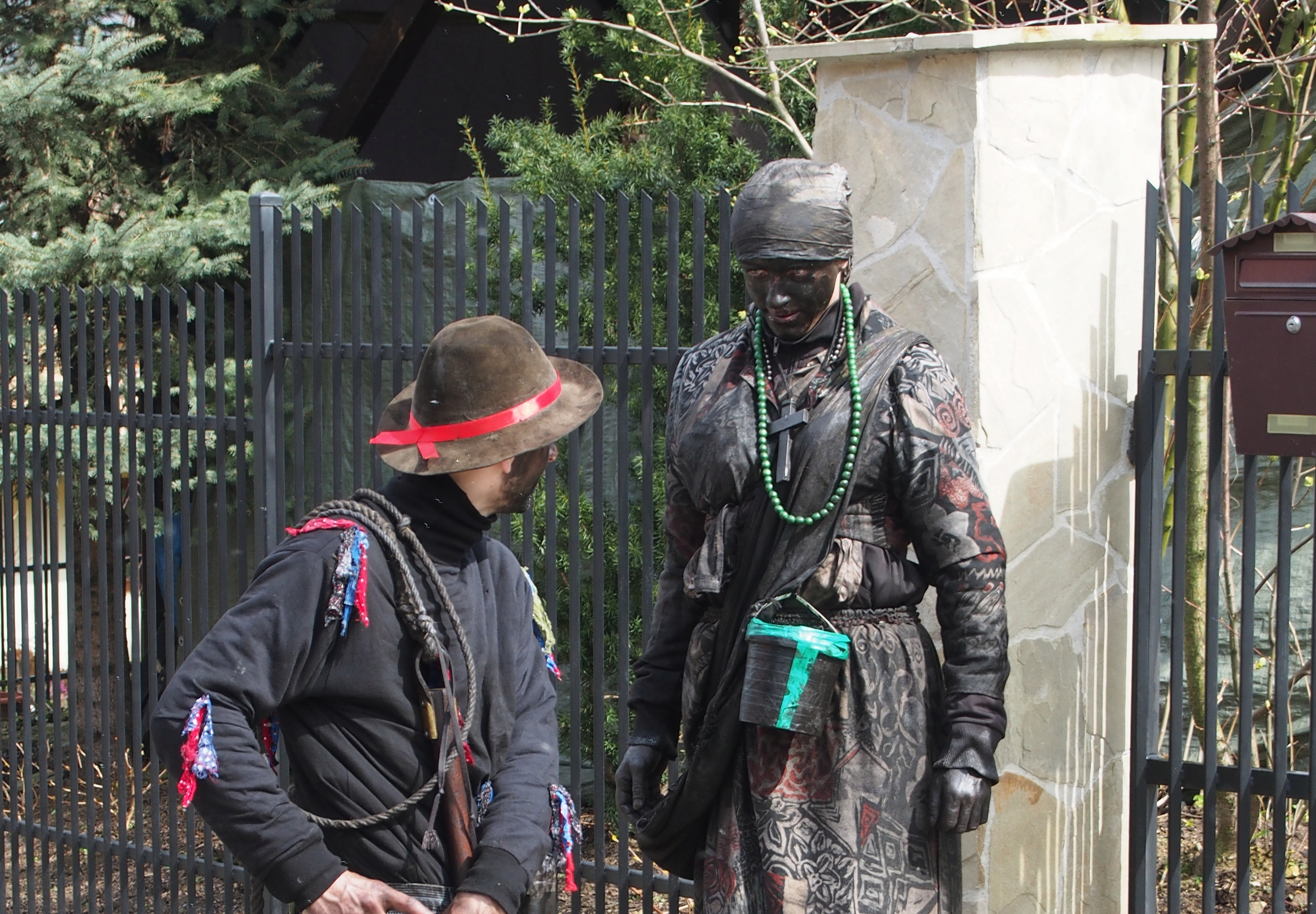
Siuda Baba and the Gypsy get ready to visit local residents.

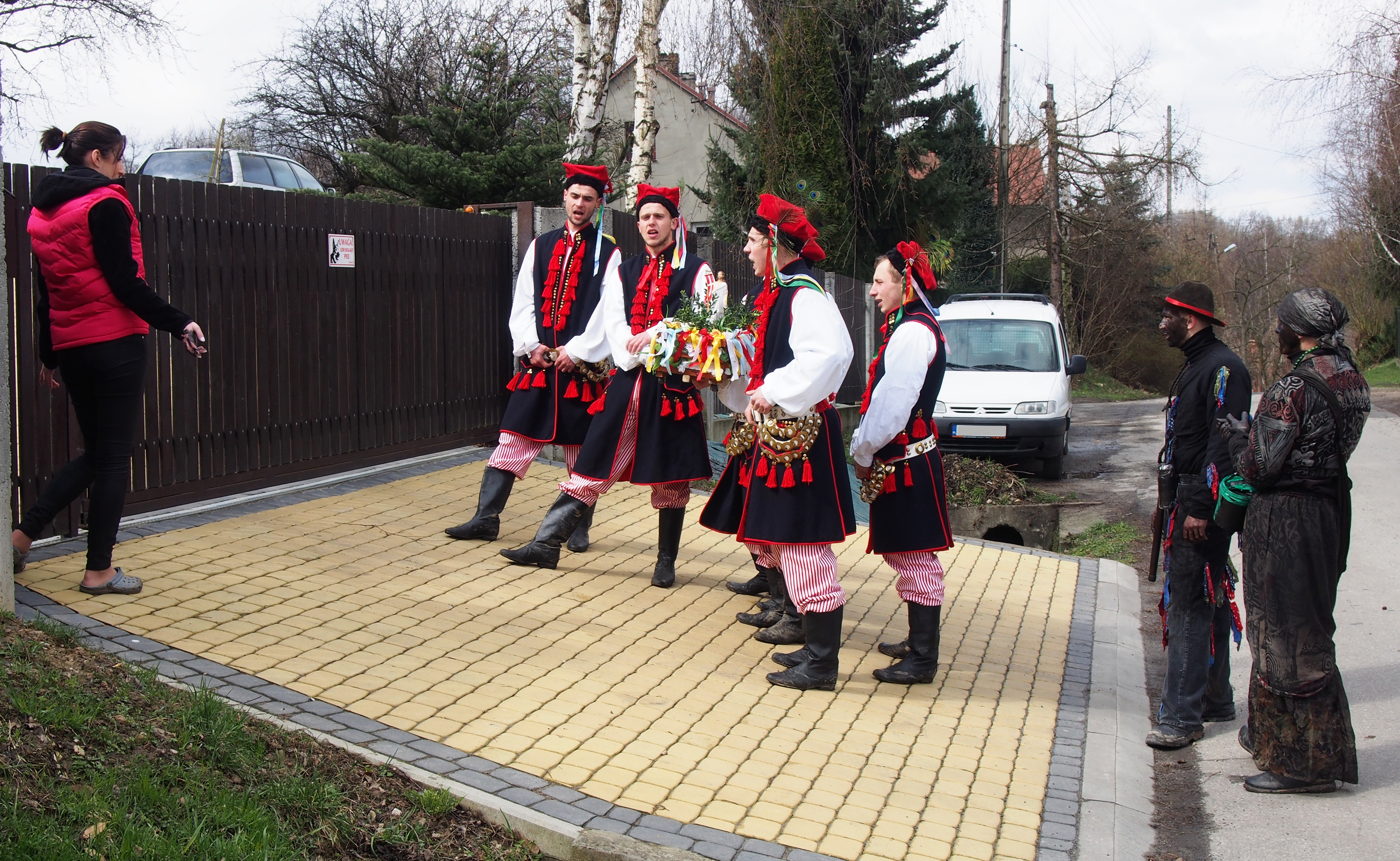
A procession of Krakowiacy, Siuda Baba and the Gypsy visiting residents

A Siuda Baba procession is made up of eight or six people – young men aged 20–24: six (or four) Krakowiacy, the Gypsy and Siuda Baba. Before they start on their route, preparations are made. The group meets at the Gypsy's home, where they don their costumes: Krakowiacy wear traditional regional folk attire; Siuda Baba – an old, dirty skirt, a necklace made of potatoes, chestnuts, or wooden beads, a scarf used as a pouch for a box with the soot-lotion mixture. The Gypsy wears black trousers with small, black scraps sewn on, a black shirt and hat. The Gypsy's whip is an important accessory: the Gypsy cracks it when entering someone's yard. The faces and palms of both the Gypsy and the Siuda Baba are thoroughly covered with soot. They carry a supply of pre-prepared mix of lotion and soot used for smearing passers-by. The regional costumes worn by Krakowiacy used to be handmade, but since the 1970s have been replaced with factory-made outfits. The current ones have been financed by European Union's rural development funds. The group lugs a cart adorned with a statue of Jesus – a place for donations. The cart is prepared by local girls.

The conduct usually follows a pre-planned route and is led by the Gypsy, who usually runs in front to reach the next house as soon as possible. A Siuda Baba's visit begins with the Gypsy cracking his whip. Depending on the level of acquaintance between the visitors and the host, the visit can begin in two ways – if the hosts are close friends, the boys don't hesitate to enter without explicit permission.

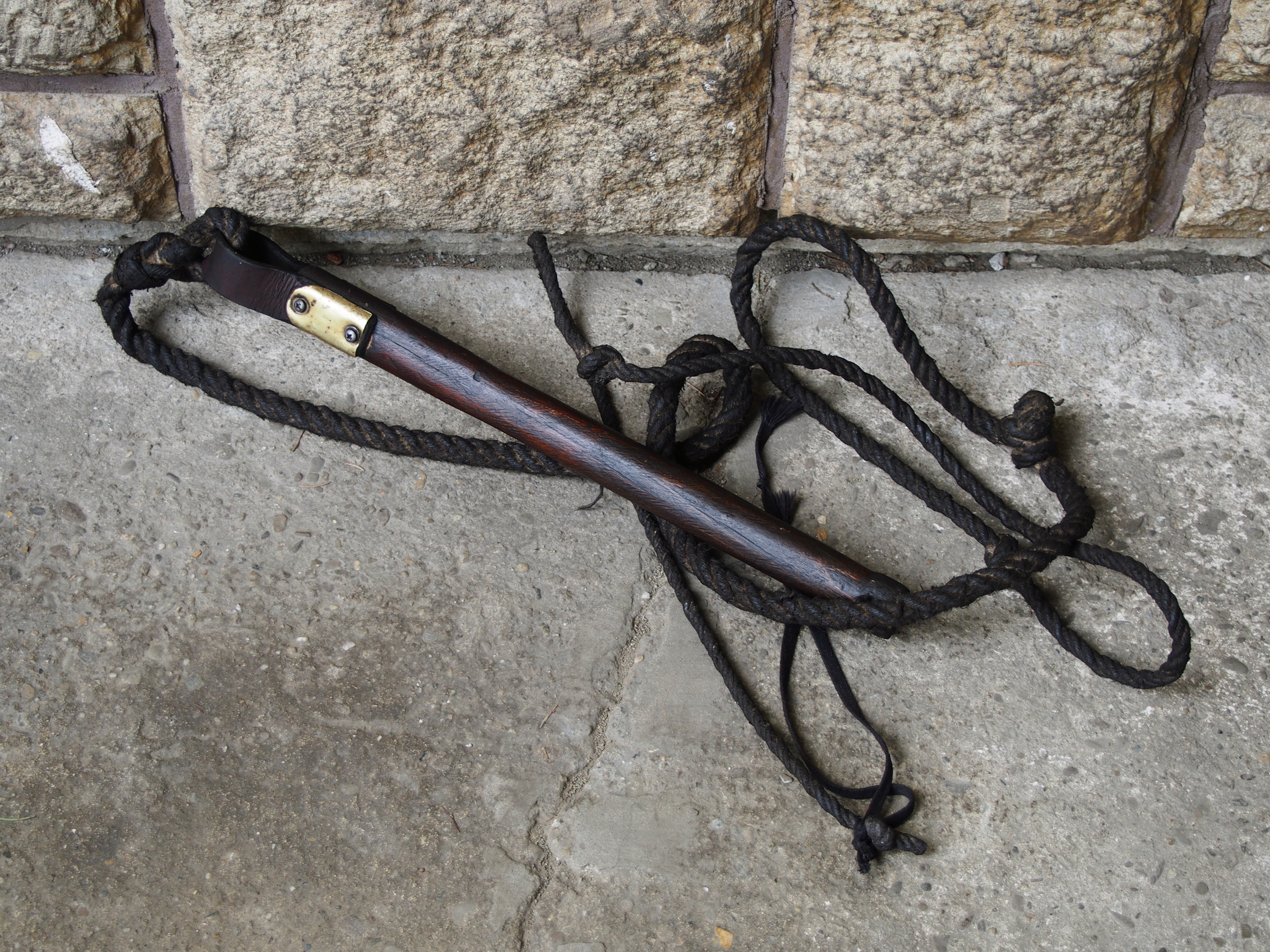
Whip used by the Gypsy during Easter Siuda Baba celebrations, Lednica Górna 2015

If they go to people they don't know, the Gypsy, after cracking his whip, politely asks the hosts to allow the group to enter. Refusing them might result in minor negative consequences: marking the door handle, mailbox or other household items with the soot/lotion mixture. If the hosts agree for Siuda Baba to enter, the Krakowiacy begin singing. Sometimes the proceedings take place in the yard, on the porch or at the door. After the opening query: "Will you receive the resurrected Christ?" and if the answer is affirmative, the Krakowiacy sing Easter-themed songs, shaking the cart and the jingles attached to their belts.

The Redeemer resurrected, Saviour of the world
In one night with his power he has conquered hell.
The Lord's Mother went
to a meadow for some water...

Then suddenly a line about Siuda Baba is inserted in the song lyrics in an unexpected moment. Suddenly Krakowiacy sing "Where's Siuda Baba..." and Siuda Baba barges into the house and with the Gypsy's help, smears everyone (especially girls, who should be found first) with the soot mix. The hosts give the departing group a piece of Easter cheesecake or some other refreshment and place some money in the cart. The procession continues until late in the evening.

Children and onlookers follow her, shouting:

Siuda, red or ash
Goes around with whip
Siuda, red or ash
a whip, a whip – a chimney sweep.

== Siuda Baba celebrations in modern times ==
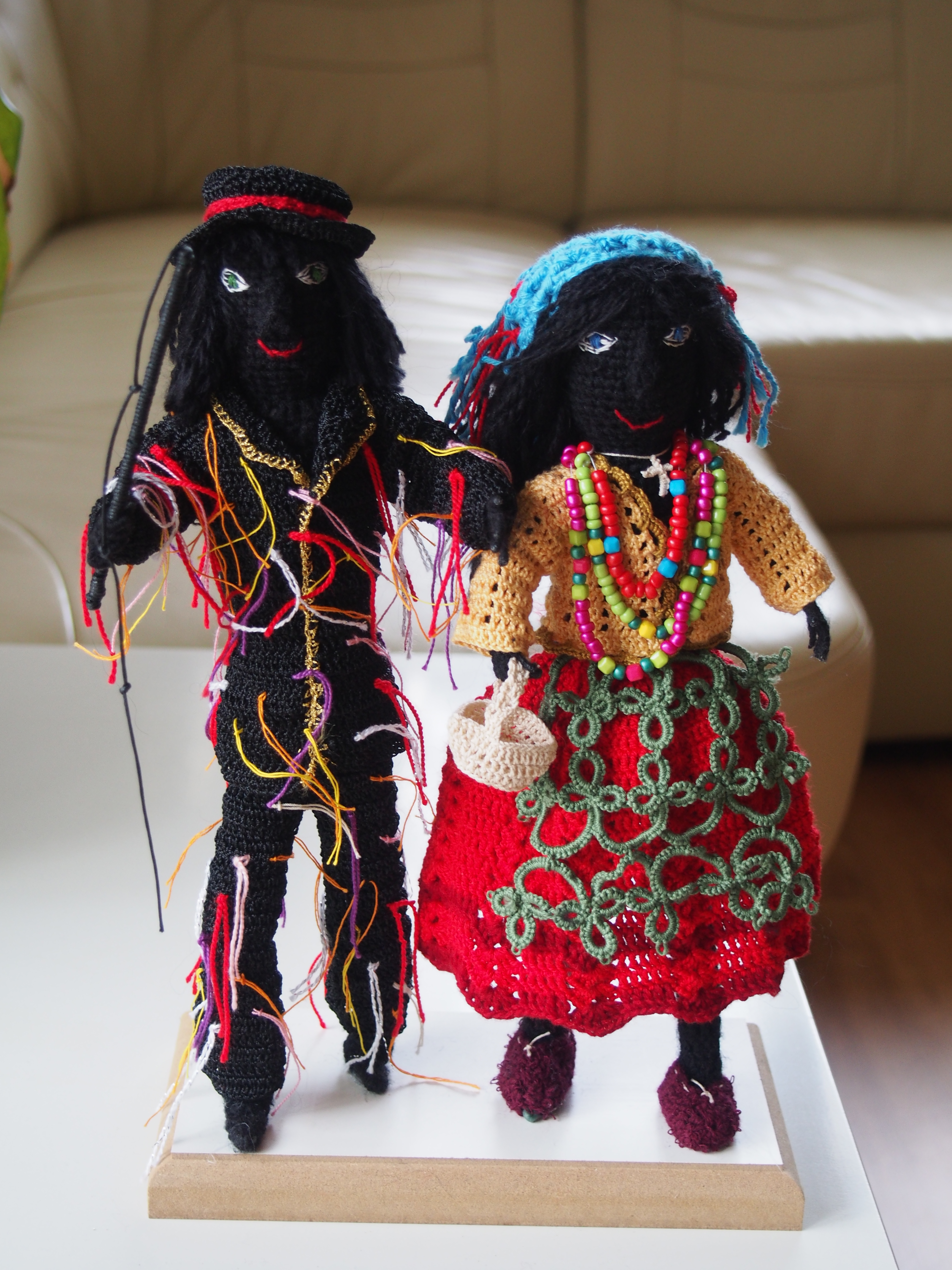
Siuda Baba and the Gypsy as handcrafted toys

The men who participate in the proceedings are usually aged 20–24 and motivated by the prospect of fun, visiting friends and collecting donations. They follow a number of rules – the roles of characters are clearly defined, the ones participating for the first time usually carry the cart. The Gypsy is often a hereditary role and the secret of manufacturing the whip is passed down the generations, as is the skill to crack it well. Only unmarried men can be members of the Siuda Baba procession. When an older brother, who performed the role of Gypsy gets married, the younger brother inherits the role and learns how to crack the whip.

Due to population migration, some of the new inhabitants of Lednica Górna are unfamiliar with the ritual. Some are very enthusiastic when visited by a Siuda conduct, treating it as a tourist attraction; others clearly dislike it and do not open the door. Local residents who are well acquainted with the tradition believe that having one's face blackened by Siuda Baba brings good luck for the coming year; a smeared girl may expect to get married soon. Anyone spotted attempting to clean the soot off will be smeared again.

"Ledniczanie" – the Lednica Górna Association – supports the tradition and encourages young people to keep it alive. Siuda Baba is the symbol of Lednica Górna and frequently appears on local handmade items.

== See also ==
- Śmigus-dyngus – Celebration held on Easter Monday in Poland and Central Europe
- Śmiergust – Polish folk custom
- Zwarte Piet – Saint Nicholas companion in Low Countries folklore
