= Max Glauben =

American educator

Max Glauben (born Moniek Mendel Glauben on January 14, 1928, in Warsaw, Poland; died April 28, 2022, in Dallas, Texas) was a Polish-born American educator, community organizer, writer, and Holocaust survivor.

Between 1940 and 1945, Glauben survived the Warsaw Ghetto, the Majdanek death camp, the Budzyń concentration camp, and the Dachau concentration camp.

After liberation, Glauben moved to the United States and settled in Dallas in the early 1950s. He was drafted into the U.S. Army during the Korean War, and worked in the toy industry until his retirement.

In the late 1970s, Glauben began to speak about his experience during the Holocaust. Along with several other Dallas-area Holocaust survivors, Glauben was one of the co-founders of the Dallas Holocaust and Human Rights Museum, which opened in 1984.

For "being a source of hope and inspiration for his message of tolerance, fairness and forgiveness," the Dallas Morning News named Glauben its "Texan of the Year" in 2019.

== Personal life ==
Glauben's mother Faiga and younger brother Heniek were murdered in the gas chambers at Majdenek. Glauben's father Isaak was killed by guards at Budzyn.

== Awards and honors ==
- Texan of the Year, Dallas Morning News (2019)
- Doctor of Humane Letters, Southern Methodist University (SMU) (2020)
- Hope for Humanity award, Dallas Holocaust and Human Rights Museum (2021)
