= Budzyń concentration camp =

Nazi concentration camp

Budzyń
- Nazi concentration camp
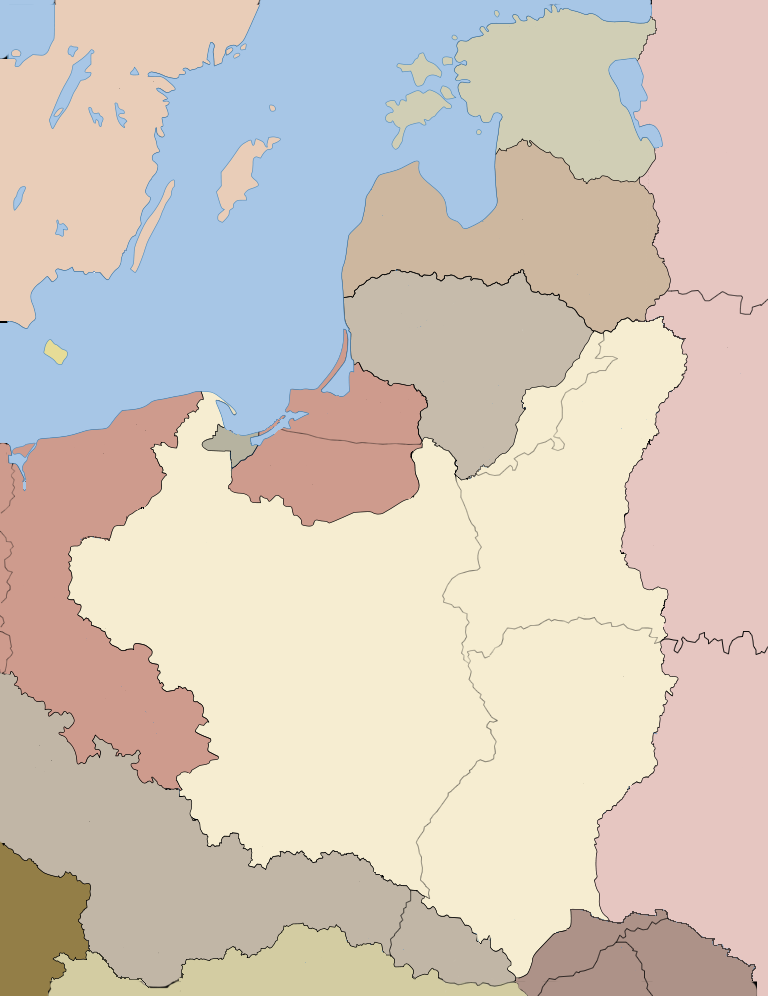
- Location within Poland Location within Poland Location within Lublin Voivodeship
- Coordinates: 50.95°N 22.2°E
- Location: Kraśnik, General Government (German-occupied Poland)
- Commandant: Otto Hantke (Sept. 1941–Dec. 1941); Heinrich Stoschek (Early 1943); Reinhold Feix (Until August 1943); Werner Mohr; Fritz Tauscher (Sept. 1943-January 1944); Josef Leipold (Jan. 1944-June 1944
- Original use: Forced labor
- Operational: Spring 1942-June or July 1944
- Inmates: Jews
- Number of inmates: 3,000
- Killed: Estimated dozens
- Notable inmates: Max Glauben

Budzyń concentration camp was a forced labor and concentration camp built and operated by the SS of Nazi Germany between the Spring of 1942 and June/July 1944. It was located in the industrial district of Kraśnik, Poland, in the Lublin District of the General Government territory of German-occupied Poland. Budzyń began as a sub-camp of the Majdanek concentration camp, but became an independent concentration camp in October 1943 after the deportation of over 1,000 Jews after the Warsaw Ghetto Uprising.

The camp held also Poles from Polish villages which were expelled or punitively pacified for aiding partisans. After some time and the brutal police examination, some of these individuals were sent via the transit camp in Lublin to the various locations in Germany for forced labor.

At its peak, over 3,000 prisoners were forced laborers at the camp, working in military factories such as the Heinkel aircraft factory, or conducting manual labor.

== History ==
The first transports of Jews to the camp in Budzyń began in spring 1942. By the summer, there were 500 Jews from Kraśnik, Bełżyce, Janów Lubelski, Mińsk, Mohylów, Smoleńsk, Vienna, and Slovakia. By the summer of 1942, 500 Jews were brought to the camp from nearby towns. That fall, 400 prisoners of war arrived from the ghettos in Końskowola and Lublin, while 100 sick, elderly, and very young inmates were deported to Belzec extermination camp.

After the defeat of the Warsaw Ghetto Uprising, the Nazis deported more than 1,000 Jews from Warsaw to Budzyń. By mid-1943, there were 3,000 people imprisoned in the camp, including 300 women and children. In August 1943, 200 of the camp's prisoners were sent to Majdanek. On October 22, 1943 Budzyn was declared an independent concentration camp.

On February 8, 1944, dozens of prisoners were massacred by Ukrainian guards.

Conditions in Budzyn were somewhat bearable, due to the efforts of the Nazi-appointed camp elder, Noah Stockman. In one case, some prisoners stole weapons from the military factories where they worked and escaped to the forest to join the Partisans. Stockman was able to convince the camp authorities not to retaliate against the Jews. On Passover 1944, Stockman managed to have matzah baked in the camp and hold a Seder for the Jewish holiday of Passover. In July 1944, Budzyn was evacuated and the prisoners were sent to nearby camps at Płaszów and Mauthausen.

== Notable inmates ==
- Max Glauben - activist and educator who co-founded the Dallas Holocaust Museum
- Laura Hillman - a Schindlerjude, who survived the Holocaust with the help of Oskar Schindler
- Stephan Ross - activist who spearheaded the creation of the New England Holocaust Memorial in Boston, Massachusetts
- Jack Terry

== See also ==
- List of Nazi concentration camps
