= Lednica Górna =

- Village
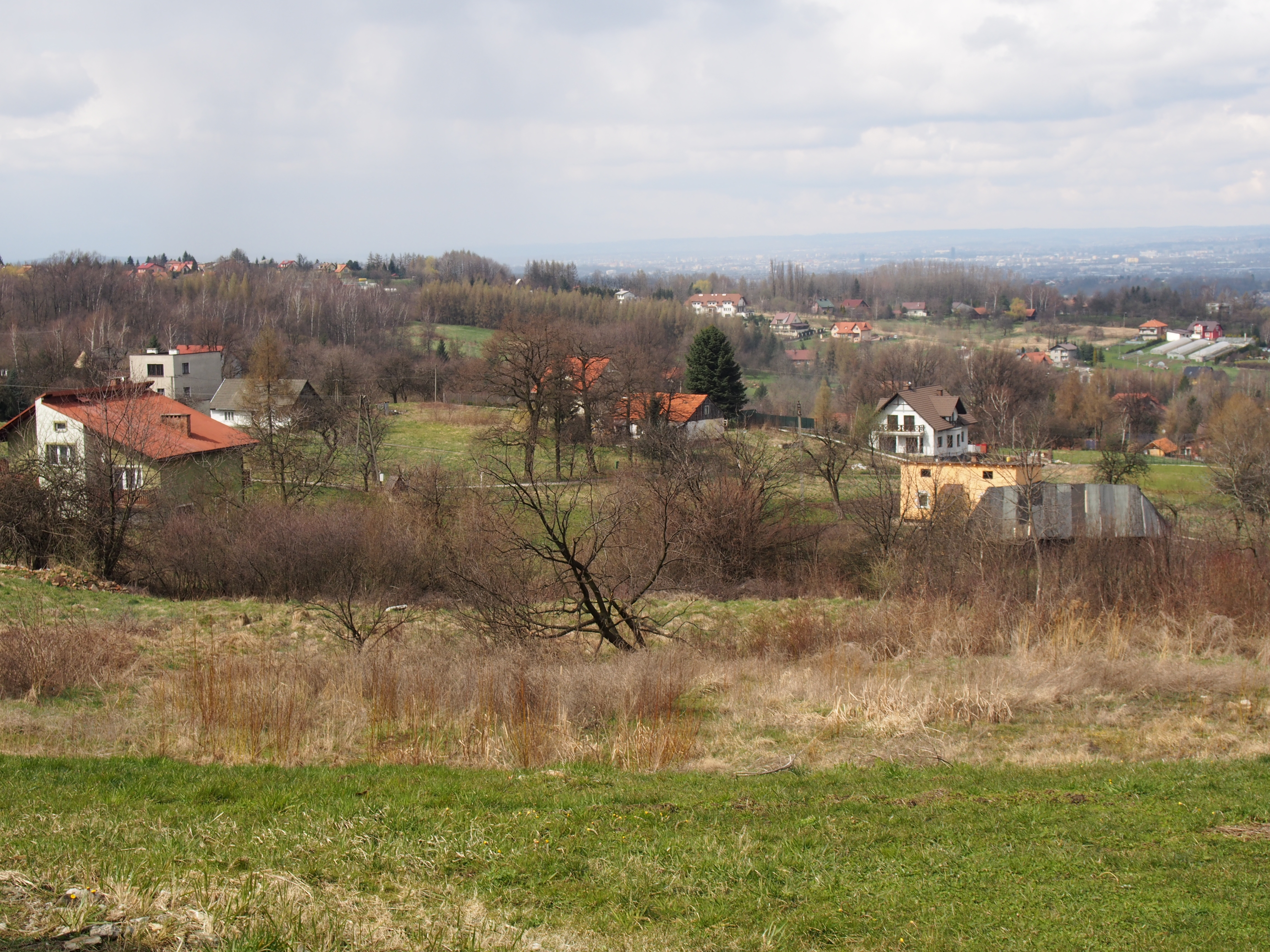

- Location within Poland
- Coordinates: 49°58′N 20°5′E
- Country: Poland
- Voivodeship: Lesser Poland
- County: Wieliczka
- Gmina: Wieliczka

Lednica Górna [lɛdˈnit͡sa ˈɡurna] is a village in the administrative district of Gmina Wieliczka, within Wieliczka County, Lesser Poland Voivodeship, in southern Poland.

Lednica Górna, as well as the nearby town of Wieliczka are among the last places in Poland where the Easter tradition of Siuda Baba is still practised.
