= Dallas Holocaust and Human Rights Museum =

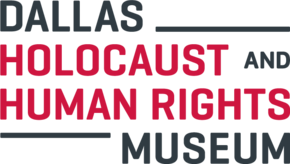

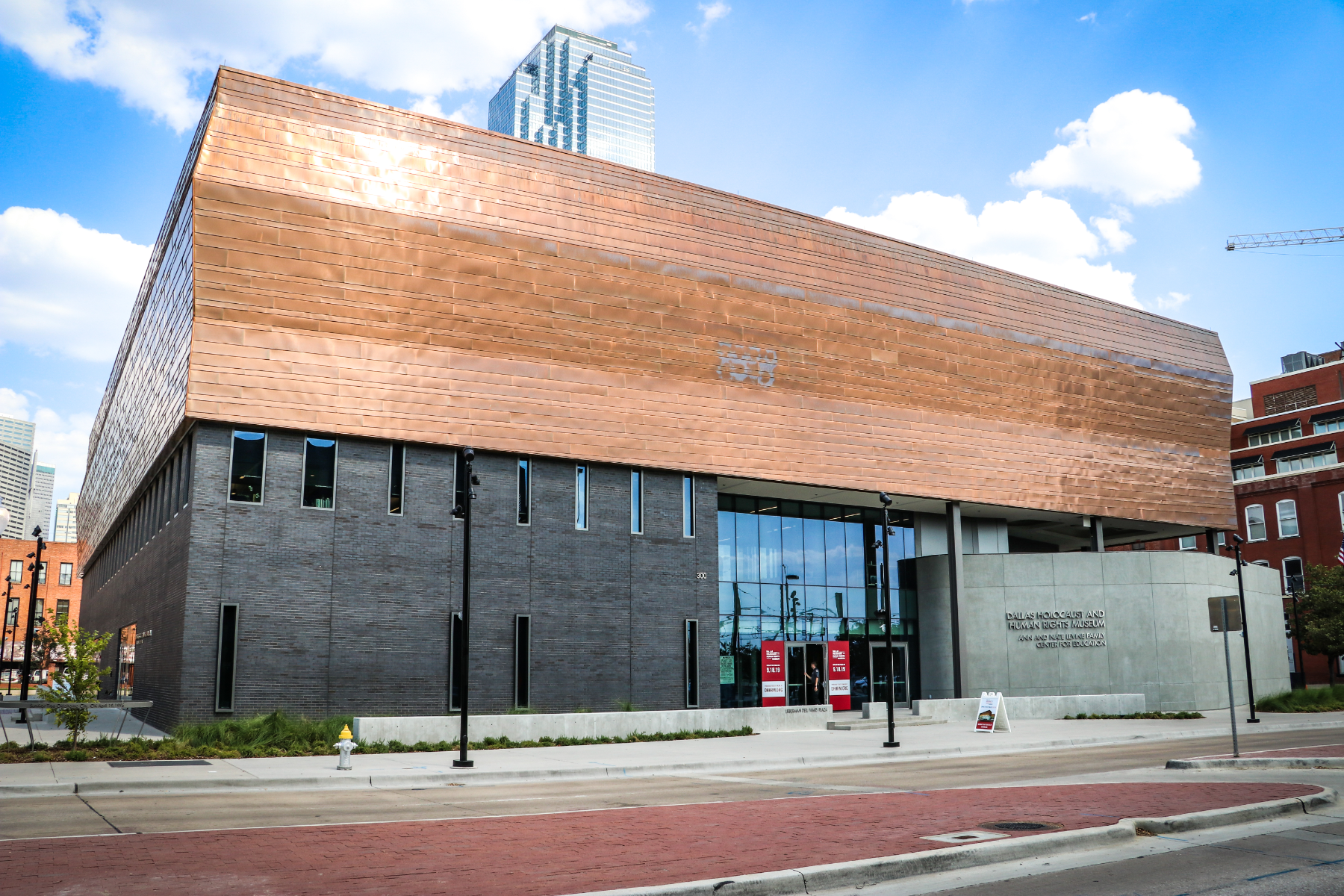
- Museum Entrance on Houston Street

- DHHRM (the United States)
- Former name: Dallas Holocaust Museum Center for Education and Tolerance
- Established: 1984
- Location: 300 N Houston St, Dallas, TX 75202
- Coordinates: 32°46′49″N 96°48′27″W
- Type: Holocaust / human rights museum
- Visitors: +80,000 annually (2018)
- President: Mary Pat Higgins
- Architect: Omniplan
- Public transit access: DART - West End station
- Parking: 333 N Houston St, Dallas, TX 75202
- Website: Dallas Holocaust and Human Rights Museum
- Kingman-Texas Building
- U.S. Historic district – Contributing property
- Dallas Landmark Historic District; Contributing Property
- Location: 209-211 N. Record St.
- Built: 1907
- Architectural style: Richardsonian Romanesque
- Part of: West End Historic District (ID78002918)
- DLMKHD No.: H/2 (West End HD)

Significant dates
- Designated CP: November 14, 1978
- Designated DLMKHD: October 6, 1975

The Dallas Holocaust and Human Rights Museum (formerly the Dallas Holocaust Museum Center for Education and Tolerance) is a history education museum in Dallas, Texas, in the West End Historic District at the southeast corner of N. Houston Street and Ross Avenue. Its mission is to teach the history of the Holocaust and advance human rights to combat prejudice, hatred, and indifference. It features climate-controlled archives and a research library to expand education.

The current facility opened on September 18, 2019.

== History ==
In 1977, 125 Dallas-based Jewish Holocaust survivors, including Max Glauben, met and formed an organization called Holocaust Survivors in Dallas. In 1984, the survivors, along with North Texas benefactors, established The Dallas Memorial Center for Holocaust Studies. The center was located in the Dallas Jewish Community Center in North Dallas. In January 2005, the Memorial Center changed its name to the Dallas Holocaust Museum Center for Education and Tolerance and moved to a transitional space in downtown Dallas. The Museum is now in a 55,000-square-foot permanent location at the former Kingman-Texas Building in Dallas' historic West End.

The DHHRM is part of the Monuments Men and Women Museum Network, launched in 2021 by the Monuments Men Foundation for the Preservation of Art.

== Permanent Exhibition ==
The Museum's permanent exhibition consists of four wings designed by Berenbaum Jacobs Associates—Orientation Wing, Holocaust / Shoah Wing, Human Rights Wing, and Pivot to America Wing.

=== Orientation Wing ===
A Museum tour begins here. Visitors enter an intimate theater to view a brief film. Fundamental questions are posed, such as, "Why should I care about the Holocaust and human rights? And, what can I do about these things?" Upon exiting the theater, visitors learn about the Jews, "the longest hatred", and why this hatred was central to the rise of Hitler and the Nazis. They also see a glimpse of Jewish life in Europe before the Holocaust through a photo mural of the families of Dallas-area Survivors. From here, visitors enter the third-floor exhibitions.

=== Holocaust / Shoah Wing ===
This wing explores the history of the Holocaust. Highlights include 68 local Survivor testimonies, 9 original films, a geographic approach to the material, and a focus on Upstanders across Europe. Visitors may also walk through an authentic Nazi-era rail car, the first ever displayed in a museum anywhere in the world.

=== Human Rights Wing ===
In the Human Rights Wing, the exhibition focuses on advances in the global approach to human rights—starting with the Universal Declaration of Human Rights, which provides aspirational guidance to people and nations. This wing explores the importance of the Nuremberg Trials for representational justice after World War II and the Holocaust. Also here is the Ten Stages of Genocide Gallery which contains 10 floor-to-ceiling islands, each representing an historical genocide, including the Rwandan genocide of the Tutsis, the Guatemalan genocide, and the Holodomor in Ukraine.

=== Pivot to America Wing ===
The Pivot to America Wing challenges visitors to "Embrace Ideals. Challenge Reality. Participate in Repair." This wing addresses the American experience, American ideals, American reality, and the repair process by which the country strives to bring its ideals and reality more closely into accord. Visitors explore the development of civil and human rights throughout the country's history via interactive kiosks, and they learn about Upstanders, from Texas and beyond, who have driven the process of repair in America. The visitor experience culminates in a Call to Action, a challenge to embrace ideals, challenge reality, and participate in repair. Here, visitors can connect with activities and organizations to start to make a difference.

The Museum also incorporates a 250-seat theater for special events, presentations, and video testimony from local Holocaust survivors.

== Dimensions in Testimony Theater ==
The Museum features a permanent interactive exhibition called Dimensions in Testimony, implemented by the USC Shoah Foundation. The Dimensions in Testimony Theater uses 3D holographic technology and artificial intelligence to present genocide survivors answering questions about their experiences long after they are gone. Visitors can interact with Survivors as if they are in the room with them.

Max Glauben, one of the original founders of the Museum, was filmed by the USC Shoah Foundation in 2018 using a 360-degree, 18-camera and green screen setup. Glauben, who survived the Warsaw Ghetto as a child and was orphaned at 13 while in the Budzyn Labor Camp, was asked more than 1,000 questions about his life for his holographic projection. He is one of the featured Holocaust survivors with whom visitors interact in the Dimensions in Testimony Theater.

== Design and Architecture ==
The Museum was designed from the inside out with the help of Dr. Michael Berenbaum, former project director of the U.S. Holocaust Memorial Museum. The Museum's façade is designed to blend with the historic brick masonry architecture of the historic West End while also standing out by using a large band of copper cladding around the outside of the building. Over time, the copper will age and develop a patina, reflecting the importance of perseverance and weathering the storm. OMNIPLAN was the architect, Texas based Datum Engineers, Inc. were the structural engineering team and Seattle-based Pacific Studio fabricated and assembled the core exhibition components. The Museum will now be able to accommodate over 200,000 visitors a year. Half of this number are anticipated to be students.

== See also ==
- National Register of Historic Places listings in Dallas County, Texas
- List of Dallas Landmarks
- Dallas Jewish History
