= Otto Hantke =

German war criminal (1907–1986)

- Born: 21 January 1907; Kietrz, Upper Silesia, German Empire
- Died: 18 November 1986 (aged 79); Duisburg, North Rhine-Westphalia, West Germany
- Military career
- Allegiance: Nazi Germany
- Branch: Schutzstaffel
- Rank: Unterscharführer
- Commands: Budzyń; Poniatowa

Otto Hantke (21 January 1907 – 18 November 1986) was a German SS-Unterscharführer, convicted murderer, and war criminal in German-occupied Poland during the Holocaust. Hantke joined the Nazi Party and the SS by 1933. Between at least 1942 and 1944, Hantke served as the commandant of the Budzyń labor camp and Poniatowa concentration camp, both subcamps of the Majdanek concentration camp, and was an SS officer at the Lipowa 7 concentration camp and Stutthof concentration camp.

In his role at Poniatowa, Hantke helped coordinate the deportation of Jews to the camp during the liquidation of the Warsaw Ghetto after the Warsaw Ghetto Uprising.

For his participation during the Holocaust, Hantke was imprisoned as a suspected war criminal in Germany from 1961 until 1967. In 1974, at the age of 67, Hantke was convicted and sentenced to life imprisonment for crimes committed in 1942 and 1943, including shooting to death at least four people during the deportation of Jews from Krasnik in November 1942.

== Early life ==
Otto Hantke was born on 21 January 1907, in Kietrz, Upper Silesia. He joined the SS of the Nazi Party by 1933.

== Actions during the Holocaust ==
=== Lipowa 7 concentration camp ===
Hantke was an SS officer at the Lipowa 7 concentration camp in Lublin. Based on Hantke's reputation as a "good organizer," the SS and Police Leader in Lublin Odilo Globocnik personally ordered him to go to Krasnik.

=== Budzyń concentration camp ===
From September to December 1942, Hantke helped establish and served as the first commandant of the Budzyń labor camp, where the inmates were slave laborers at a Heinkel aircraft factory.

In his role at Budzyń, Hantke was responsible for the selection during the final liquidation of the Kraśnik ghetto in November 1942, in accordance with the orders from Christian Wirth, the Inspector of the Aktion Reinhard murder regime. Hantke chose about 150 men from Krasnik to be imprisoned at Budzyń, with the rest deported to the Belzec death camp. He later sent 50 prisoners from Budzyń to be expelled to Zaklikow. He shot dead others, including teenager Baruch Krumholz.

=== Poniatowa concentration camp ===
From May through the summer of 1943, Hantke replaced Birmes-Schulten as the second commandant of the Poniatowa concentration camp, another Majdanek subcamp. Hantke was in Warsaw during the liquidation of the Warsaw Ghetto after the Warsaw Ghetto Uprising in May 1943 in order to coordinate the deportation of Jews to Poniatowa.

He was replaced as commandant at Poniatowa by Gottlieb Hering, who had served as commandant of the Belzec death camp. According to the testimony of Holocaust survivors, Hantke brutally mistreated the prisoners at Poniatowa.

=== Other activities ===
In the summer of 1943, Hantke was sent to Pulawy in order to establish another subcamp of Majdanek in the local sawmill. Although the sawmill operated profitably, thanks to the exploitation of the prisoners' work, the prisoners there, as in other camps of the Majdanek complex, were shot on 3 November 1943, as part of Operation Harvest Festival.

At the end of 1944, Hantke was reassigned to the Stutthof concentration camp.

== Postwar life and prosecution ==
Hantke survived the war and settled in Germany. Hantke was convicted in Hamburg in 1961, and was released in 1967.

On 5 December 1973, 66-year old Hantke and co-defendant Georg Michalsen were put on trial in Hamburg for the murder of thousands of Jews during the liquidation of the Warsaw Ghetto. They were also accused of sending 300,000 Jews to their deaths in Treblinka. Hantke was convicted of killing four Jews between 1942 and 1943. After Hantke's conviction, the court sentenced him to life imprisonment.
