= Wieliczka =

- Town
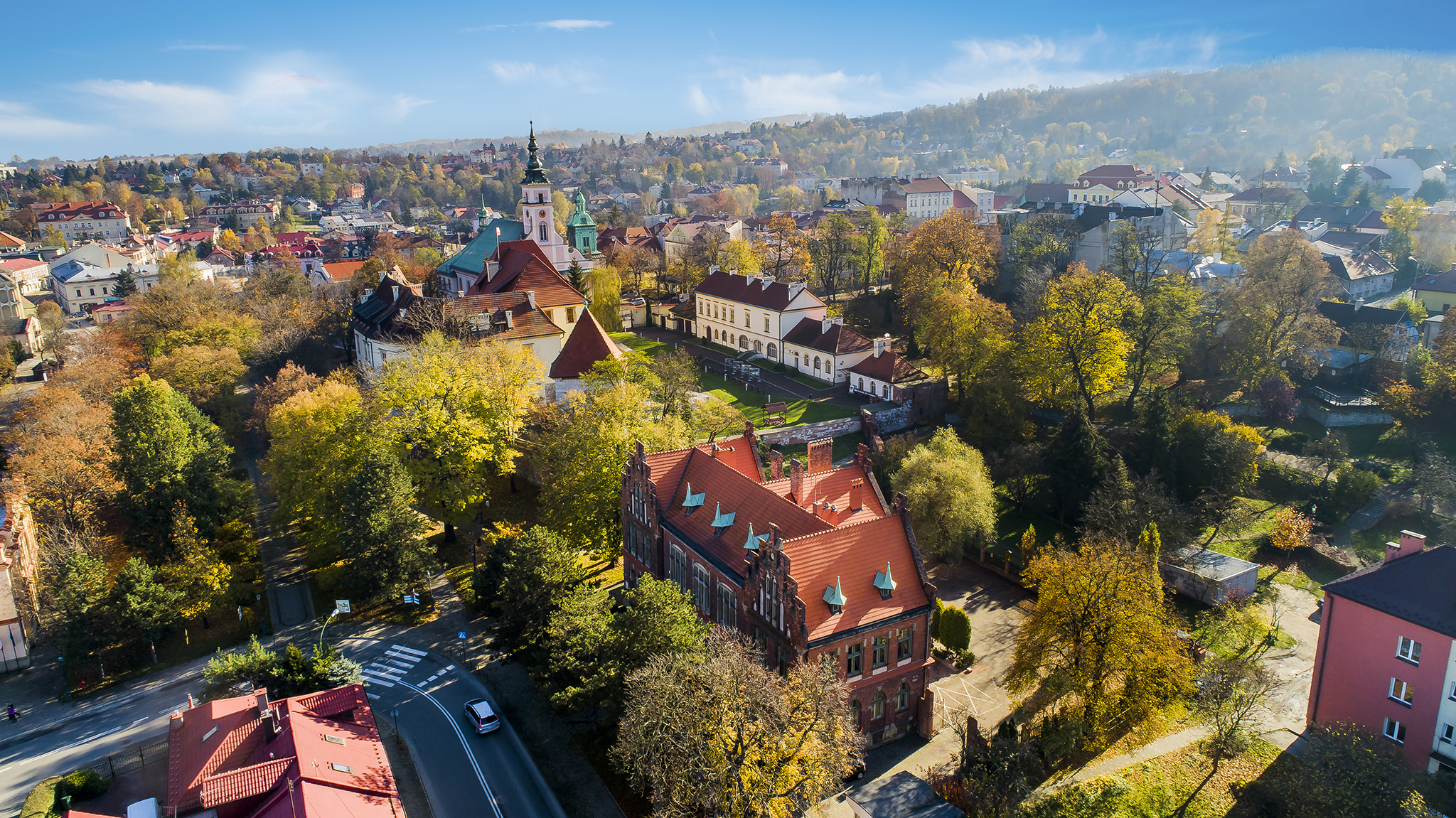
- Panorama of Wieliczka

- Flag Coat of arms

- Location within Poland
- Coordinates: 49°59′22″N 20°3′58″E
- Country: Poland
- Voivodeship: Lesser Poland
- County: Wieliczka
- Gmina: Wieliczka
- Established: 1123–1127
- Town rights: 1290

Government
  - Mayor: Rafał Ślęczka

Area
  - Total: 13.41 km^{2} (5.18 sq mi)

Population (2023)
  - Total: 27,845
  - Density: 2,076/km^{2} (5,378/sq mi)
- Time zone: UTC+1 (CET)
  - Summer (DST): UTC+2 (CEST)
- Postal code: 32-020
- Area code: +48 12
- Car plates: KWI
- Website: wieliczka.pl

Wieliczka (pronounced [vʲɛˈlʲit͡ʂka]; Latin: Magnum Sal) is a historic town in southern Poland, situated within the Kraków metropolitan area in Lesser Poland Voivodeship since 1999. The town was initially founded in 1290 by Premislaus II of Poland. Nowadays, it is mostly known for the Wieliczka Salt Mine, declared a UNESCO World Heritage Site in 1978, and the historic old town core which was listed as one of National Polish Monuments in 1994. The population in 2023 was estimated at 27,845.

== Geographic location ==
The city of Wieliczka lies in the south central part of Poland, within the Małopolska (Lesser Poland) province. The city is located 13 km (8.1 mi) to the southeast of Kraków and not far from the town of Niepołomice. The Wieliczka Salt Mine – one of the world's oldest operating salt mines, has been established on significant salt deposits which are also present in nearby Bochnia.

The town lies in a valley between two ridges that stretch from west to east: south Wieliczka foothills, north Bogucice sands, including the Wieliczka-Gdów Upland. The south ridge is higher, while the northern ridge leads to national road 94. Near the town lies the A4 highway (E40 European route), which connects Kraków with Poland's south western and south eastern regions. Despite the small area, the city's relative altitude accounts for more than 137 –m–: the highest mountain reaches 361,8 metres above the sea, and the lowest point lies at an altitude of 224 metres above sea level.

== Culture ==
Wieliczka, as well as the nearby village of Lednica Górna are among the last places in Poland where the Easter tradition of Siuda Baba is still practised.

== History ==
=== Medieval times ===
The first settlers were probably from the Celtic tribes. In later years they were driven out by the West Slavic or Lechitic clans. The importance of mining deposits arose after the capital of Poland was moved from Gniezno to Kraków by Casimir I the Restorer in the 11th century. However, further development of the mining practices was abruptly halted by the Mongol invasion, which destroyed Kraków and its surroundings in the 13th century. The area was subsequently populated with migrating Germans, who called the settlement Gross Salz (English: Grand/Great Salt) and from which the old Polish name Wielka Sól was derived. With time, the name evolved into Wieliczka, although the name Wielka Sól remained in official use, particularly in royal seals and documents.

After the 1252 discovery of large salt and potassium deposits across southern Poland, the extraction of salt began on a much broader scale. In the year 1289, Henryk IV Probus, then Lord of Kraków, issued a document authorising brothers Jescho and Isenbold to expand the town. Duke and future king Premislaus II granted Wieliczka town privileges in 1290.

=== 17th to 18th century ===
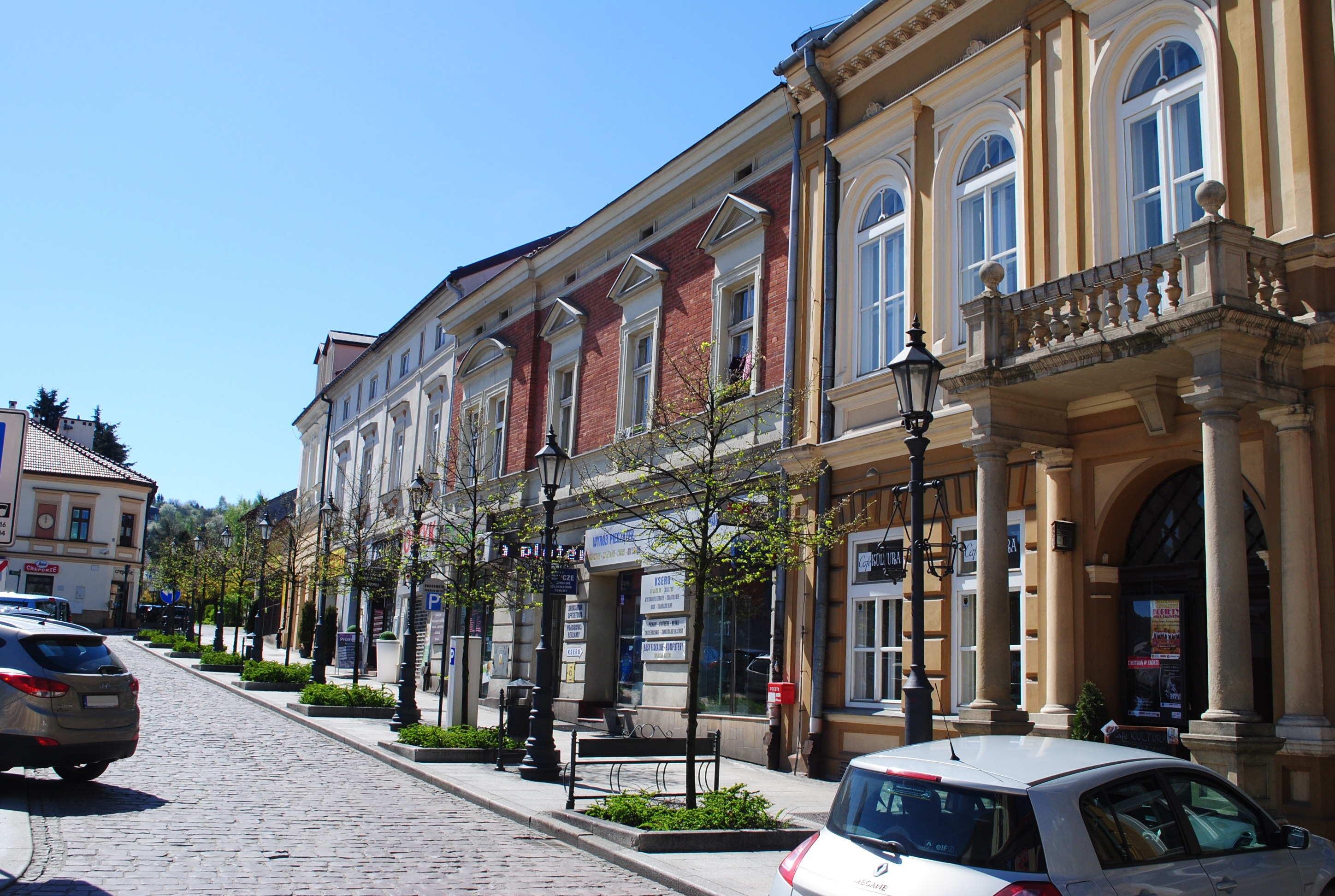
Wieliczka market square townhouses

In 1651, the population of Wieliczka was decimated by a plague. In the years 1655–1660, at the time of the Swedish Deluge, the city was in economic decline. The mine was plundered and burned by the Swedes and Swedish troops guarded the mine and the taxes were raised upon the locals. Gabriel Wojniłłowicz along with Jerzy Sebastian Lubomirski proceeded to organize approximately 3,000 people which took part in the liberation of Wieliczka, Bochnia and Wiśnicz. The battle took place in Kamionna, Lesser Poland Voivodeship, where the Poles emerged victorious.

=== 18th to 19th century ===
After the First Partition of Poland in 1772, Wieliczka became part of the Austrian-led Habsburg monarchy. After the Polish victory in the Austro-Polish War of 1809, Wieliczka was regained by Poles and included within the short-lived Polish Duchy of Warsaw. The Habsburgs regained the city after the fall of the Duchy and its partition by the Congress of Vienna. The town then became part of the semi-autonomous province of Galicia. Under the multicultural Austrian Empire, many German, Hungarian, Croatian and Transylvanian miners settled in Wieliczka, thus changing the ethnic composition of the city. In 1828, Fryderyk Chopin visited the town. After the outbreak of the Kraków uprising in 1846, the rebellious miners seized power at the salt mines. With progressing industrialization, the town developed into a small city, which was now renowned for its salt production and output throughout the Empire.

=== 20th to 21st century ===
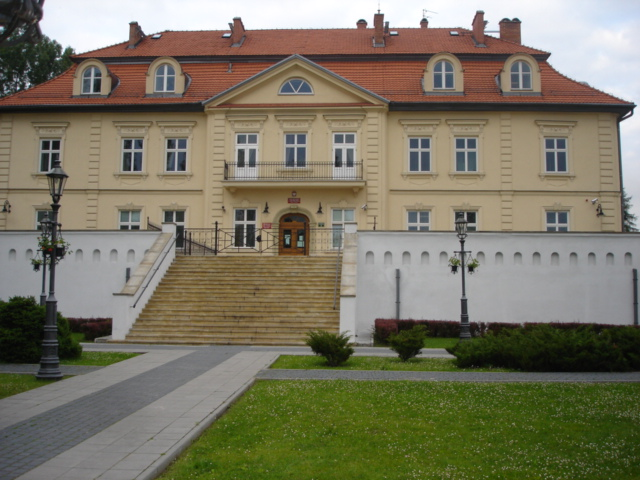
A branch of the Institute of National Remembrance at the Konopków Palace

Only by the end of the 19th century, the Galician authorities began investing in public housing. However, the city expanded with private investments, wealthy entrepreneurs built mining colonies (organized settlements for families of mine workers) and power plants (supplied electricity not only to the mine, but also to the town).

In the inter-war period, Wieliczka's total population increased which encouraged territorial expansion; local villages were incorporated into town borders and new residential districts were erected in the 1920s to meet the demands of the growing population. However, the town also witnessed the 1933 miners' strike, which took place due to the reduction of wages by 13%.

During the first days of World War II, on 7 September 1939, the German Wehrmacht entered Wieliczka. They immediately began to persecute the Jewish population of around 1500, robbing and plundering. During the next two and a half years, they also brought to Wieliczka hundreds of Jews from other towns in the area, including from the Kraków Ghetto after the opening of a ghetto in the Klasno district. In total, as many as 11,000 Jews lived in the ghetto by the time of deportation in 1942. The town, especially the places Jews lived, became severely overcrowded and the population impoverished. In August 1942, all the Jewish population was rounded up. About 700 were taken to a nearby forest where they were shot. Others were killed in the town. Some 700 young men were taken to Pustkow and other forced labor camps. The rest were forced onto trains and sent to the killing camp at Belzec where they were murdered by gas on arrival. Very few Wieliczka Jews survived until liberation.

On 21 January 1945, the Soviet Red Army liberated Wieliczka from the Nazis. During the fighting, 138 Soviet soldiers were killed.

In 1994, the city was listed in the Register of Historic Monuments of Poland.

== Sport ==
- Górnik Wieliczka – football club

== Economy ==
Wieliczka is the headquarters of the Polish clothing company 4F.

== International relations ==
=== Twin towns – Sister cities ===
Wieliczka is twinned with:

- Bergkamen, Germany
- Saint-Andre-lez-Lille, France
- Sesto Fiorentino, Italy
- Litovel, Czech Republic

== Notable residents ==
- Magdalena Bendzisławska, a 17th century barber-surgeon and the likely the first woman surgeon in Poland.
- Tadeusz Ajdukiewicz (1852–1916), realist painter
- Władysław Skoczylas (1883–1934), watercolorist, woodcutter, sculptor and art teacher
- Esther Hamerman (1886–1977), American painter, born in Wieliczka, eventually moved to Vienna
- Adam Musiał (1948–2020), football player and football manager
- Paweł Mąciwoda (b. 1967), Polish bassist, member of the German rock band Scorpions
- Artur Szpilka (b. 1989), professional boxer
- Jan-Krzysztof Duda (b. 1998), chess grandmaster
- Christoph Zielinski (b. 1952), Austrian physician, onkologist, scientist and researcher, born in Wieliczka

== Gallery ==
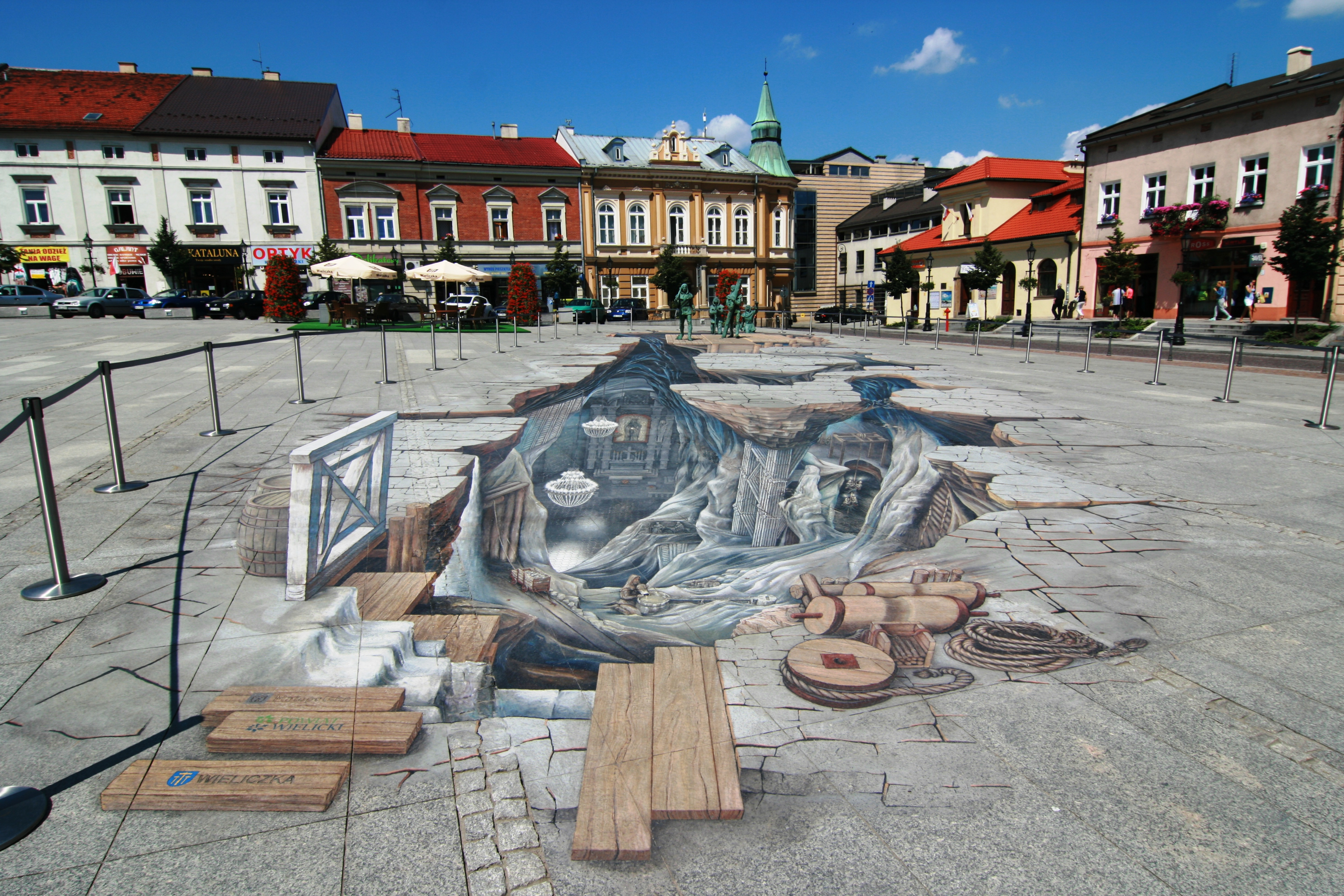
The Market Square

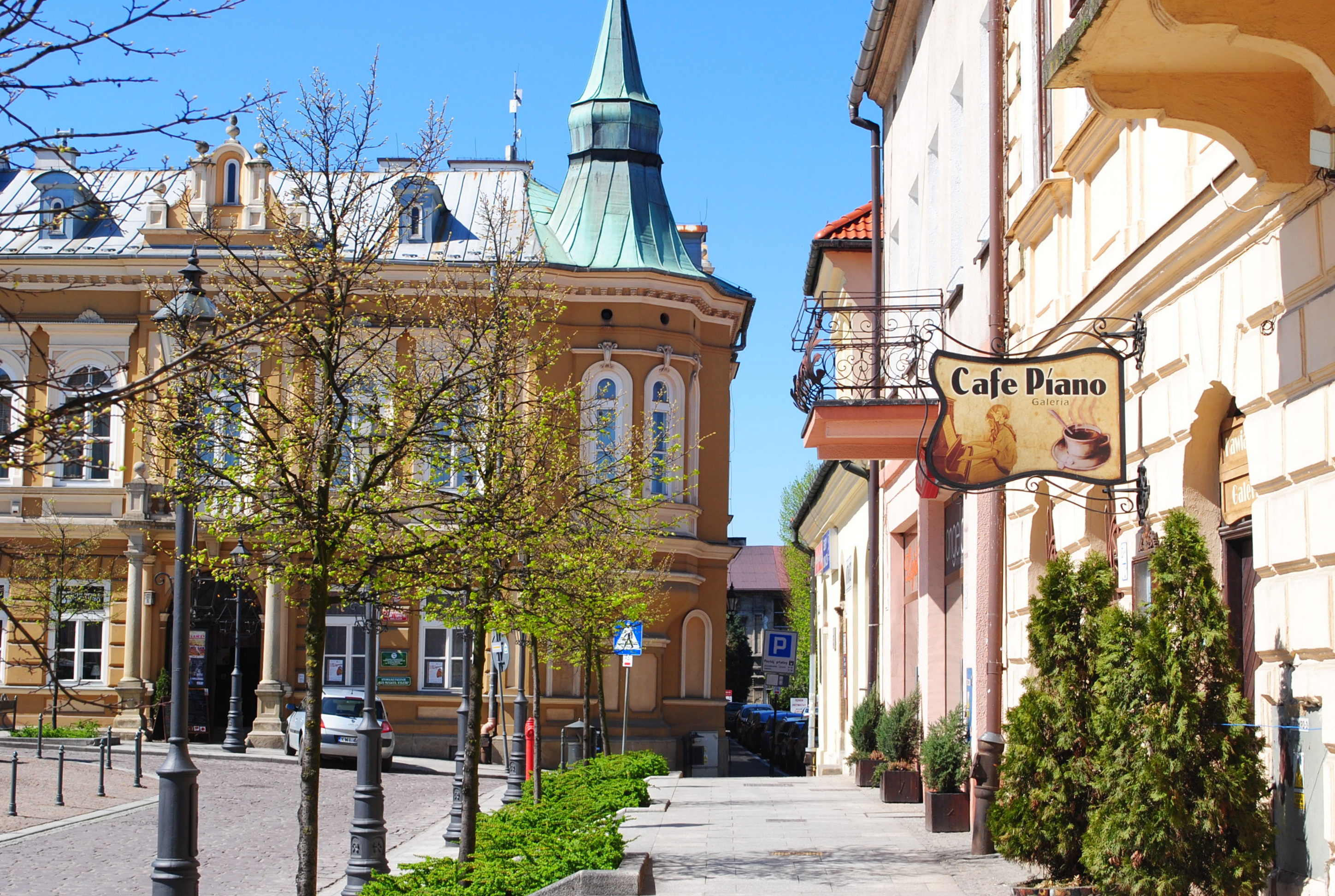
Tenement houses at the Market Square

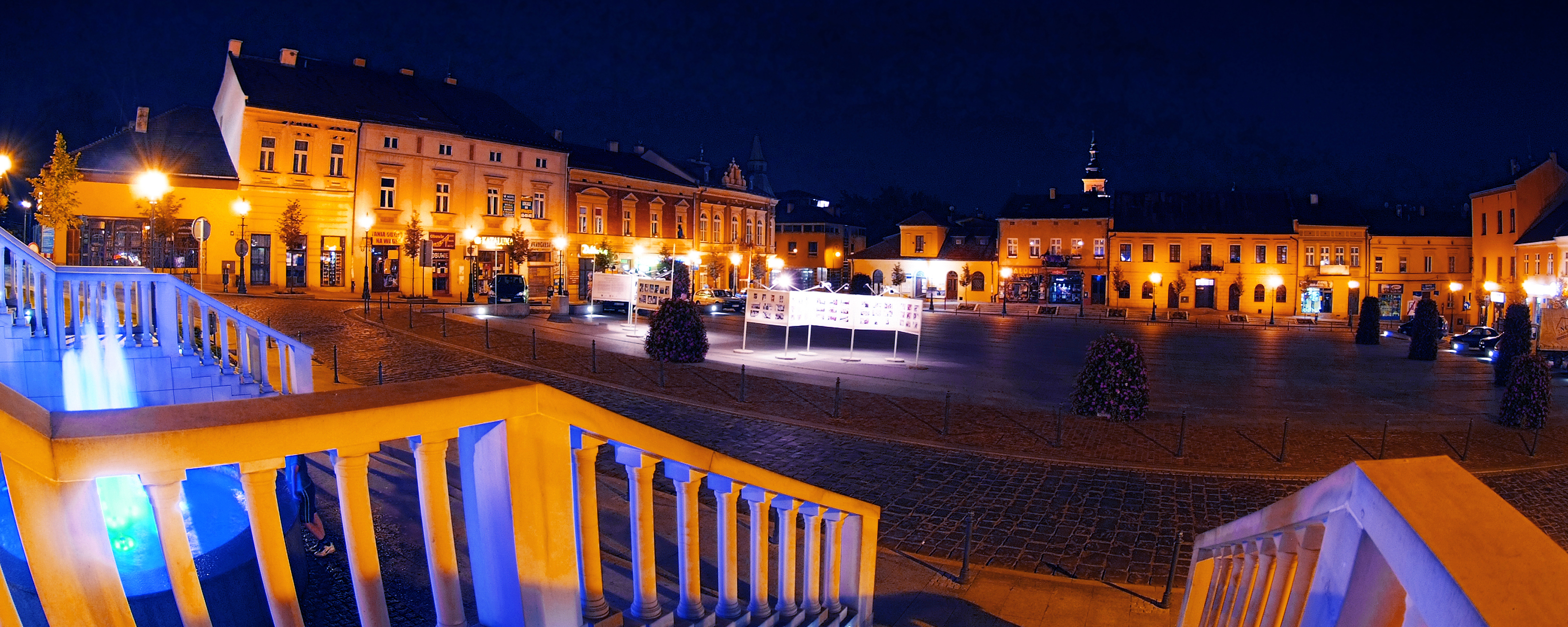
Market Square at night

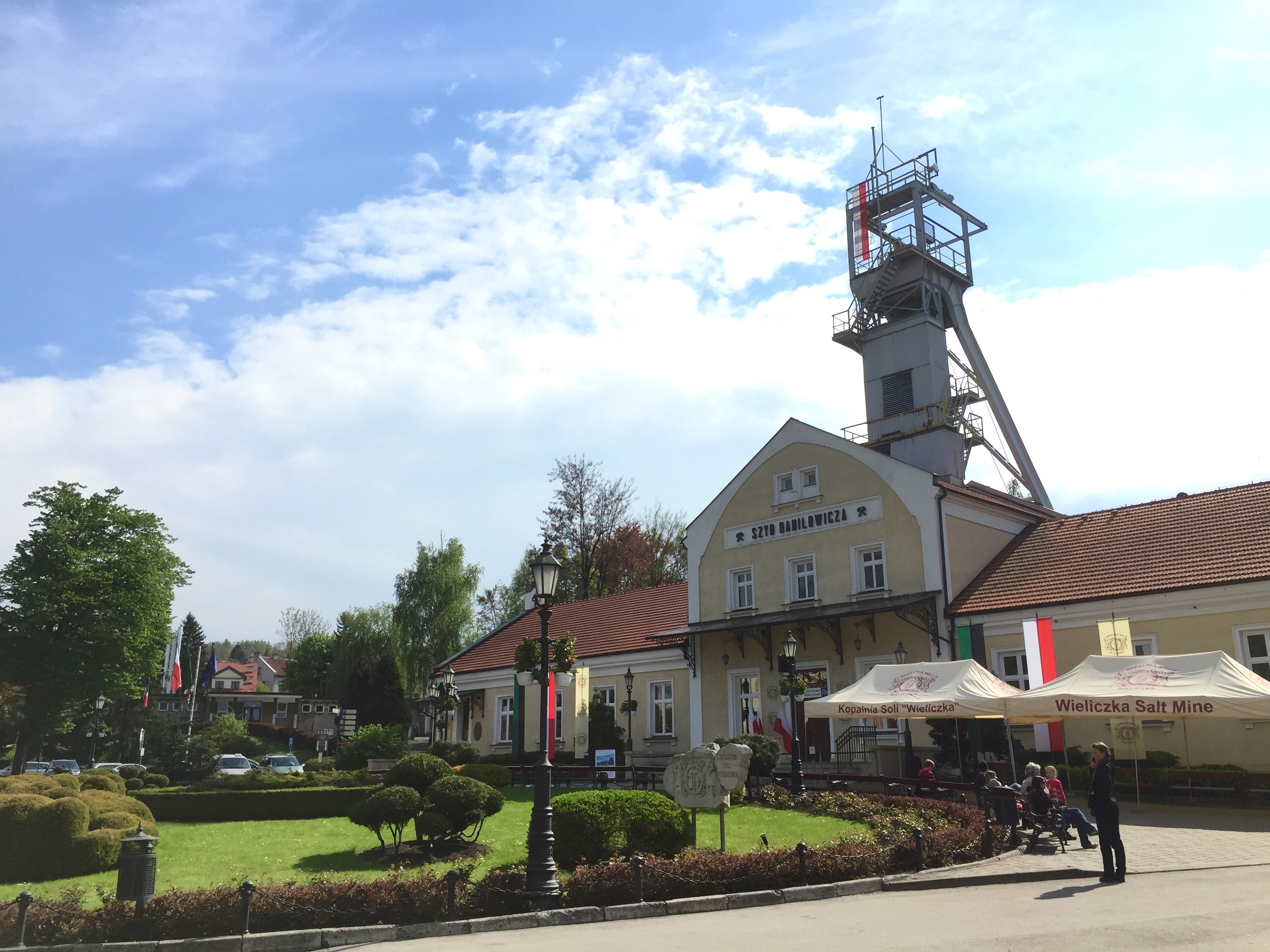
Wieliczka Salt Mine, a UNESCO World Heritage Site

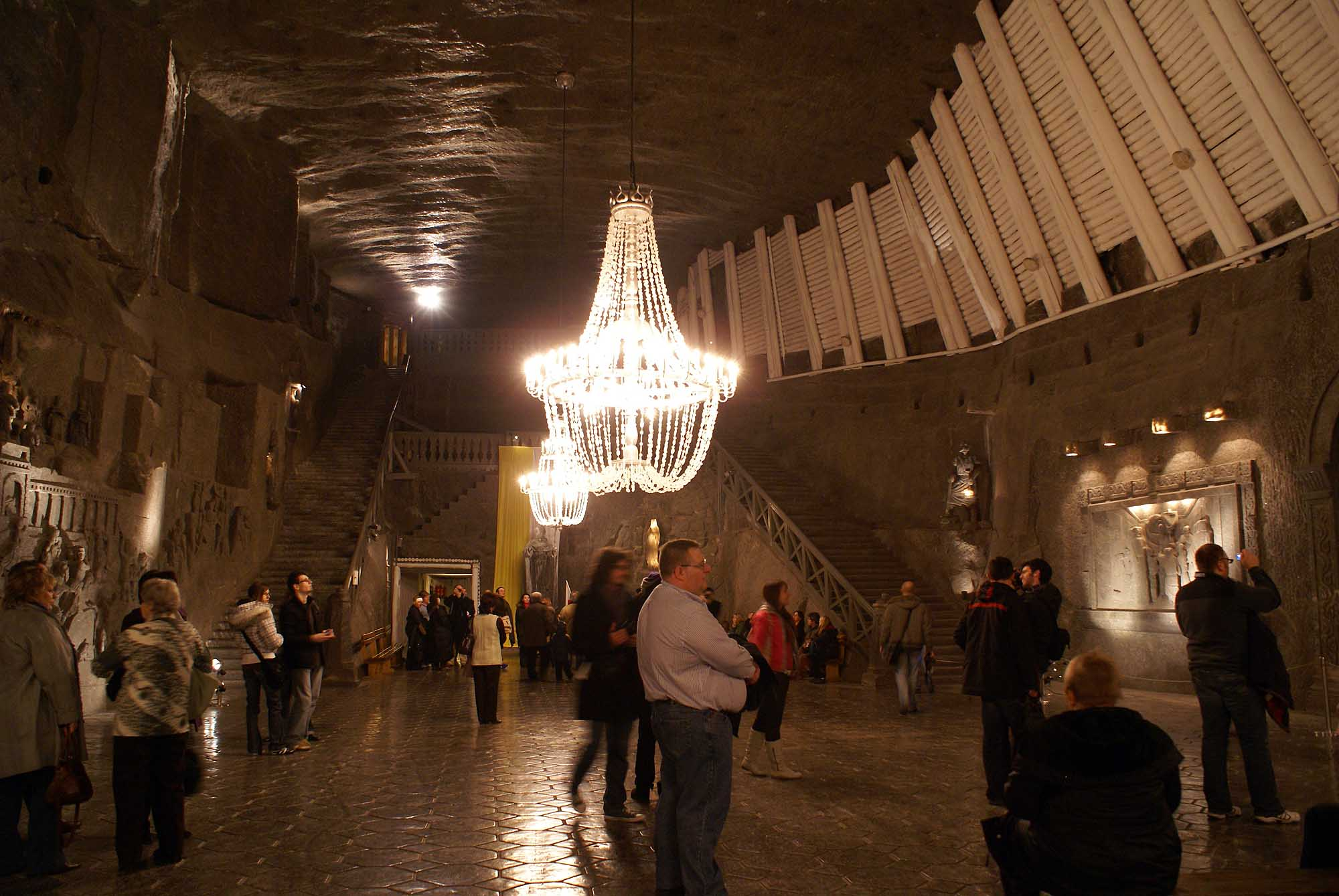
Interior of the mine

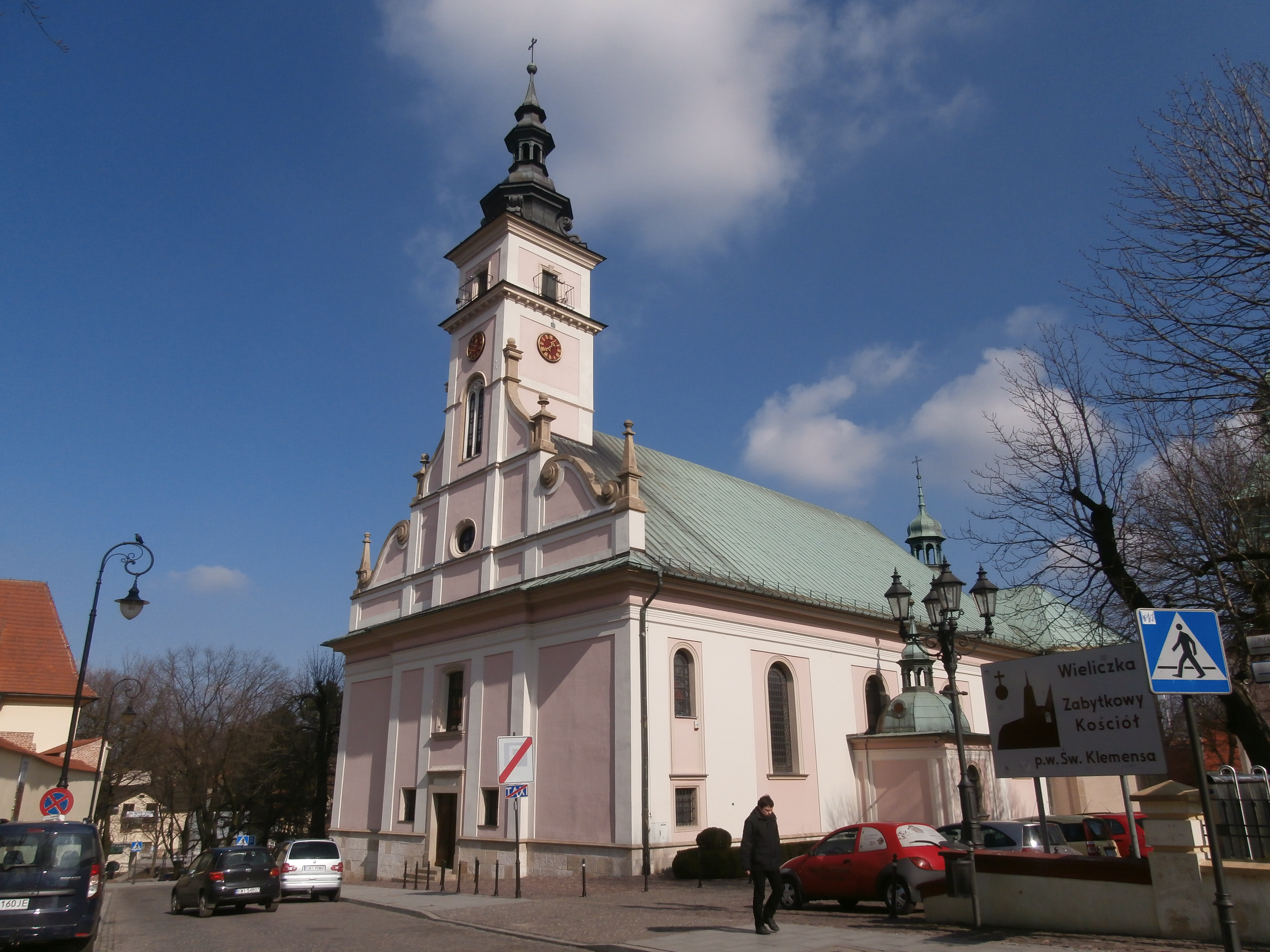
St. Clement's Church (pl)

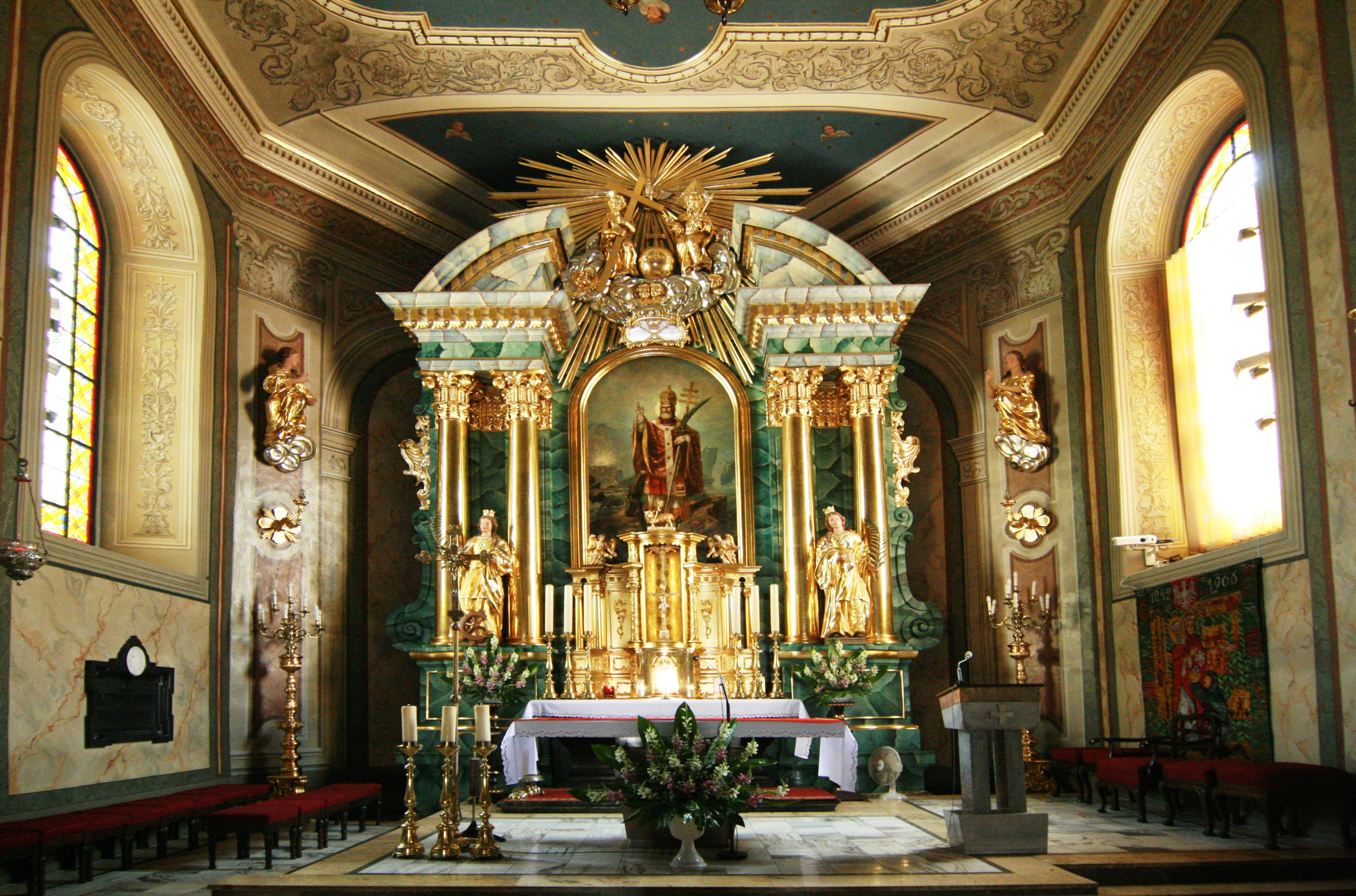
Interior of St. Clement's Church

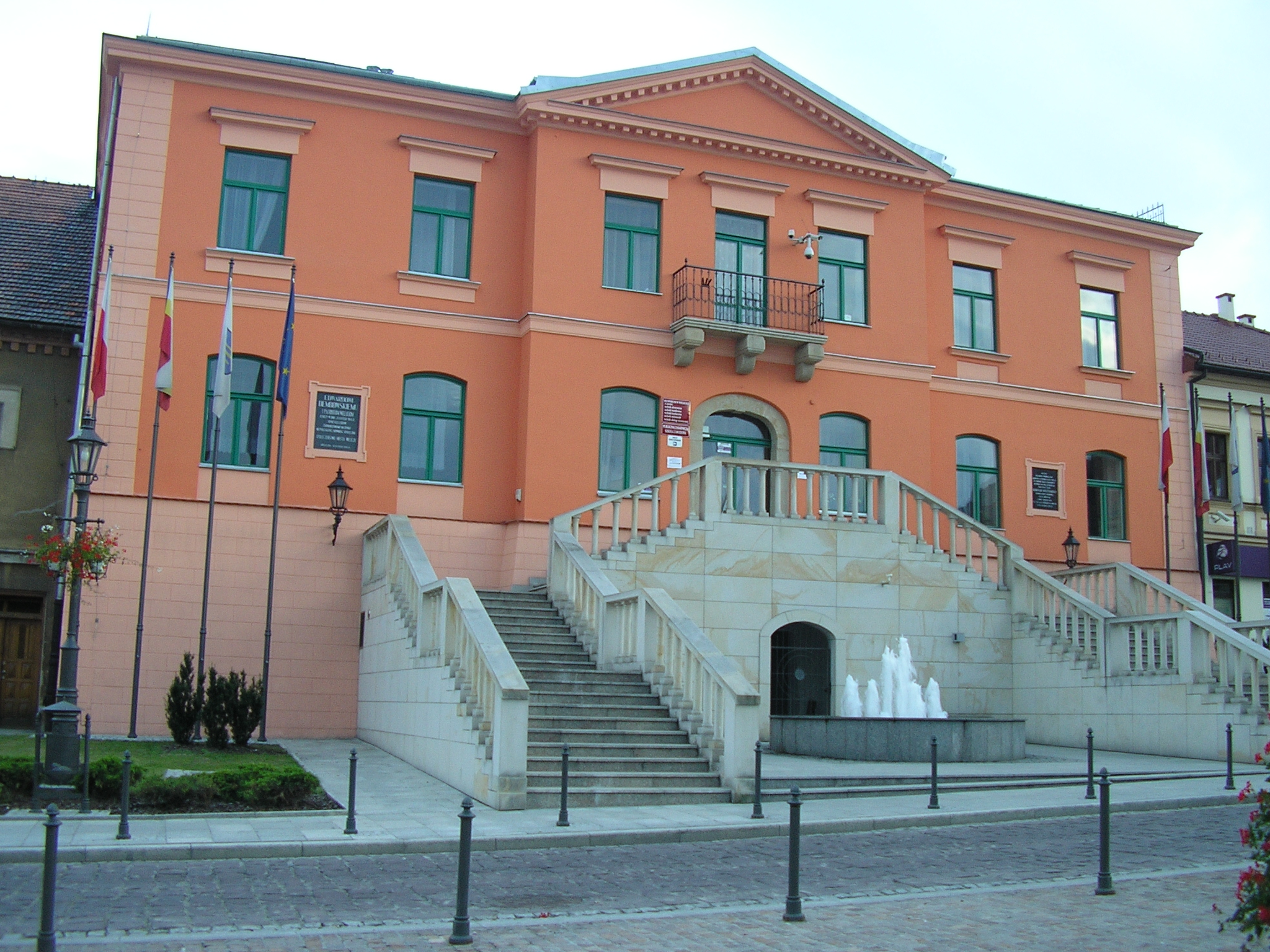
Przychodzki Palace

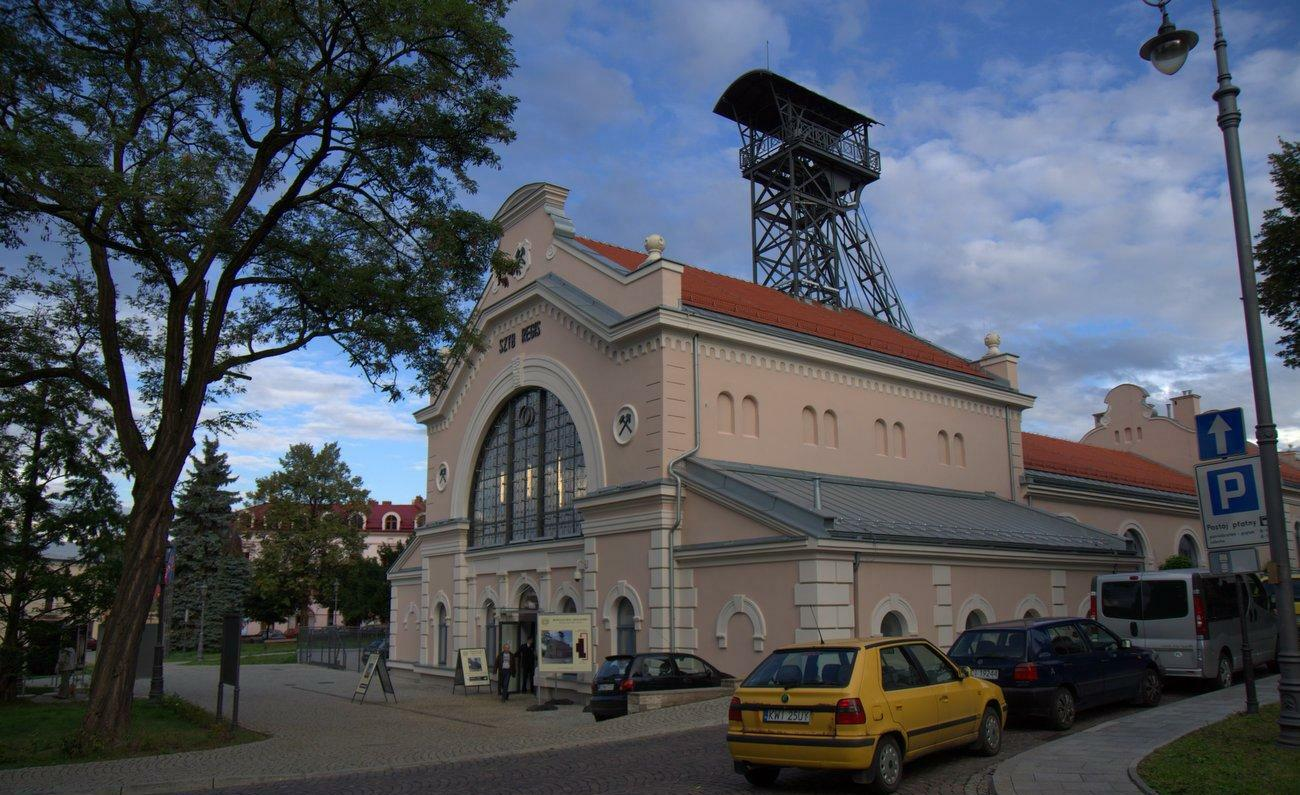
Regis Shaft

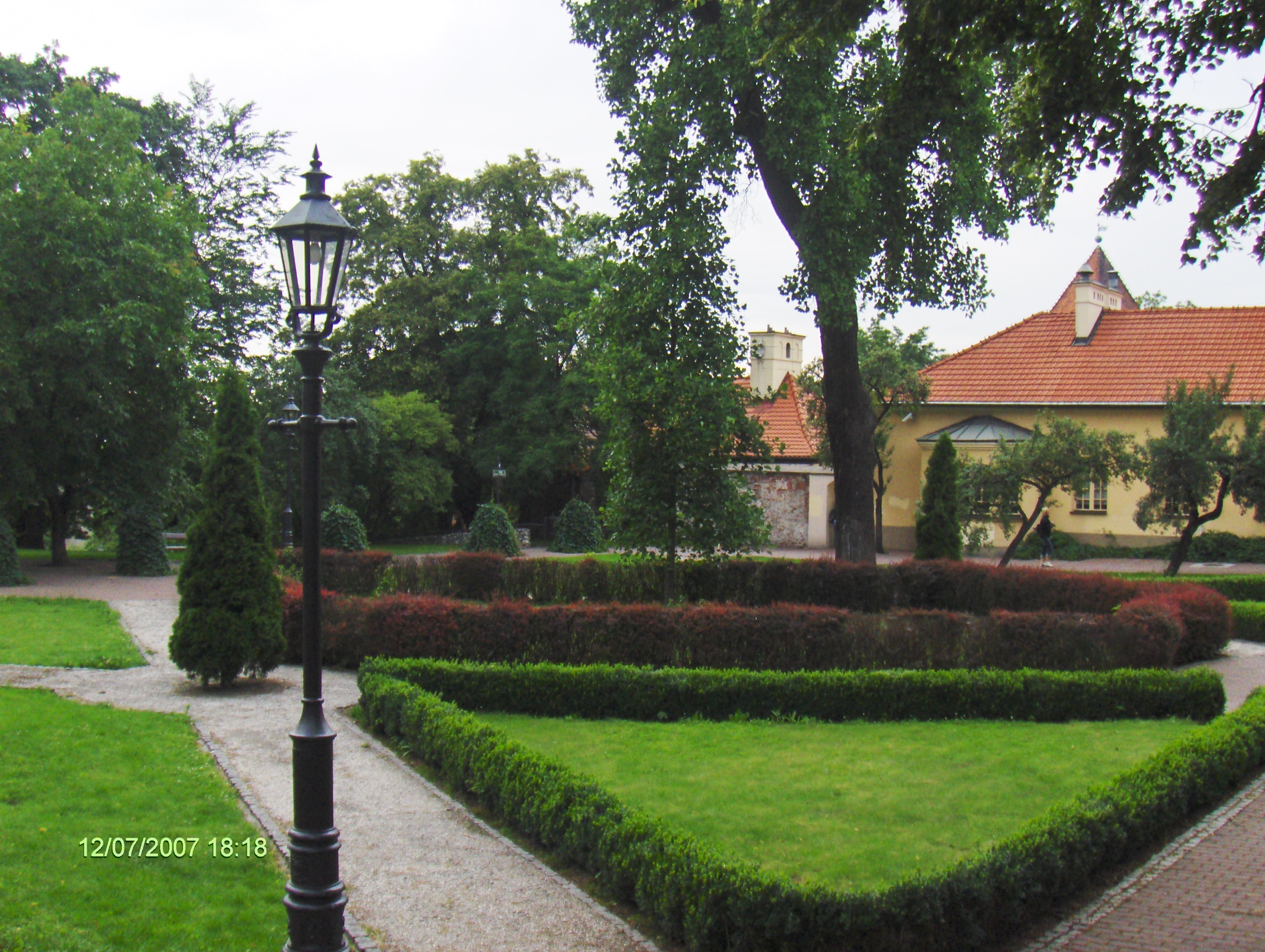
Regional House Garden

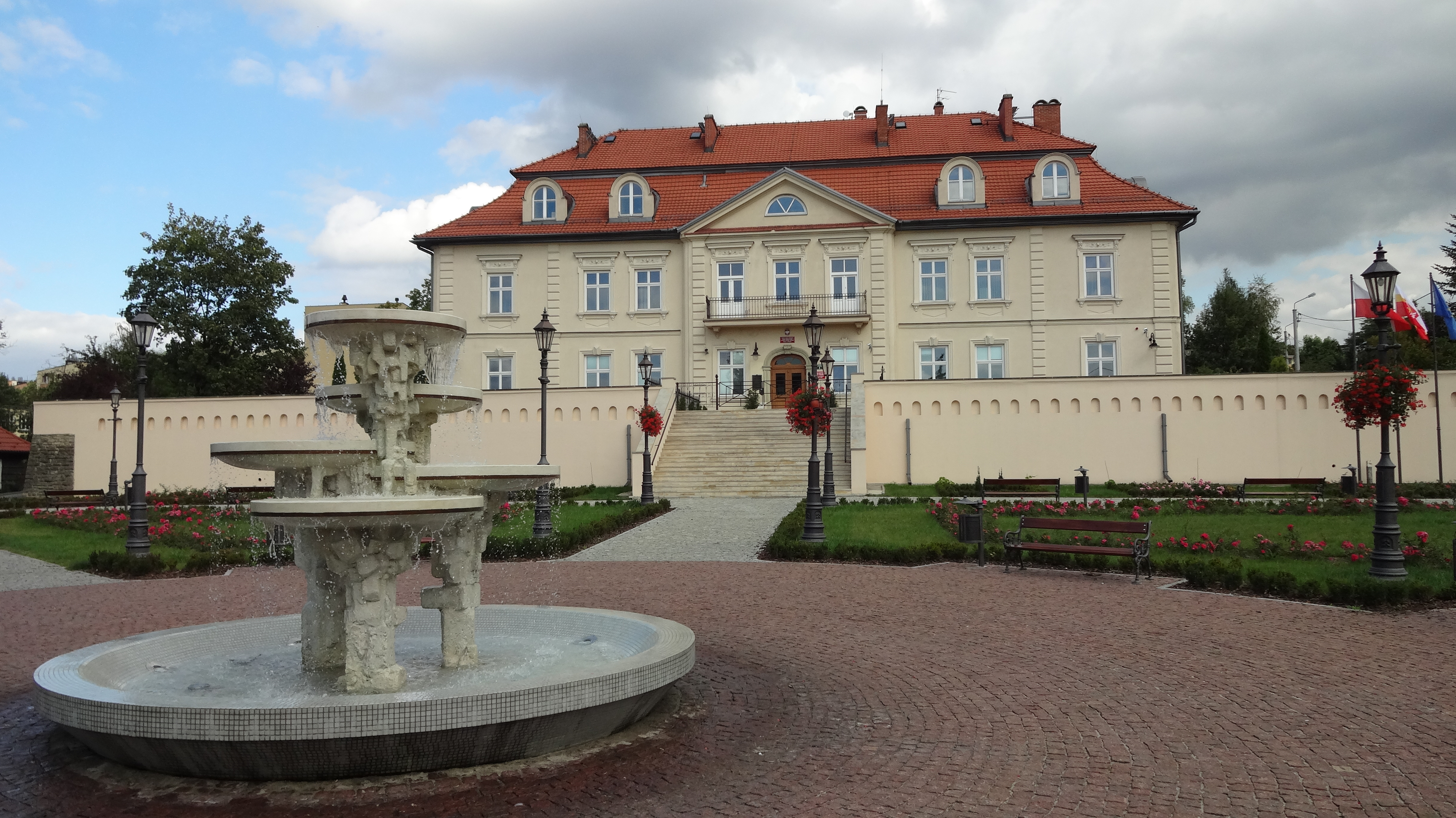
Konopków Palace

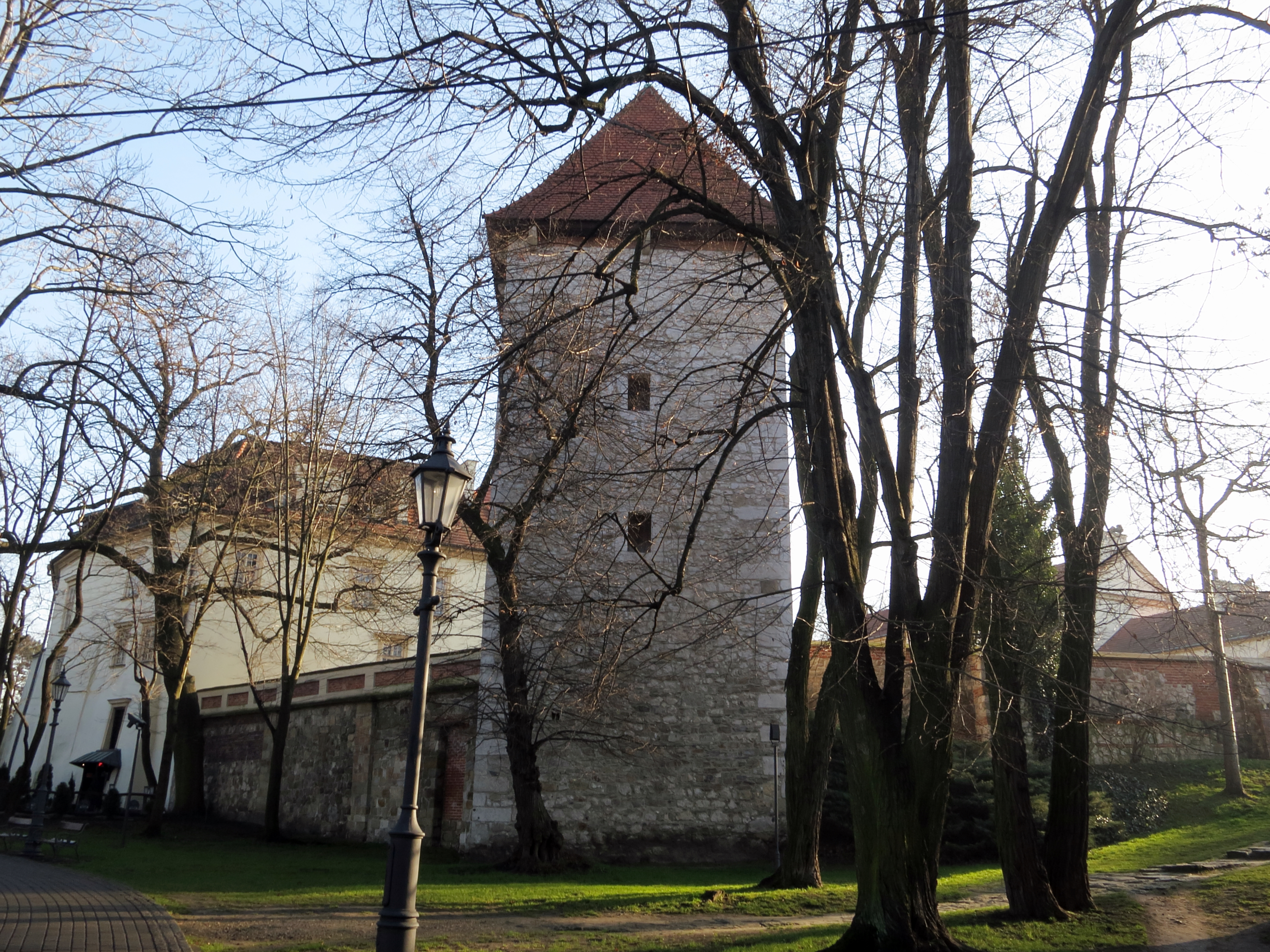
Żupny Castle

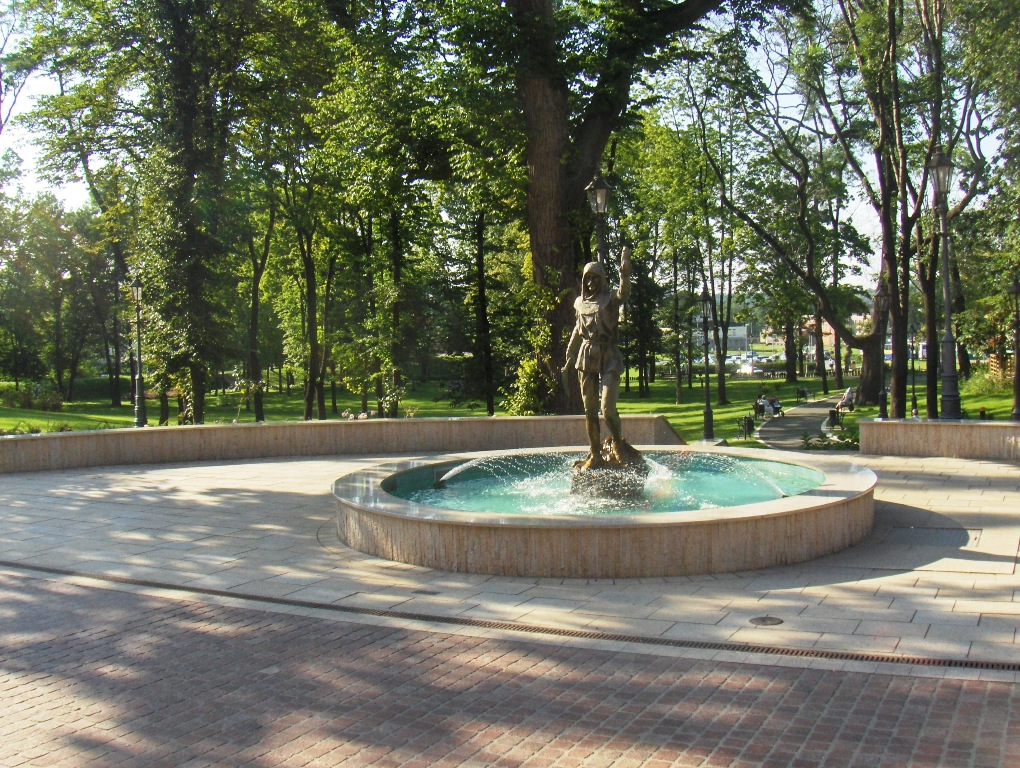
Saint Kinga's Park

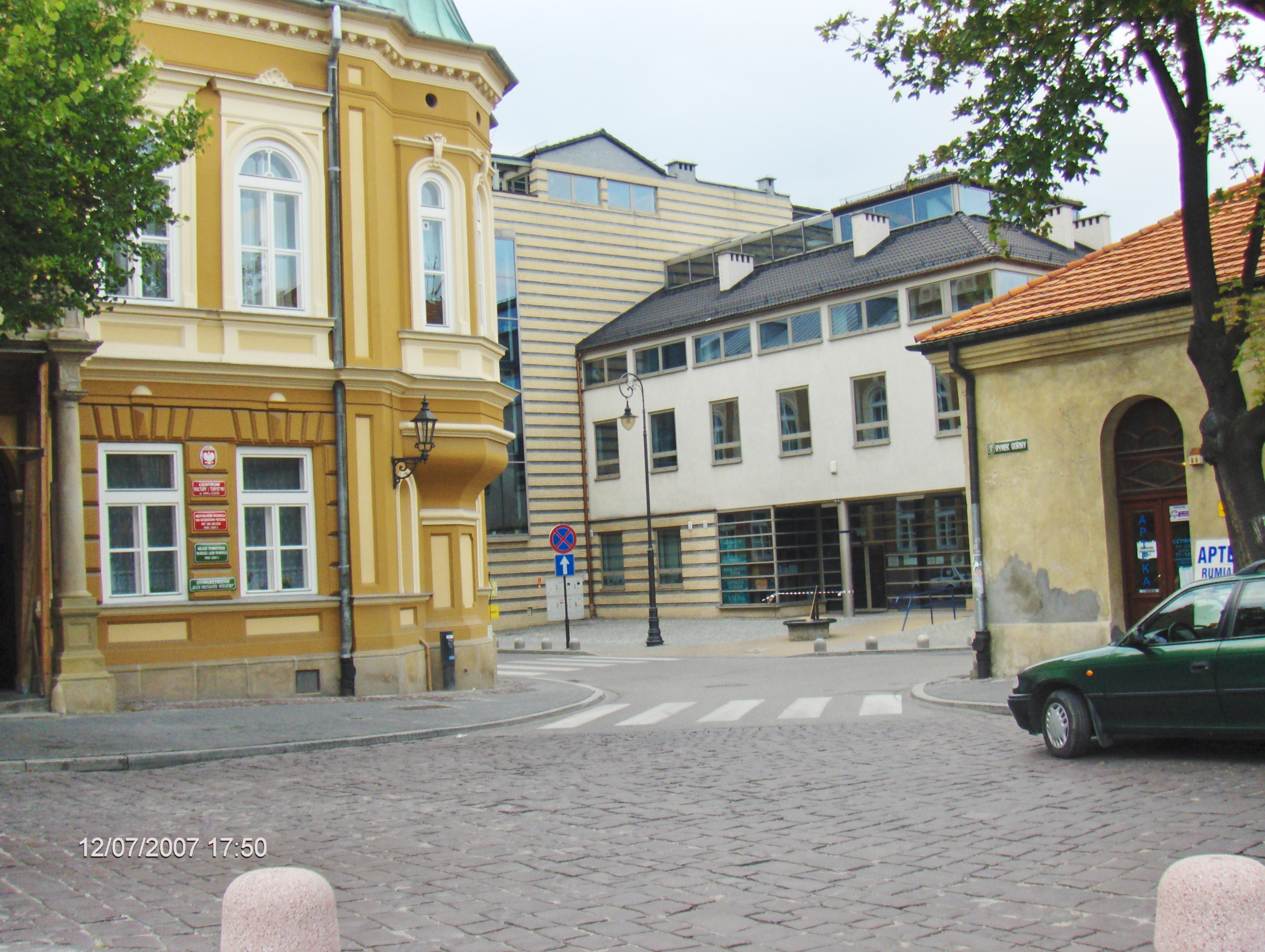
Town Centre

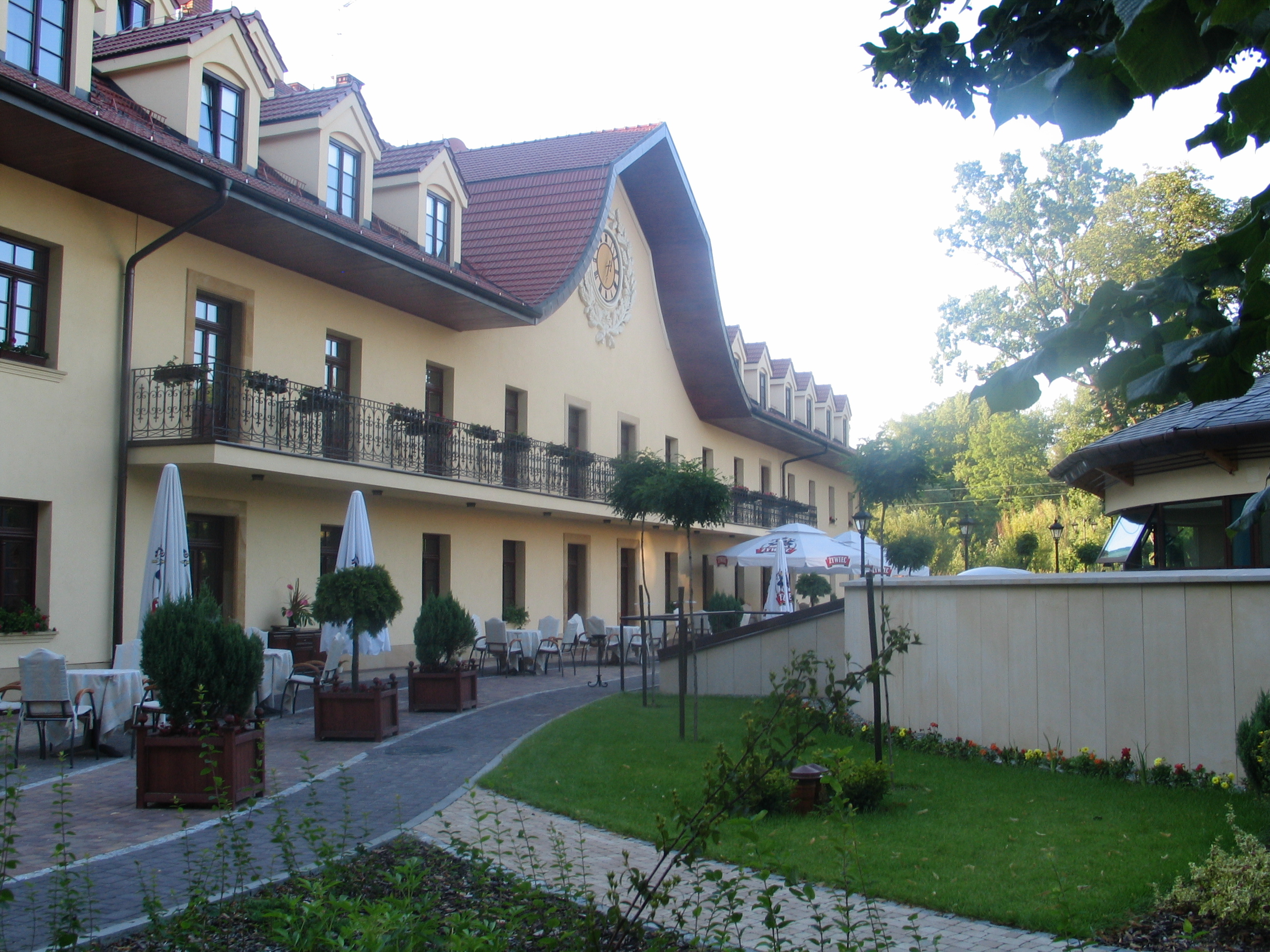
Turówka Hotel

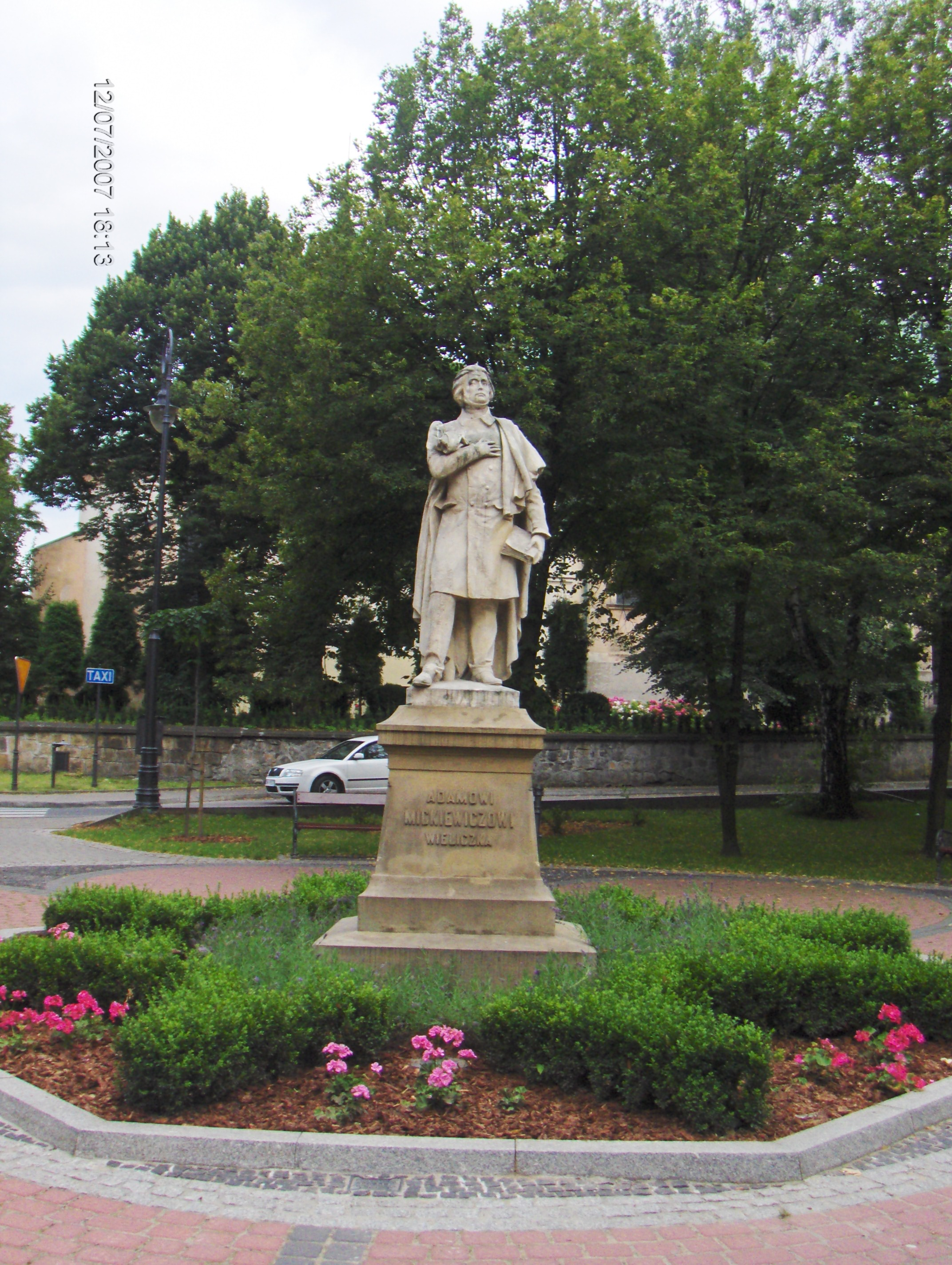
Adam Mickiewicz Monument

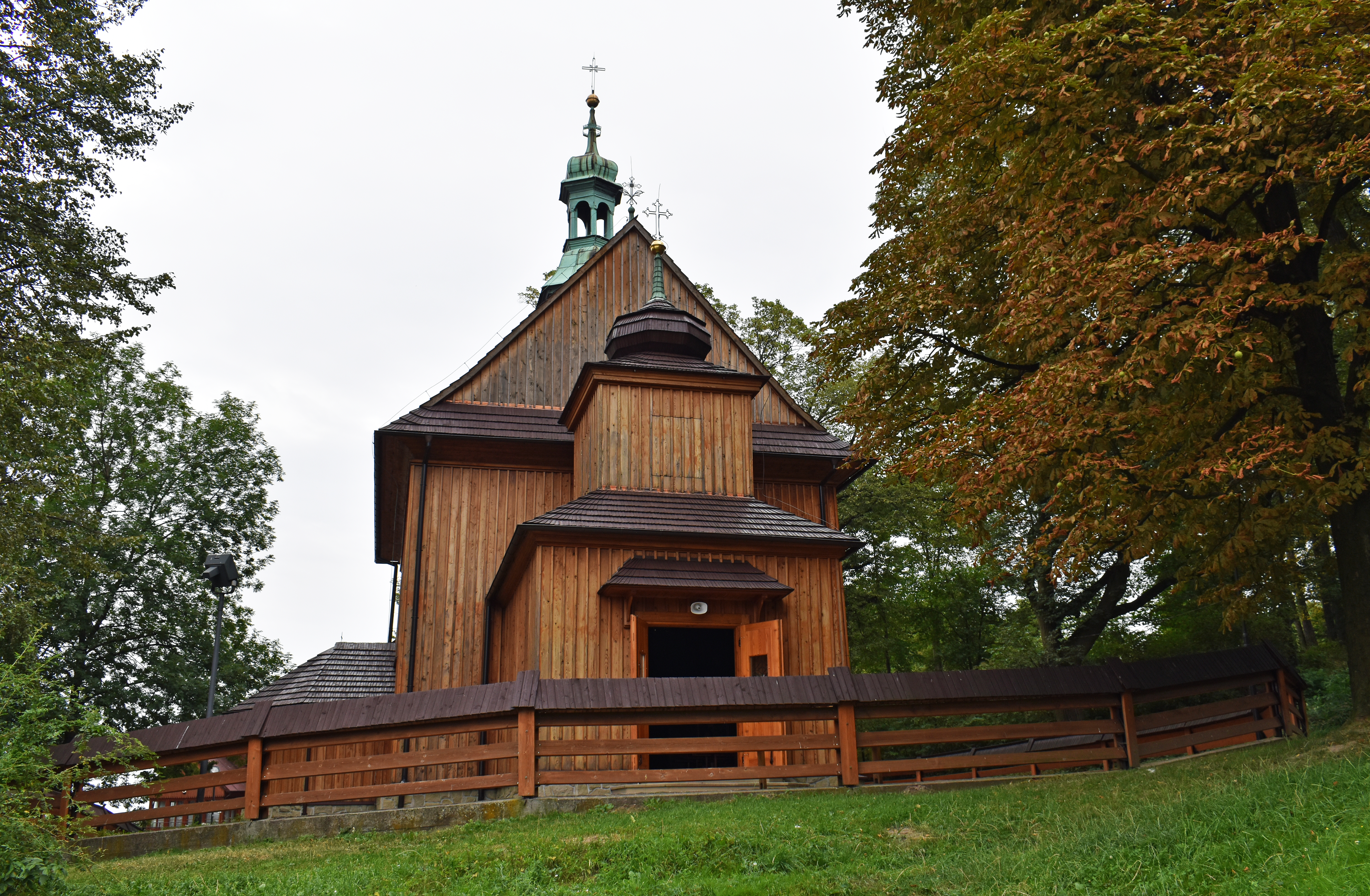
Church of St. Sebastian

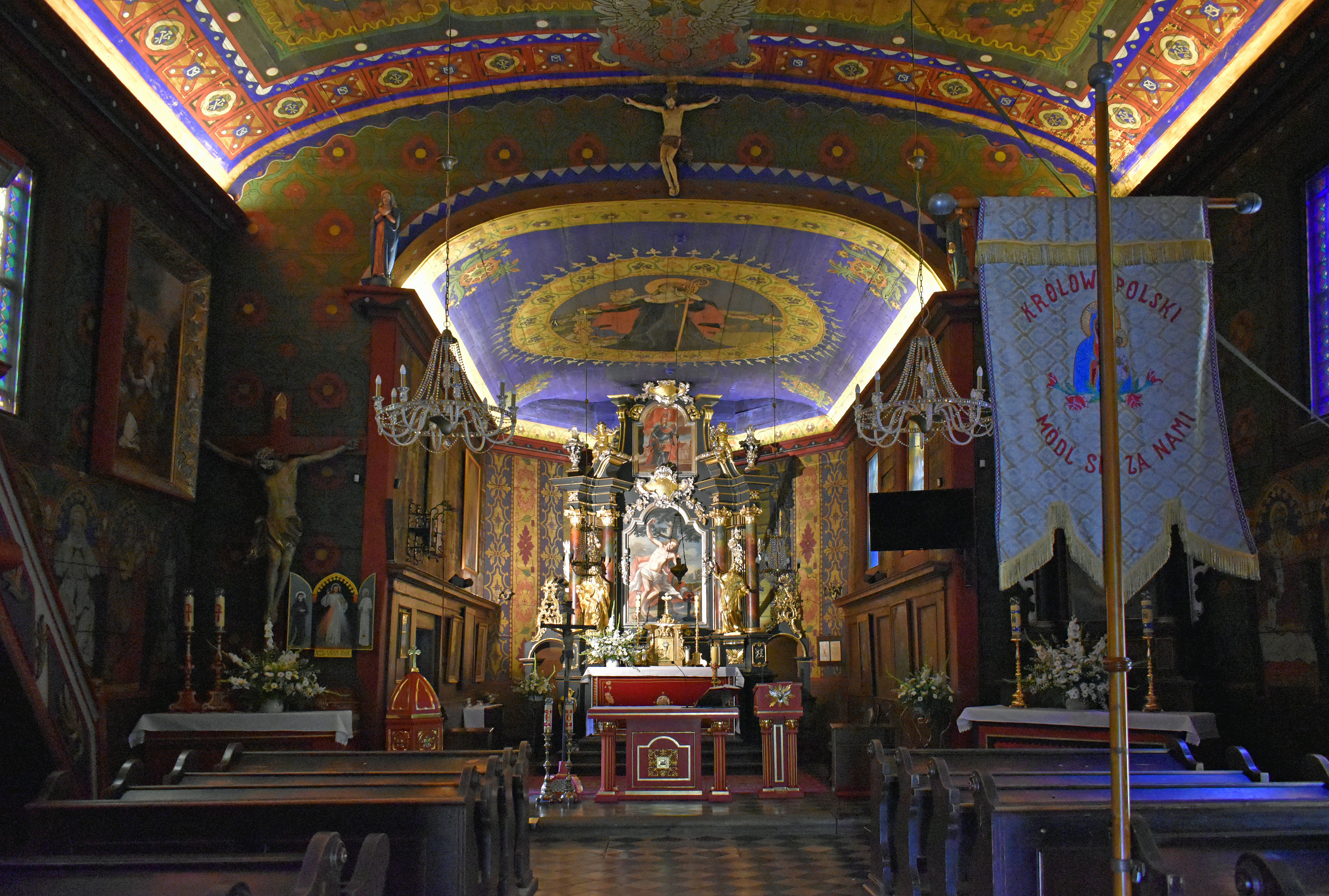
Interior of Saint Sebastian Church

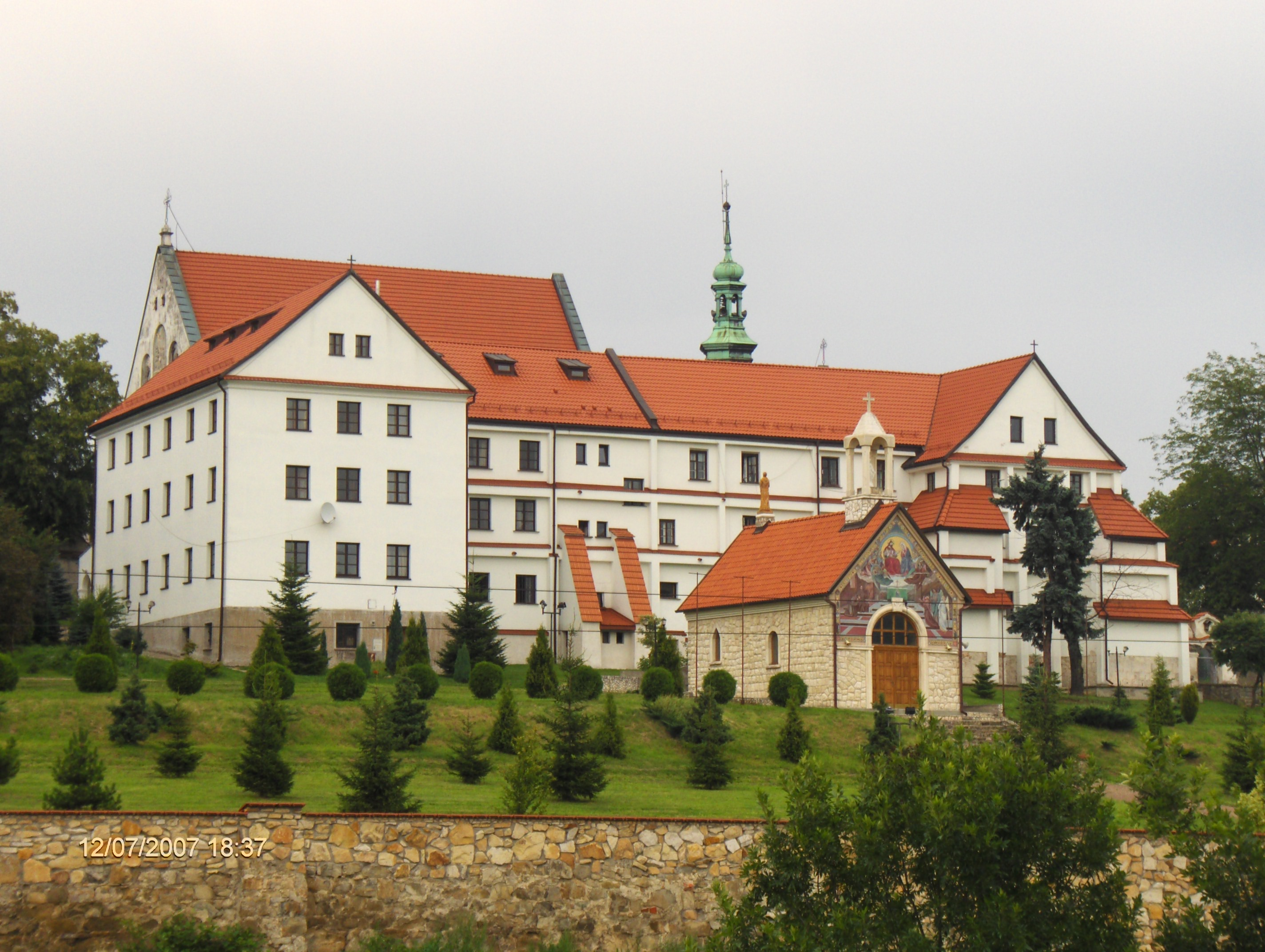
Franciscan Monastery

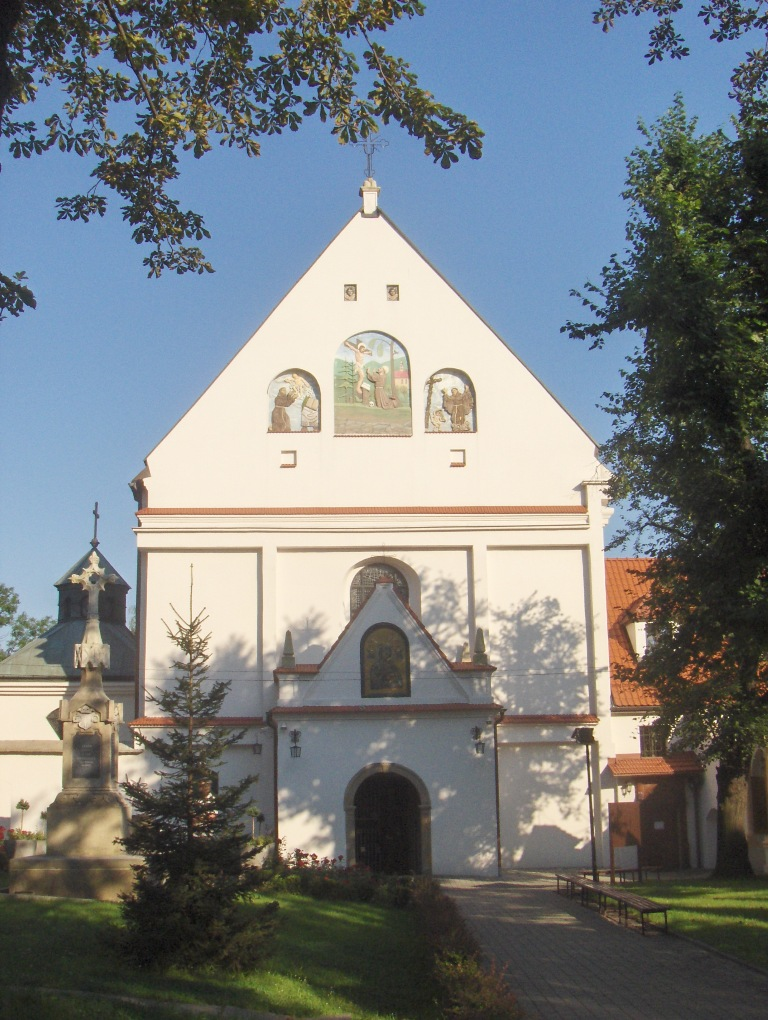
The monastery courtyard

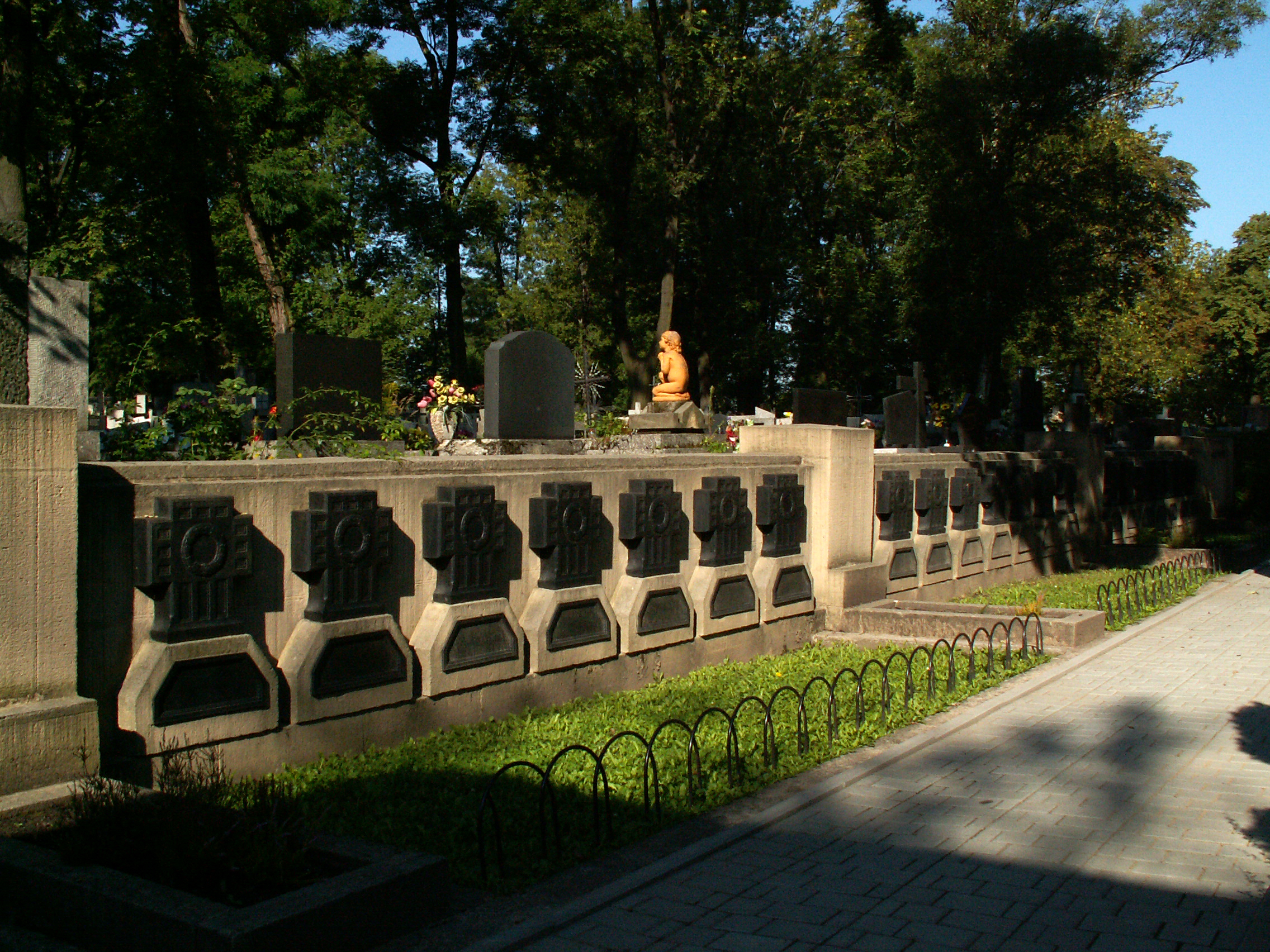
WWI Military Cemetery

== See also ==
- List of World Heritage Sites of Poland
- Bochnia Salt Mine
