= Kunice =

Kunice may refer to:

== Czech Republic ==
- Kunice (Blansko District), a municipality and village in the South Moravian Region
- Kunice (Prague-East District), a municipality and village in the Central Bohemian Region

== Poland ==
- Kunice, Lesser Poland Voivodeship (south Poland)
- Kunice, Łódź Voivodeship (central Poland)
- Kunice, Lower Silesian Voivodeship (south-west Poland)
- Kunice, Słubice County in Lubusz Voivodeship (west Poland)
- Kunice, Świętokrzyskie Voivodeship (south-central Poland)
- Kunice, Żary (west Poland)

== Transport ==
- Kunice railway station, Lower Silesian Voivodeship

== Serbia ==
- Kunice (Valjevo), a settlement in the Valjevo municipality
