= Piotrówek =

Piotrówek may refer to the following places in Poland:

- Piotrówek, Legnica County in Lower Silesian Voivodeship (south-west Poland)
- Piotrówek, Wrocław County in Lower Silesian Voivodeship (south-west Poland)
- Piotrówek, Masovian Voivodeship (east-central Poland)
