= Spalona =

Spalona may refer to the following places in Poland:

- Spalona, Kłodzko County in Gmina Bystrzyca Kłodzka, Kłodzko County in Lower Silesian Voivodeship (SW Poland)
- Spalona, Legnica County in Gmina Kunice, Legnica County in Lower Silesian Voivodeship (SW Poland)
