= Jaśkowice Legnickie =

- Village
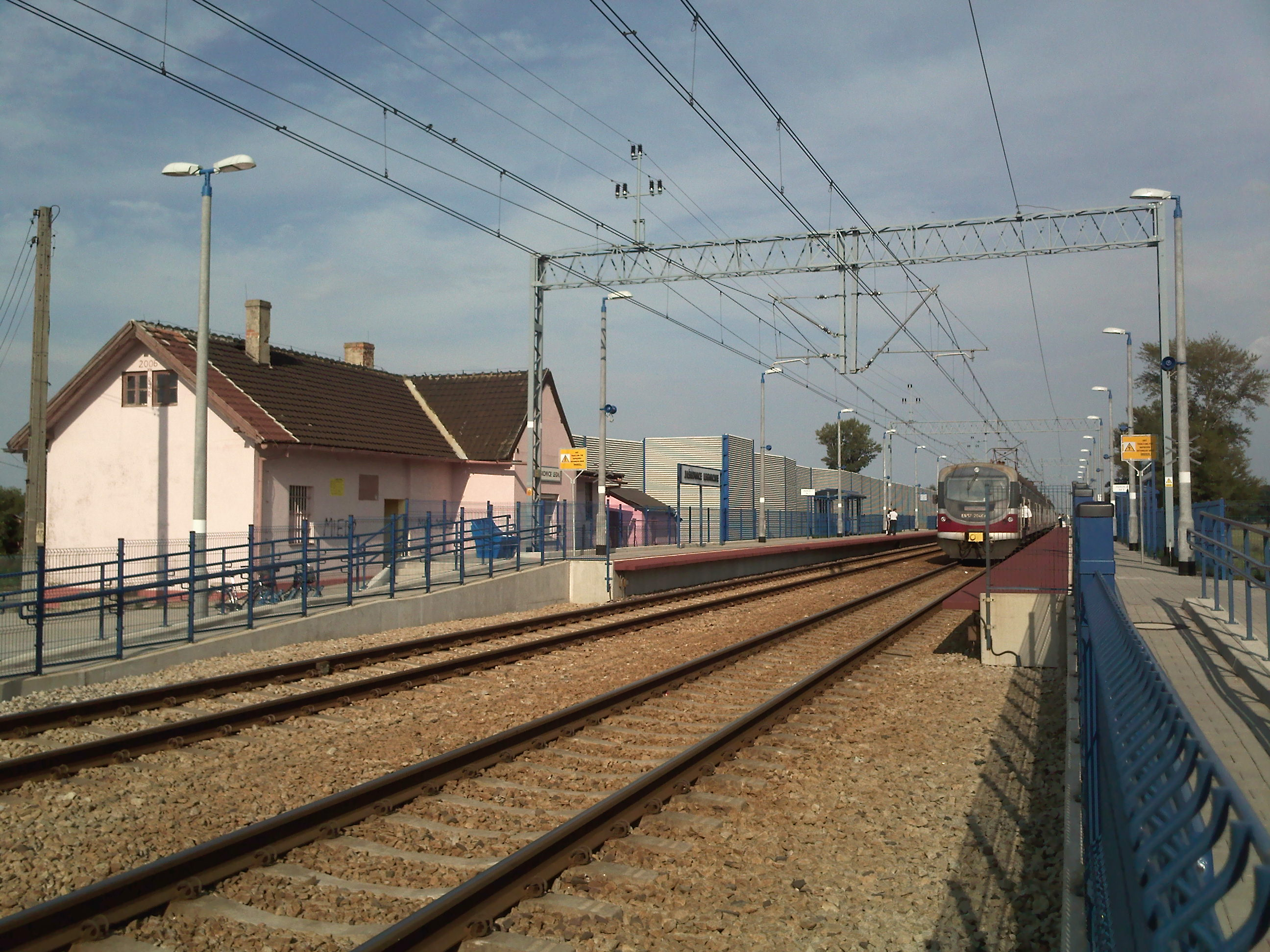
- Jaśkowice Legnickie railway station

- Location within Poland
- Coordinates: 51°13′16″N 16°18′56″E
- Country: Poland
- Voivodeship: Lower Silesian
- County: Legnica
- Gmina: Kunice
- Website: http://www.jaskowice.ro-dan.com

Jaśkowice Legnickie [jaɕkɔˈvit͡sɛ lɛɡˈnit͡skʲɛ] (German: Jeschkendorf) is a village in the administrative district of Gmina Kunice, within Legnica County, Lower Silesian Voivodeship, in south-western Poland.

The village is served by Jaśkowice Legnickie railway station.
