= Miłogostowice =

- Village
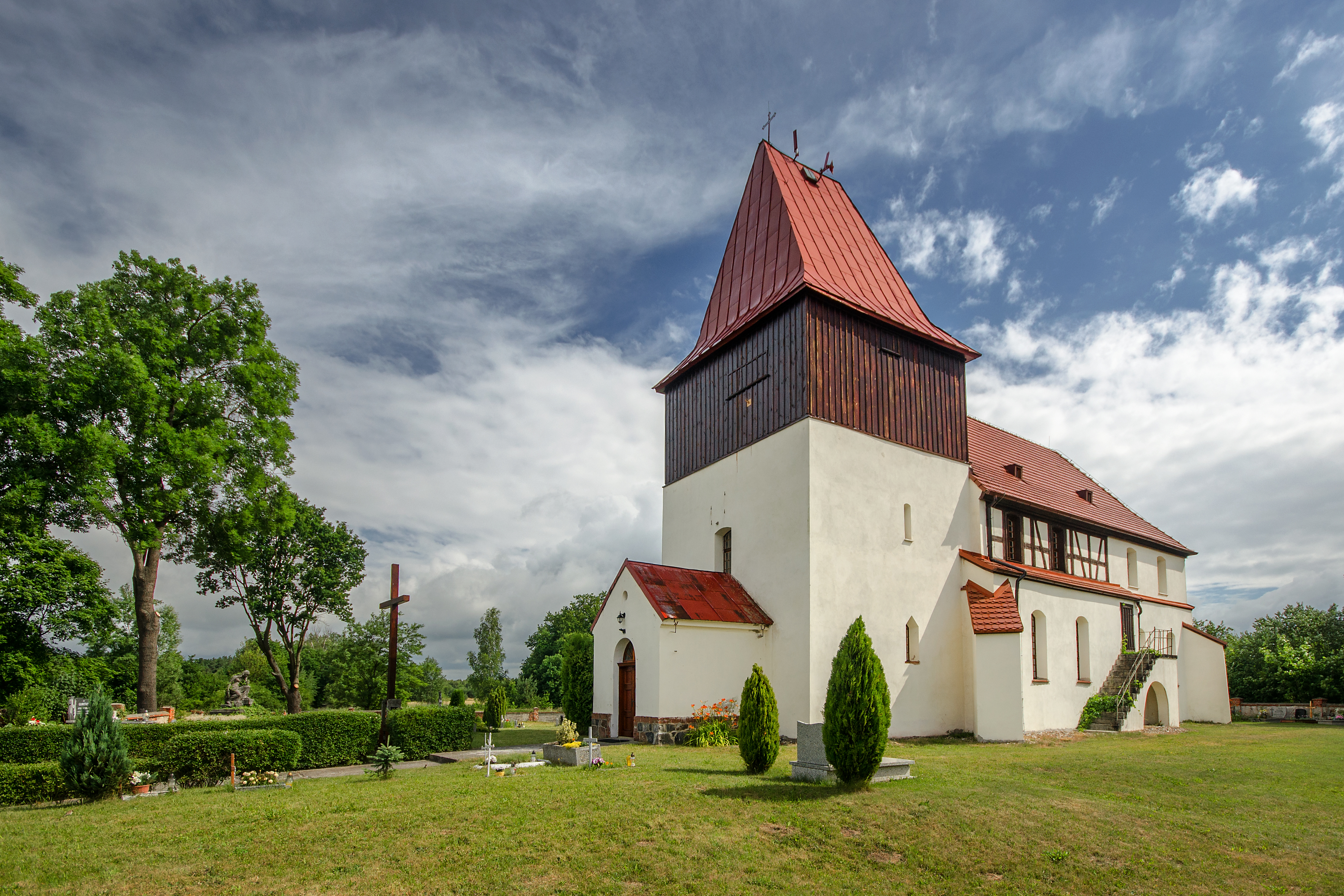
- Saint Stanislaus church in Miłogostowice

- Location within Poland
- Coordinates: 51°16′48″N 16°13′13″E
- Country: Poland
- Voivodeship: Lower Silesian
- County: Legnica
- Gmina: Kunice

Miłogostowice [miwɔɡɔstɔˈvit͡sɛ] is a village in the administrative district of Gmina Kunice, within Legnica County, Lower Silesian Voivodeship, in south-western Poland.
