= Kunice railway station =

Railway station in south-western Poland

Kunice
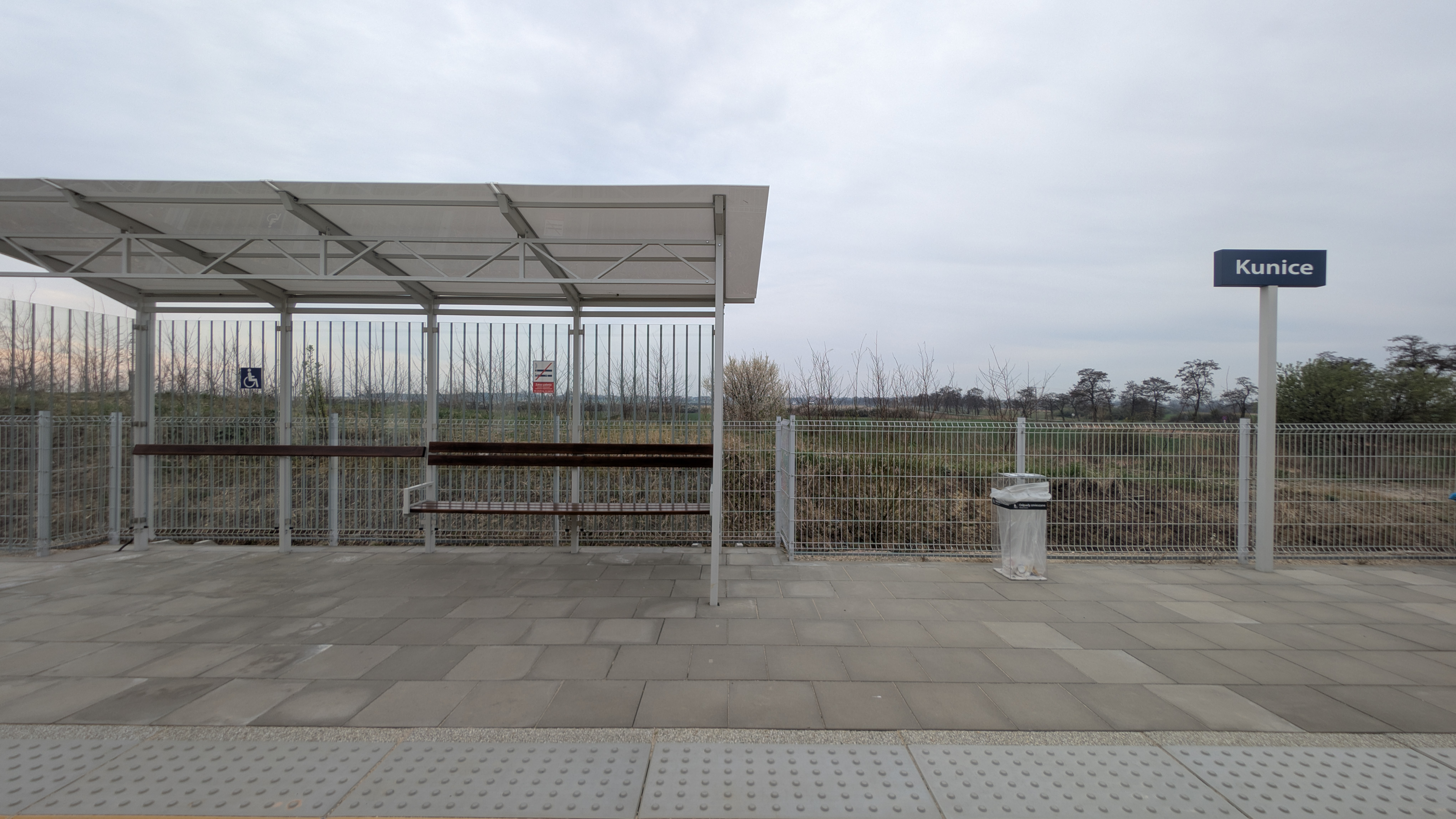
- Platform

General information
- Location: Kunice, Lower Silesian Voivodeship; Poland
- Coordinates: 51°12′54.0″N 16°15′14.0″E
- Owner: Polish State Railways
- Line: Wrocław–Gubinek railway
- Platforms: 2

History
- Opened: 15 June 2025

Services
| Preceding station | KD | Following station |
|---|---|---|
| Jaśkowice Legnickie towards Wrocław Główny | D1 | Legnica towards Lubań Śląski |
| Jaśkowice Legnickie towards Wrocław Główny | D10 | Legnica towards Dresden Hauptbahnhof |
Location
- Location within Poland Location within Lower Silesian Voivodeship

Kunice is a railway station on the Wrocław–Gubinek railway in the village of Kunice, Legnica County, within the Lower Silesian Voivodeship in south-western Poland.

== History ==
Between 1910 and 1945, a passing loop was located at the site of the current station, named Kunitz-Überholungsgleis (lit. 'Kunice passing loop'). After World War II, the passing loop was converted to a siding, which was eventually demolished.

Part of the Governmental Programme for the Construction or Modernisation of Railway Stops for 2021–2025, Kunice railway station was constructed at the site of the former passing loop at a cost of approximately 6.5 million PLN. The new station opened on 15 June 2025.

There are currently plans to build a new pavement and bicycle path between Ziemnice and Kunice, easing access to Kunice railway station.

== Train services ==
The station is served by the following services:

- Regional services (KD) Wrocław - Legnica - Węgliniec - Lubań Śląski
- Regional services (KD) Wrocław - Legnica - Zgorzelec - Görlitz
- Regional services (KD) Wrocław - Legnica - Lubin - Głogów
