= Rosochata =

- Village
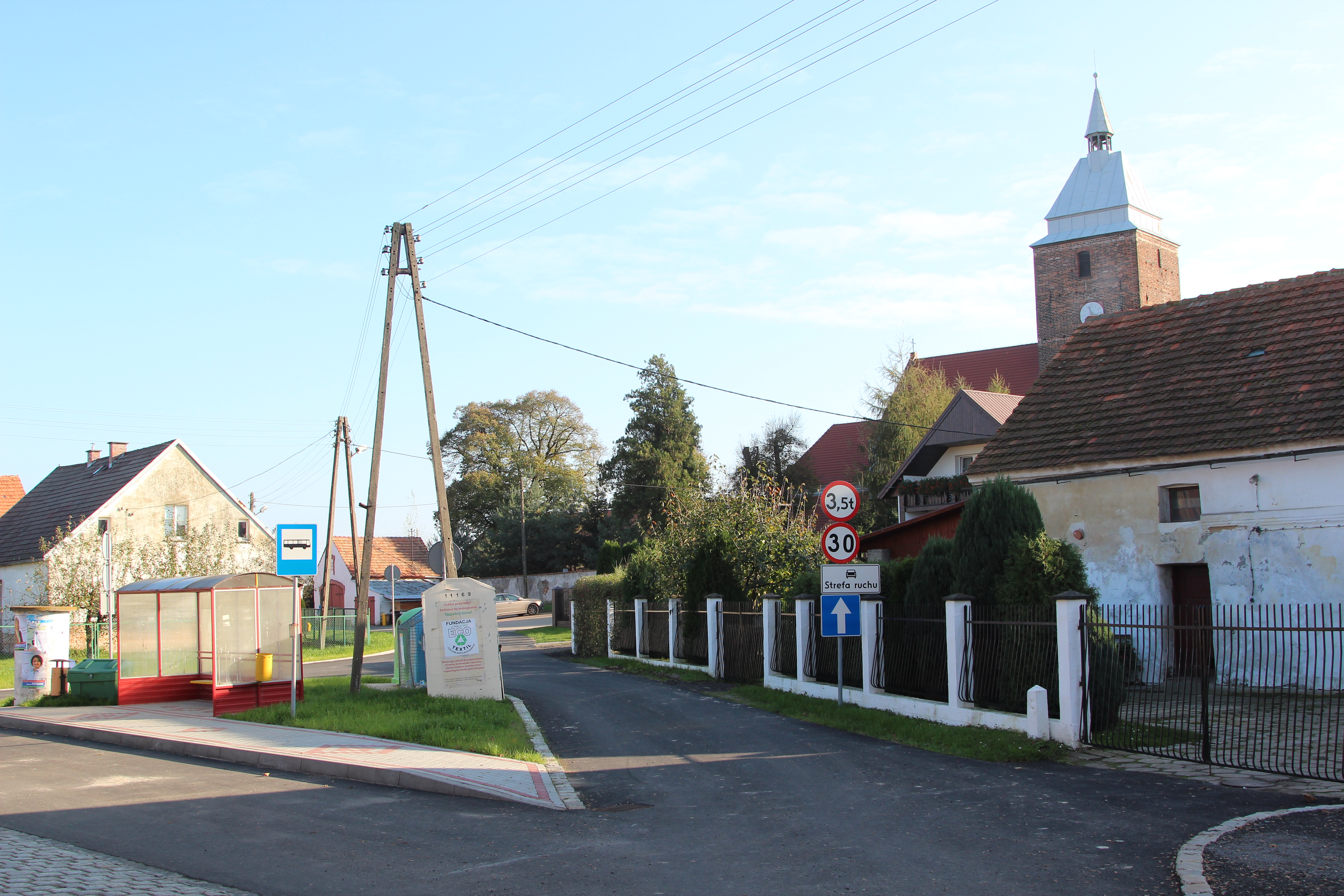

- Location within Poland
- Coordinates: 51°12′N 16°19′E
- Country: Poland
- Voivodeship: Lower Silesian
- County: Legnica
- Gmina: Kunice

Rosochata [rɔsɔˈxata] (German: Seifersdorf) is a village in the administrative district of Gmina Kunice, within Legnica County, Lower Silesian Voivodeship, in south-western Poland.
