= Szczytniki nad Kaczawą =

- Village
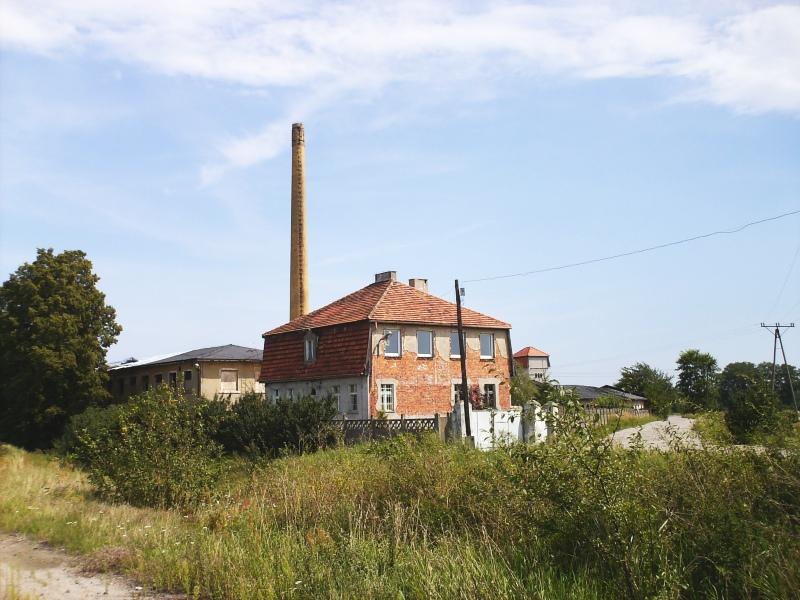

- Location within Poland
- Coordinates: 51°17′N 16°17′E
- Country: Poland
- Voivodeship: Lower Silesian
- County: Legnica
- Gmina: Kunice

Szczytniki nad Kaczawą [ʂt͡ʂɨtˈɲiki ˌnat kaˈt͡ʂavɔ̃] is a village in the administrative district of Gmina Kunice, within Legnica County, Lower Silesian Voivodeship, in south-western Poland.
