= Bieniowice =

- Village
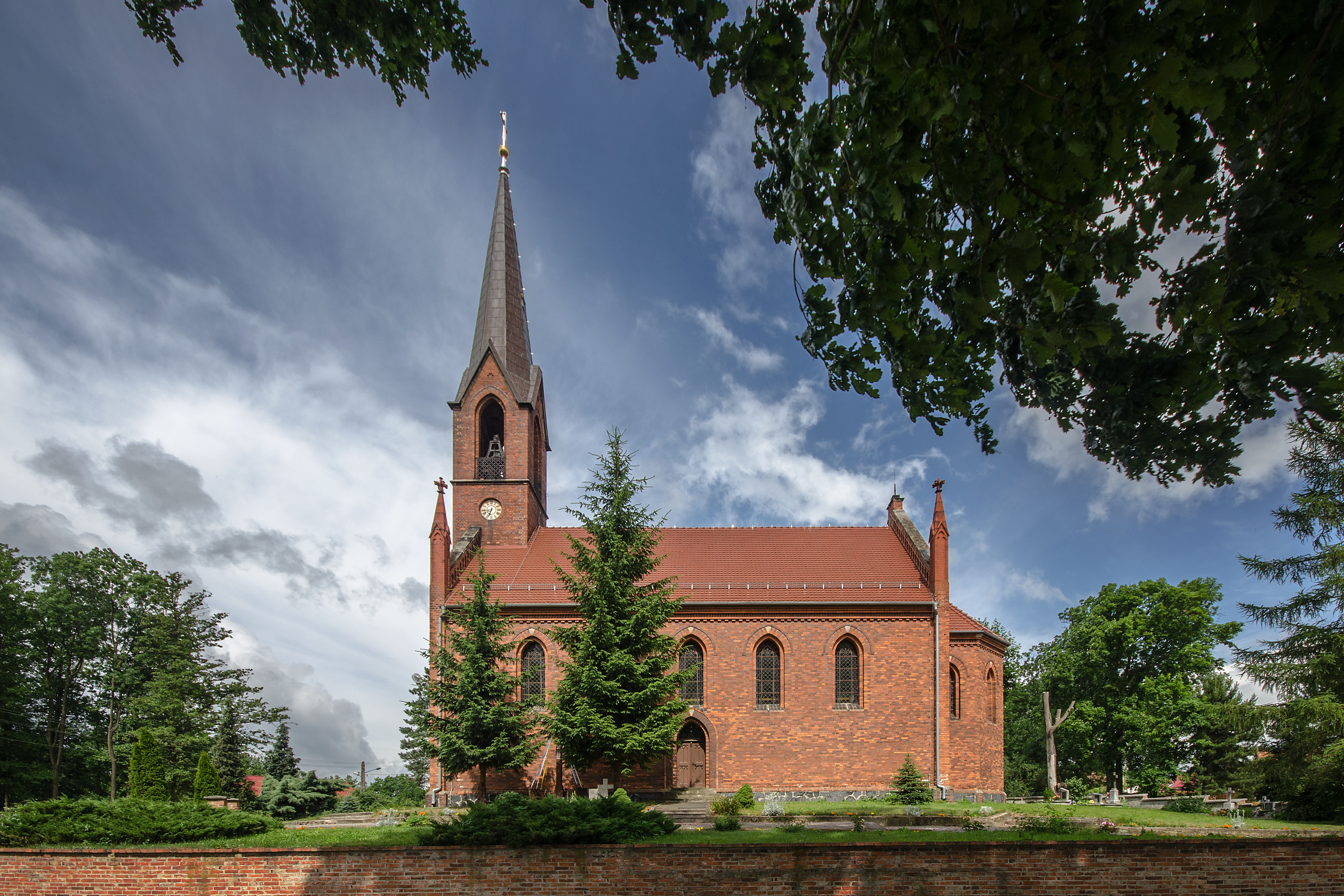
- Church of the Annunciation of the Lord

- Location within Poland
- Coordinates: 51°16′N 16°15′E
- Country: Poland
- Voivodeship: Lower Silesian
- County: Legnica
- Gmina: Kunice

Bieniowice [bjɛɲɔˈvit͡sɛ] is a village in the administrative district of Gmina Kunice, within Legnica County, Lower Silesian Voivodeship, in south-western Poland. According to a census conducted in 2011, the population of the town is 1,186.
