= Szczytniki Małe =

- Village
- Location within Poland
- Coordinates: 51°14′30″N 16°16′04″E
- Country: Poland
- Voivodeship: Lower Silesian
- County: Legnica
- Gmina: Kunice

Szczytniki Małe [ʂt͡ʂɨtˈɲiki ˈmawɛ] is a village in the administrative district of Gmina Kunice, within Legnica County, Lower Silesian Voivodeship, in south-western Poland.
