= Grzybiany =

- Village
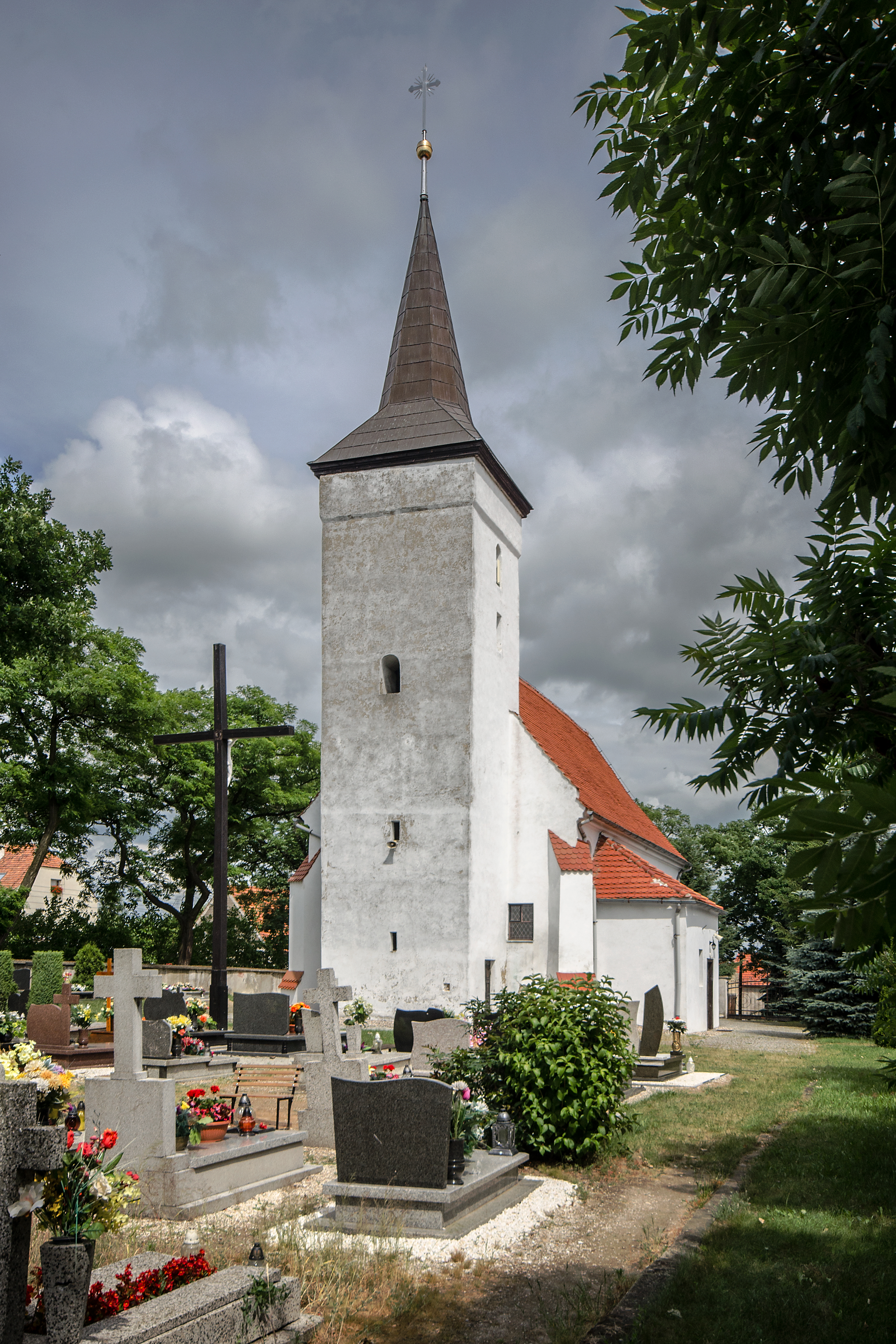
- Catholic church

- Location within Poland
- Coordinates: 51°11′41″N 16°16′32″E
- Country: Poland
- Voivodeship: Lower Silesian
- County: Legnica
- Gmina: Kunice

Grzybiany [ɡʐɨˈbjanɨ] is a village in the administrative district of Gmina Kunice, within Legnica County, Lower Silesian Voivodeship, in south-western Poland.
