= Albrecht von Thaer =

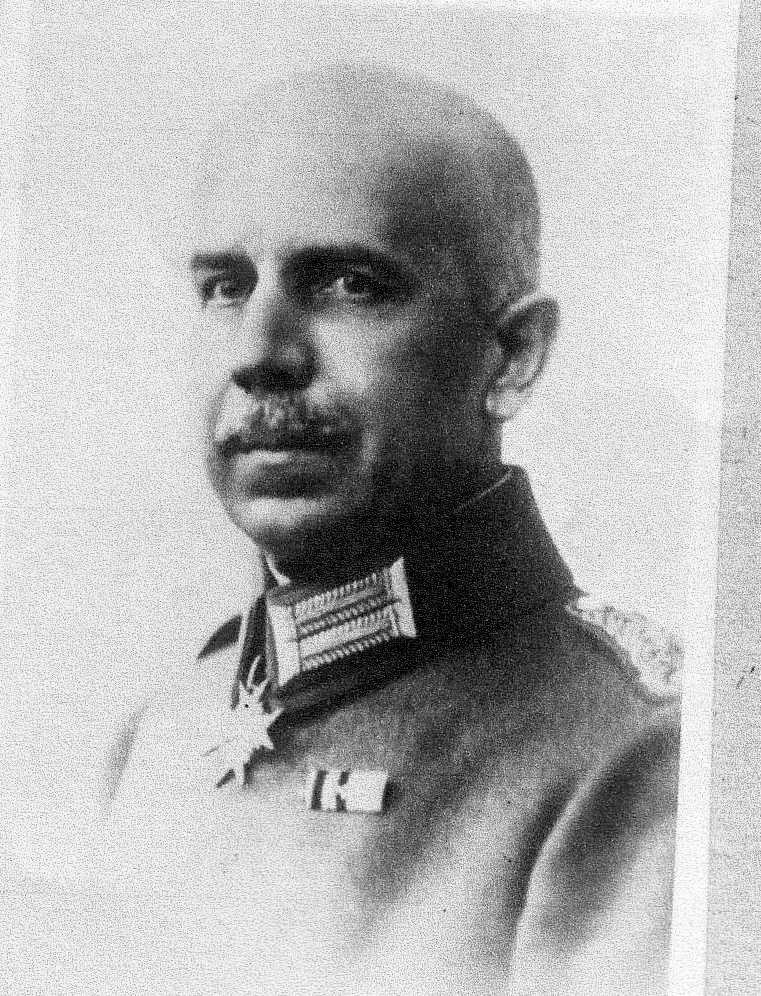
- Born: 2 June 1868; Panten, Silesia, Kingdom of Prussia
- Died: 23 June 1957 (aged 89); Gronau, West Germany
- Military career
- Allegiance: German Empire; Weimar Republic
- Branch: Imperial German Army; Reichsheer
- Service years: 1890–1922
- Rank: Oberst char. Generalmajor
- Unit: German General Staff
- Conflicts: World War I Greater Poland uprising
- Awards: Pour le Mérite
- Other work: General Representative of the former King of Saxony

Albrecht Georg Otto von Thaer (2 June 1868 – 23 June 1957) was a German General Staff Officer and representative ("Generalbevollmächtigter") of Frederick Augustus III of Saxony the last (King of Saxony). He came to prominence in connection with his participation in the controversial long-distance cavalry exercise between Berlin and Vienna in 1892 and, later, on account of his First World War diaries, when these were published posthumously.

== Life ==
=== Family provenance and early years ===
Von Thaer was born in Panten, a small town in the flat lands a short distance to the west of Breslau (as Wrocław was known at that time), the eldest of his parents' six recorded children. He grew up with his siblings on his parents' farm ("Pawonkau Manor Farm" / "Gut Pawonkau ") at Lublinitz, some distance to the east of Breslau, on the margins of Upper Silesia. His father, Georg Ernst von Thaer (1834–1898), was a land owner and horse breeder who had been ennobled for his services to agriculture and cattle breeding. His mother, also from the ranks of the nobility, had been born Franziska von Dresler und Scharfenstein (1843–1918). Her father, Otto von Dresler und Scharfenstein (1805–1880), was a senior government administrator. One of her brothers, Albrecht's maternal uncle, Hermann von Dresler und Scharfenstein, later became an infantry general who won the Pour le Mérite medal in 1917. On his father's side, Albrecht von Thaer's great-grandfather Albrecht Daniel Thaer had been a pioneering agronomist, identified by admirers as the father of modern agriculture.

Von Thaer was initially home-schooled. Later he attended the Gymnasium (secondary school) in Liegnitz. By the time he passed his Abitur (school leaving exam) in 1888, it was as a pupil at the Liegnitz Ritter-Akademie (literally: "Liegnitz Academy for Knights"). Three of his mother's four brothers were army officers, and he resolved to pursue a career as a cavalry officer. His father insisted that he should first obtain a higher-level academic qualification, however, and accordingly he embarked on a period as a law student. Army officers with an academic qualification were relatively thin on the ground at this time, but having passed his Abitur von Thaer had surmounted the principal hurdle necessary to qualify for university-level education. As a student, he became involved with the Young Men's Christian Association (YMCA) and became an active follower of the conservative Christian-Socialist theologian-politician (and royal chaplain) Adolf Stoecker.

In 1892 Albrecht von Thaer passed Part I of the State Law Exams at the Berlin state court, after seven terms (three and a half years) of study. His studies might have progressed more rapidly had he not been combining them with the cautious beginnings of his military career.

=== Military career ===
==== Beginnings ====
During 1890–1891 Thaer served a one-year term with the 1st Life Cuirassiers "Great Elector" (Silesian) Regiment, based in Breslau. Then, on 1 October 1891, he was accepted as a reserve officer. His legal studies concluded, on 16 April 1892 he joined the 7th (Magdeburg) "von Seydlitz" Cuirassiers in Halberstadt. Here, thanks to his slightly unmilitary educational trajectory, he found himself approximately four years older than colleagues of similar rank who had become army officers via the Cadet Corps route. Thaers' superior, the regimental commander at this point, was Colonel von Runstedt: higher up in the military structure, the commanding general of IV Army Corps was Cavalry General Carl von Hänisch.

==== The Berlin-Vienna Cavalry Event ====
In summer 1892, the new Kaiser announced a long distance ride, between Berlin and Vienna, for German cavalry officers. Thaer, only recently commissioned as a second lieutenant, applied to his supervising officer for permission to participate, wearing the uniform of the Von Seydelitz Cuirassiers. The distance from Berlin to Vienna meant that the exercise would be unique, and that it would place considerable demands on the men and horses involved. The responsible cavalry officer, General von Hänisch, doubted that the newly promoted lieutenant, who till recently had combined his military career with that of a part-time law student, could successfully overcome the challenges involved. Von Hänisch's concern for the reputation of his cuirassiers was shared by Major-General Willy von Haeseler, commander of the 8th Cavalry Brigade. Despite the doubts of these senior officers, in the end von Thaer was permitted to take part in the event.

Albrecht von Thaer was able to compensate for his lack of military experience with knowledge of horses. The precise destination for the exercise was the suburb of Floridsdorf, on the south side of central Vienna. The fastest German rider was First Lieutenant Lord von Reitzenstein of the 4th (Westphalian) Cuirassiers "von Driesen", riding "Lippspringe", a Senner mare. The horse died after the race. The second fastest German horse - placed ninth in the overall rankings - was ridden by Albrecht von Thaer, with a total riding time of 78 hours and 45 minutes. The prize money was 1,800 Marks. His horse, a small oriental-Polish grey mare, had attracted derision at the start of the race. He had purchased the animal at the Kraków horse market in 1890. She reached the finishing point undamaged apart from signs of "saddle pressure" (as a result of which she fell out of contention for the "condition prize").

After the event, Thaer became a squadron leader with the heavy cavalry of the Cuirassier Regiment "Queen" (Pomeranian) No. 2 (a traditional unit from the former Dragoner-Regiment Nr.5 Ansbach-Bayreuth dragoons), based in Pasewalk (to the west of Stetin). Then from 1 October 1910, he was ordered to Berlin by the General Staff. He was assigned to the French division which was under the command of Hermann von Kuhl (who shortly thereafter was promoted to Generalmajor). Thaer was made a cavalry officer responsible for matters involving the French cavalry. In 1910 he was promoted to major.

==== Helmuth von Moltke ====
During his time in Berlin, Thaer had an encounter with Helmuth von Moltke the Younger, the head of the German General Staff, who was of course several ranks senior to Thaer. The incident sheds light on the social nuances of honour and military etiquette that were a feature of the imperial Prussian officer corps at the time. In 1910, von Thaer returned from an absence of several months during which he had been on holiday in Russia and reported back to the head of the chief of staff, General von Moltke. Von Moltke invited his candid opinion on the state of relations between Germany and Russia. It seems likely that von Moltke misunderstood his junior officer's reply. He understood von Thaer to have advocated a Preventive war against Russia. There was much concern in Germany at this time that the military power balance with Russia was shifting in Russia's favour, and there were many who thought that since military confrontation was inevitable, the outcome would be more likely to favour the German Empire if war came sooner rather than later. Von Moltke was firmly opposed to the "preventive war" idea, however. Thaer, in his report of his conversation with von Moltke, insists that he too was similarly opposed to any "preventive war" proposals. But that seems not to have been what von Moltke thought he had heard. In any case, von Molkte concluded the interview frostily with the formal phrase, "Ich danke Ihnen, Herr Hauptmann" ("I thank you, Mr Officer"). Thaer saw this choice of words as an insult. The customary formulation at the time (even if strictly speaking "incorrect") would have been "Ich danke Ihnen, Thaer", using the name of a brother officer despite the difference in their actual ranks. Thaer waited for 24 hours and then submitted a complaint. Von Moltke apologised and clarified the matter to him. There is no obvious evidence that Thaer's subsequent military career was damaged by the incident.

==== Further staff appointments ====
His next appointment took effect on 15 September 1911 when he was transferred to the General Staff of the 36th Division, a border division stationed in Danzig, and at that time under the command of General Lieutenant Kuno von Steuben. The division included the First Life Hussars Regiments and the Second "Queen Victoria of Prussia" Life Hussars Regiments. At the same time that Thaer took up his Danzig posting, the young Crown Prince William was sent to Danzig-Langfuhr to take command of the First Light Hussars Regiments.

At the end of February 1913, he was transferred again, this time to the Guards Corps back in Berlin, as First General Staff Officer. The commander general at this stage was still 65 year old Infantry General and General Adjutant Alfred von Loewenfeld, who shortly thereafter, on 1 March 1913, made way for Infantry General and General Adjutant Karl von Plettenberg.

==== First World War and after ====
In August 1914, the Guards Corps moved up to the Western Front. On 11 November 1914, they took part in a concentrated attack on Ypres. Thaer was appointed Deputy Chief of Staff under von Plettenberg along the road linking Menen with Geluwe and Geluveld.

In January 1915, he was appointed Chief of the General Staff with the IX Reserve Corps which was deployed in trench warfare on French soil and was later involved in the battles of 1916–1918. That meant participation in the 1916 Battle of the Somme, at Arras and in the 3rd Battle of Ypres (Third Flanders Offensive) in 1917 and in Operation Georgette outside Armentières during the early part of 1918. After facing intensive British attacks, on 6 August 1917, Lieutenant Colonel Thaer was awarded the Pour le Mérite in recognition of his conduct as Corps Leader. Despite committing to paper his belief that the honour belonged more properly to his men, he wrote excitedly to his wife of the celebration planned with fellow officers on the evening of the award.

On 24 April 1918, Thaer was transferred to work at Oberste Heeresleitung (Supreme Army Command) as Chief of Staff for the Quartermaster general (II). The post had been created to support General Erich Ludendorff, who since September 1916 had been running the German army (and in some respects running the war effort) jointly with Field Marshal Paul von Hindenburg.

At the start of 1919, he was transferred to the eastern frontier, stationed at Schneidemühl (since 1945, in Poland). Bitter fighting against Poles took place for several weeks and in the middle of February 1919, Thaer's troops withdrew behind the new Polish Corridor in accordance with the provisions of the Treaty of Versailles.

On 7 September 1919, Thaer became chief of staff of the Northern Command, an Army group headquartered initially in Bartenstein and later in Kolberg (at which point it was renamed Command Group 3). In the context of the reduction of the army to just 20,000 men - soon afterwards raised by the victorious powers to a limit of 100,000 - on 10 March 1920, Thaer was given the task of creating the Seventh (Prussian) Mounted Regiment (previously the Sixth Mounted Regiment) in Breslau (as Wrocław was then known). This unit comprised mainly members formerly of the Life Cuirassiers' regiments; Thaer had command of this regiment until 31 December 1921.

By this time he was encountering increasingly stark differences with General Hans von Seeckt who had become head of the army in 1920. Thaer submitted his resignation and entered military requirement, taking at his own wish the uniform of a Colonel of the old Prussian General Staff; he was 53. Nearly two decades later, on 27 August 1939, he was given the title of Generalmajor in the context of nationwide celebrations intended to highlight the Battle of Tannenberg a quarter of a century earlier.

=== After the army ===
When he resigned from the army in 1922, Thaer was 54. He was appointed General Director and Legal Representative for the Silesian territories of the abdicated King of Saxony, Frederick Augustus III. On his abdication in 1918, the former king had relocated to his castle at Sibyllenort near Oels, where he had the use of a country estate of agricultural land and forest amounting to around 20,000 hectares. Thaer moved in 1922 to a service apartment in nearby Domatschine. His duties came to an end in 1934, some two years after the death of Frederick Augustus. One of Thaer's last official duties was to organise the former king's funeral which took place in Dresden on 23 February 1932. By the time the ex-king died, he and Thaer had become friends.

Thaer now managed the "Süßwinkel" manor farm, which occupied approximately 1,000 hectares near Oels. The property had been purchased from the king's estate by the geologist Hans Merensky in 1934. The Merenskys were family friends: those of the von Thaer children closest in age to the Marensky siblings had spent childhood years together on the Pawonkau manor farm, while Alexander Merensky was away in South Africa working as a missionary doctor. In 1938, Hans Merensky gifted the Süßwinkel property to Albrecht von Thaer and his elder brother, Georg "Süßwinkel". It may be of relevance that Merensky had worked in South Africa during the 1920s. In 1924 he had discovered what has come to be called the Merensky Reef, an area of rock containing most of the world's known platinum deposits. This meant that, following a period of destitution, Hans Merensky was, by the 1930s, inordinately wealthy.

Early in 1945, as another world war neared its end, the approach of the Soviet armies forced Albrecht von Thaer to flee to the west. He settled in Gronau, a short distance to the south of Hannover, and this is where, in summer 1957, he died. His wife had previously died in 1941.

== Family ==
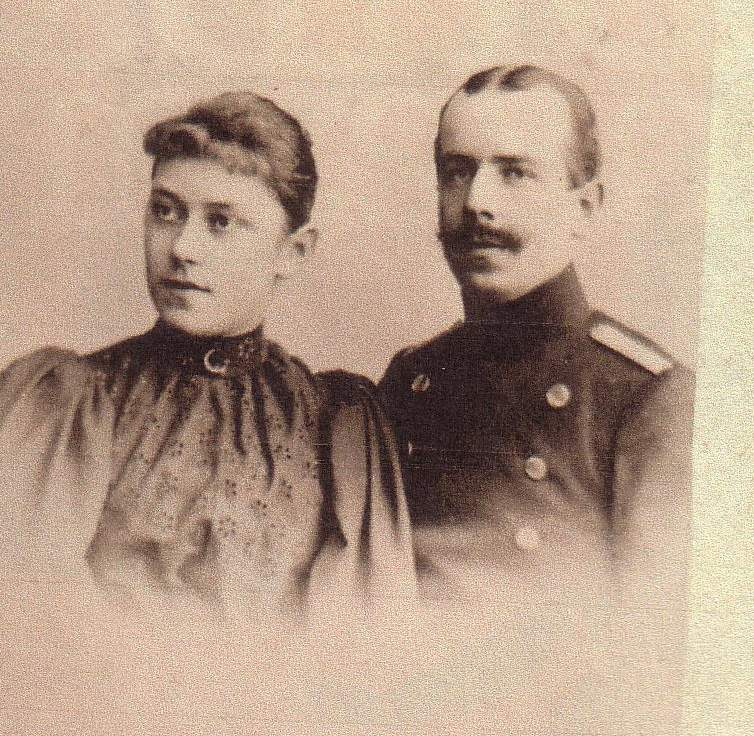
Albrecht and Elisabeth in 1894

In 1895, Albrecht von Thaer married Elisabeth Walther-Weisbeck (1876–1941) in Wegeleben, where Elisabeth's father, August Walther-Weisbeck (1845–1925) served as a royal magistrate and ran a manor farm. The marriage resulted in one recorded son and three recorded daughters:

- Albrecht Ernst von Thaer (1900-1946) became a civil lawyer and reserve officer. In 1934 he married Annemarie von Lucke (1913-?), the daughter of another aristocratic landowner. He died of gun-shot wounds and the ensuing absence of treatment while being held as a Russian prisoner of war.
- Ursula von Thaer died in childhood.
- Brunhilde von Thaer (1901-1994) never married.
- Gisela von Thaer (1904-1999) married Bogislav, Count of Pfeil and Klein-Ellguth (1895–1977) from Wildschütz Oels). One of their daughters married Eckard von Scherenberg (1934-2008) in 1960.

== War diaries: Critique of the conduct of the war ==
In 1958, the historian Siegfried A. Kaehler published a book entitled "Generalstabsdienst an der Front und in der O.H.L." ("General Staff Service on the frontline and in the Army High Command"). The book consisted of extracts from Thaer's diaries and from his letters (mostly addressed to his wife) written during the First World War, to which Kaehler added his own commentary. Kaehler had the greatest difficulty in persuading Thaer to allow the publication of his diaries and letters: in the end he agreed to publication provided it should take place only after his death (his wife predeceased him by sixteen years). Thaer's position at the heart of power in the German army during the final part of the war, and his open-minded attitude bordering, sometimes, on criticism regarding the decisions of the army leadership mean that his records are excellent sources for historians re-evaluating the First World War. There have been critics who pointed out that the need for secrecy meant that even in his diaries he could not record the actual proceedings of the General Staff meetings. But taken in combination with the known attitudes and judgements expressed by the principal protagonists, Ludendorff, Hindenburg and the Kaiser during the end phase of the already lost war, they provide evidence for motivations and imputed culpabilities, and they offer valuable insights into the origins of the destructively toxic Stab-in-the-back myth—the Dolchstoß legend.

=== ... on the first tanks ===
On 15 September 1916, in the fighting around Combles, Flers and Courcelette during the Battle of the Somme, the entente armies used tanks for the first time. The deployment came as part of an attack by Fourth Army army corps II, XIV and XV under General Rawlinson against positions held by the 1st Army under General Fritz von Below. Relatively few of the 49 tanks that had originally been earmarked for the operation took part, and they made little difference in the fighting. But these Mark I British tanks would be progressively tested and improved as the war continued, and little by little their military significance would increase. Ludendorff greatly underestimated this new weapon, to such an extent that he allowed tank production in Germany to be throttled. Thaer was one of the first senior German officers to appreciate the potential danger that enemy tanks represented. As early as 30 January 1917, he notes "This question of the tanks continues to preoccupy me ... They are probably underestimated by the [German] high command".

The British tanks returned during the first part of 1917, this time as part of the Battle of Arras. Most directly affected on the German side was the IX Reserve Corps, in which at this point Thaer was serving as Chief of Staff. Although, to the extent that they failed to achieve their military objectives, the Battle of Arras was seen as a defeat for the British, Thaer's diaries show that he was confirmed in his critical view of German military leadership: "Faced with the tanks, our infantry reacted with terror, and indeed they were right since they were defenceless. Infantry weapons made no impression. Now a weapon is on its way that should cut through, but sadly the folks at high command seem incomprehensibly to underestimate the danger from the tanks".

As the war dragged on, better tanks were deployed. In 1918, for the first time, a large number of faster French Renault tanks appeared on the battlefield. "For the artillery, an encounter with such beasts is almost as unequal as shooting deer with rifle shot", wrote Thaer.

=== ... on frontline experience ===
Between 1915 and early 1918, Thaer was with the IX Reserve Corps which placed him directly on the frontline. He experienced the increasing psychological and physical exhaustion of troops involved in trench warfare. In a letter to his wife, dated 7 August 1917, he described the previous few days which had led, despite ferocuous fighting, to significant loss of land, and which had left the corps, after fourteen days of unbroken military engagement, at the end of its powers. At least half of the infantrymen had been lost, and those that remained were barely human. Energetic officers had been broken.

The motivation of the German soldiers tumbled. "Now there is disappointment, and it is huge", Thaer wrote in April 1918, "This is why even assaults, even when well-prepared with artillery attacks, fizzled out as soon as our infantry reached the heavily pummeled zone". Until the German army's failed spring offensive, the German army was not as badly affected by "flight from the flag" (desertion) as the entente armies, however. Initially, during the 1918 spring offensive, German troop motivation and morale surged, only crumbling again after the offensive failed. Thaer commented in his diary, "personally I had to force myself to the conviction that the troops now operated under a crushing burden of disappointment. The attacking spirit of 21 March and the days that followed which I experienced to the south of Arras 4-6 weeks ago was no longer there. ... It is clear to every company commander and every battery commander, and indeed to every musketeer and gunner, that hope has been shattered ... For the weaker characters, there are already bad consequences: general overload (Allgemeine Drückebergerei) ...".

Thaer recalled a visit that the Kaiser made to the frontline: "His majesty was finely attired, conducted himself most graciously, and spoke mostly about world affairs. It is better not to write down what he had to say about the war. His excellency von Boehn (the commanding general) turned deathly pale. [It is not clear] whether His Majesty has the faintest idea about the significance of this war [for Germany and] for him more directly, for his sceptre and crown, and indeed for the Hohenzollern dynasty."

=== ... on the final months of the war at Supreme Army Command ===
Transferred to Supreme Army Command as Chief of Staff to the Quartermaster General at the end of April 1918, Thaer reported to Hindenburg and Ludendorff on 1 May 1918. He had already resolved that he would report openly on the frontline situation to the two men running the war. By that criterion he failed. The field-marshall hero of Tannenberg was sympathetic: "My dear Mr von Thaer, your nerves have certainly been affected by the last few terrible weeks through which you have come. I think that the good spirits at Supreme Army Command will soon set you right". Thaer encountered a similar, if less avuncular, reaction a little later when he reported to First Quartermaster General Erich Ludendorff: "What's your game? What do you want me to do? Should I now make peace at any price?" Thaer replied: "Excellence, I said nothing about that. It is my duty - and it is a very painful duty - to point out that the condition of our troops is not going to improve, but will continue slowly to deteriorate". Ludendorff persisted: "If the condition of our troops is getting worse, if discipline is deteriorating, then that is your fault and the fault of all those field commanders who do not get it. How else can it be that entire divisions can found too drunk to fight, unable to implement the necessary advances. That is the explanation for the great March offensive, and now Operation Georgette, not progressing further.

In the months that followed, even as he continued to admire Ludendorff's qualities as a military leader, it is apparent that Thaer was increasingly conscious of Ludendorff'a failure to recognise military reality. But at a certain point Ludendorff also became aware that the war was lost. After Ludendorff presented explanations to the General Staff officers, the meanings of which can be inferred beyond doubt from Thaer's report of them, it became Thaer's job to spell out the situation back to Ludendorff. Thaer asked Ludendorff if he would now deliver the armistice proposal to the enemy leadership. Ludendorff's reply: "No, certainly not."

=== ... on the origins of the Dolchstoß legend ===
Disagreement persists over who originated the metaphor of a "stab in the back" as an explanation for losing the First World War. What emerges clearly from Thaer's observations is that the idea of off-loading responsibility for military defeat away from the military leadership originated in the Supreme Army Command. Even though Hindenburg and Ludendorff tried to shift the blame for the threatened defeat - and therefore the failure of their own predictions to come true - during the later years of the war, away from the army, there was not at this point any talk of a planned or treacherous conspiracy. But there was talk of the forces having been let down by shortcomings on the homefront, whereby inadequate soldiers and insufficient war resources had been supplied by the civilian authorities. Thaer quotes Ludendorff on 1 October 1918: "Right now we have no chancellor. Whoever gets appointed, there are things that need to be done. But I have asked His Majesty to bring into government those whom we have to thank that we have come to the present position. We will now see these gentlemen taking over the ministries. They must now conclude the peace that must be concluded. Let them now take the gruel that they have been delivering to us!" This argument can really only be interpreted as a form of retreat-ideology, and in that sense the first phase in the development of the Dolchstoß legend. It served to obscure the failures of the military leadership, and from there of certain specific individuals.

It was only later that this protective assertion developed into a legend - again, backed by Ludendorff - driven, primarily, by domestic political motives, which purported to blame the revolutionary activists who came to the fore in November 1918 and, more generally, democratic politicians for Germany's military defeat. That was also foreshadowed in Ludendorff's assertions on 1 October 1918: "Sadly our own army is already infected by the poison of spartakist-socialist ideas. The troops can no longer be relied upon .... you could not operate with military divisions that could not be relied upon".

The assertion that the German army had in reality been victorious, or at least undefeated ("im Felde unbesiegt") when it was stabbed in October/November 1918, and the associated narrative of the so-called "November criminals" became a heavy political mortgage for what came to be called, after 1933, the Weimar republic, first by its detractors and later more generally. As the 1920s progressed, the Dolchstoß legend, allied war guilt and the involvement of Jewish forces were crafted into a persuasive cocktail which meant that by the time the Second World War entered its end phase in 1944/45, the German officer corps for the most part avoided taking any measures which might be seen as hostile to the Nazi régime. The Dolchstoß legend also served as justification for the government's 1938 War Crimes Ordinance.
