= Gmina Kunice =

Gmina Kunice Kunice Commune
- Gmina
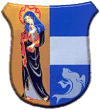
- Coat of arms
- Interactive map of Gmina Kunice
- Coordinates (Kunice): 51°13′27″N 16°14′52″E
- Country: Poland
- Voivodeship: Lower Silesian
- County: Legnica County
- Seat: Kunice
- Sołectwos: Bieniowice, Golanka Górna, Grzybiany, Jaśkowice Legnickie, Kunice, Miłogostowice, Pątnów Legnicki, Piotrówek, Rosochata, Spalona, Szczytniki Małe, Szczytniki nad Kaczawą, Ziemnice

Area
  - Total: 92.79 km^{2} (35.83 sq mi)

Population (2019-06-30)
  - Total: 6,960
  - Density: 75.0/km^{2} (194/sq mi)
- Website: https://www.kunice.pl

Gmina Kunice (German: Kreis Kunitz) is a rural gmina (administrative district) in Legnica County, Lower Silesian Voivodeship, in south-western Poland. Its seat is the village of Kunice, which lies approximately 6 kilometres (4 mi) east of Legnica and 57 km (35 mi) west of the regional capital Wrocław.

The gmina covers an area of 92.79 square kilometres (35.8 sq mi), and as of 2019 its total population is 6,960.

== Neighbouring gminas ==
Gmina Kunice is bordered by the town of Legnica and the gminas of Legnickie Pole, Lubin, Miłkowice, Prochowice and Ruja.

== Villages ==
The gmina contains the villages of Bieniowice, Golanka Górna, Grzybiany, Jaśkowice Legnickie, Kunice, Miłogostowice, Pątnów Legnicki, Piotrówek, Rosochata, Spalona, Szczytniki Małe, Szczytniki nad Kaczawą and Ziemnice.

== Twin towns – sister cities ==
Gmina Kunice is twinned with:

- Brühl, Germany
