= Pątnów Legnicki =

- Village
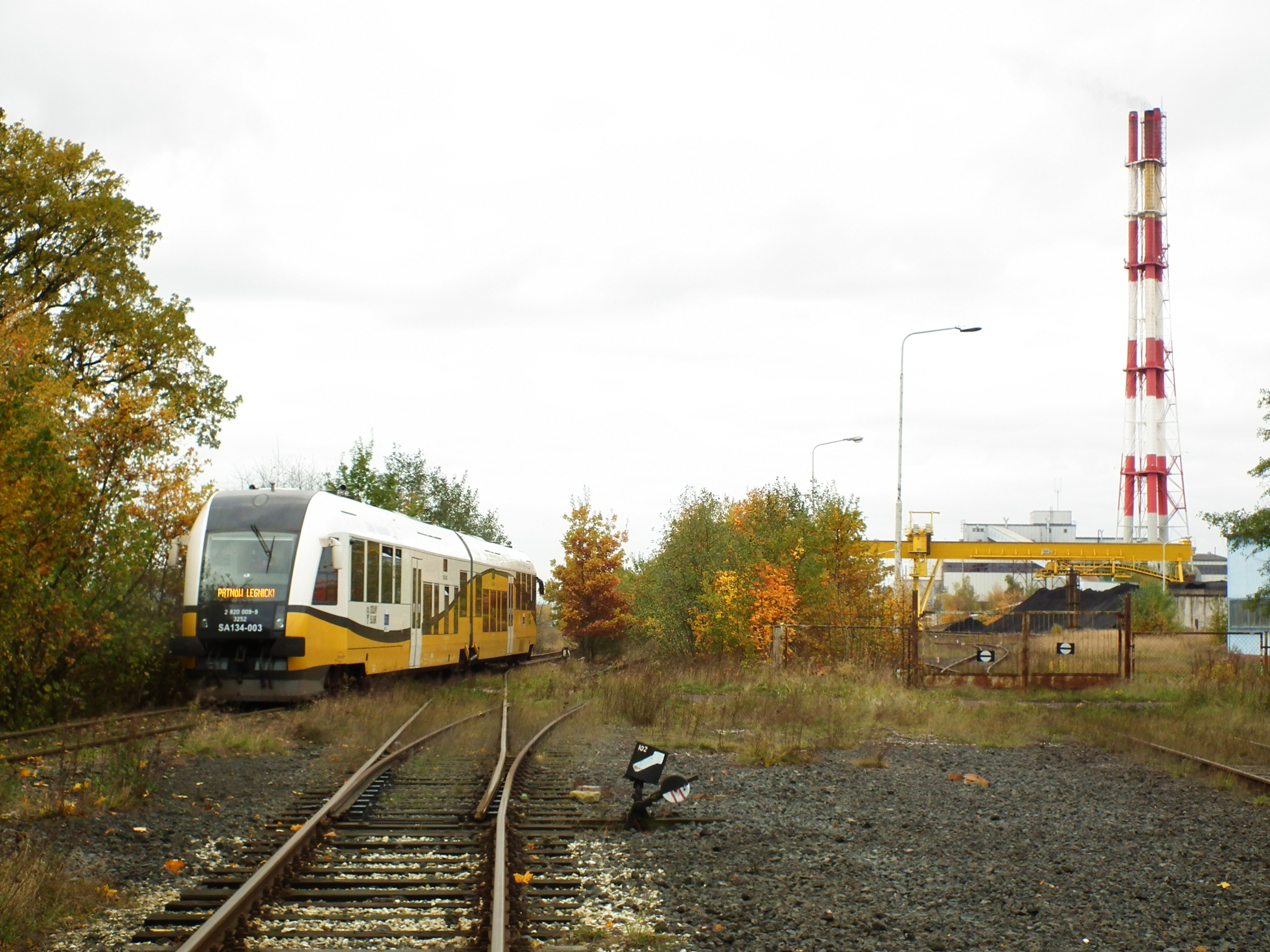

- Location within Poland
- Coordinates: 51°14′41″N 16°13′19″E
- Country: Poland
- Voivodeship: Lower Silesian
- County: Legnica
- Gmina: Kunice
- Time zone: UTC+1 (CET)
  - Summer (DST): UTC+2 (CEST)
- Vehicle registration: DLE

Pątnów Legnicki [ˈpɔntnuf lɛɡˈnit͡ski] is a village in the administrative district of Gmina Kunice in Legnica County, Lower Silesian Voivodeship, in southwestern Poland.
