= Jaśkowice Legnickie railway station =

Railway station in south-western Poland

Jaśkowice Legnickie
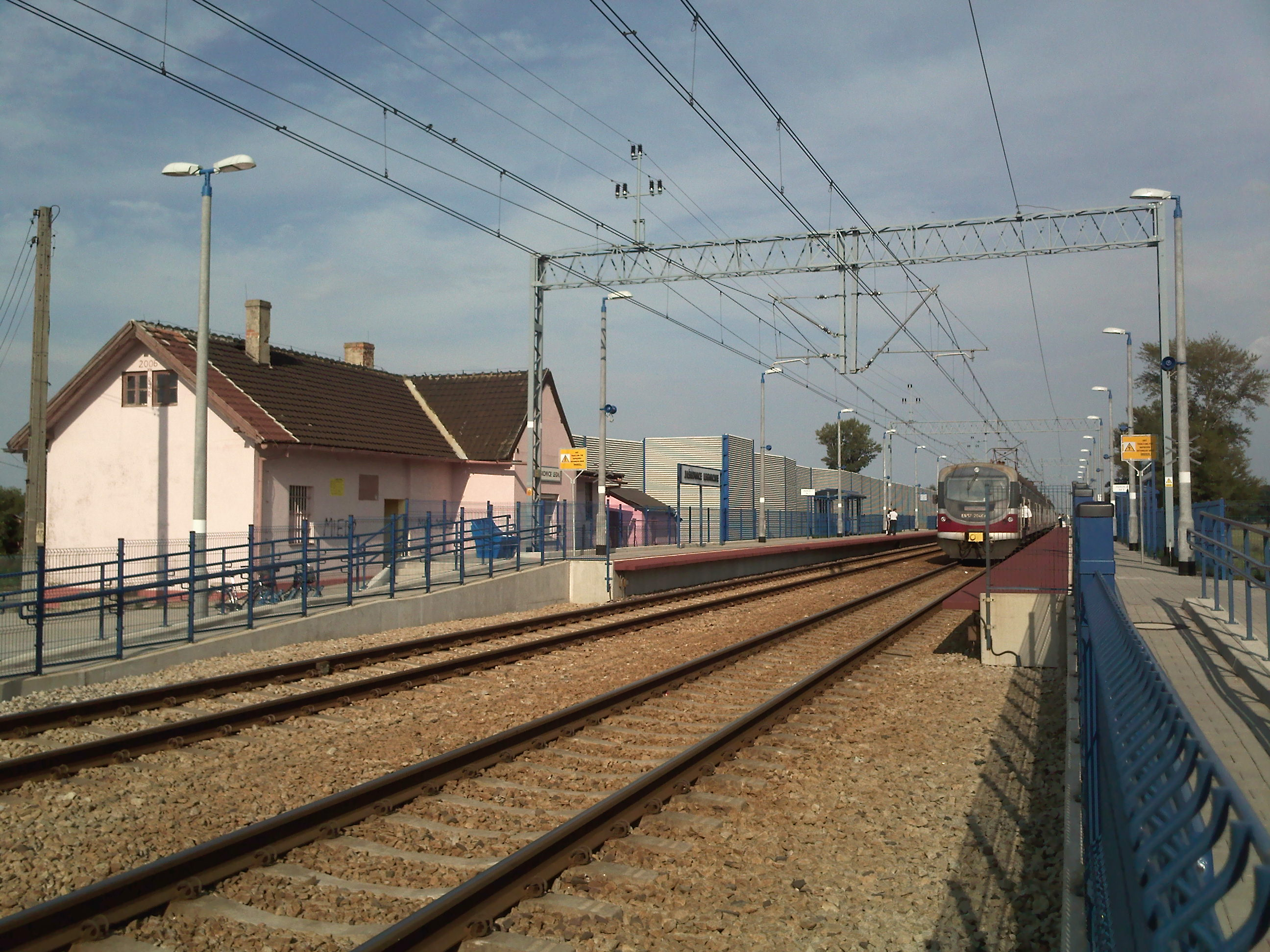
- Platforms and station building

General information
- Location: Jaśkowice Legnickie, Lower Silesian Voivodeship; Poland
- Coordinates: 51°12′54.0″N 16°18′46.1″E
- Owner: Polish State Railways
- Line: Wrocław–Gubinek railway
- Platforms: 2

History
- Opened: 19 October 1844

Services
Preceding station	KD	Following station
Szczedrzykowice towards Wrocław Główny	D1	Kunice towards Lubań Śląski
Szczedrzykowice towards Wrocław Główny	D10	Kunice towards Dresden Hauptbahnhof
Location
- Location within Poland Location within Lower Silesian Voivodeship

Jaśkowice Legnickie is a railway station on the Wrocław–Gubinek railway in the village of Jaśkowice Legnickie, Legnica County, within the Lower Silesian Voivodeship in south-western Poland.

== History ==
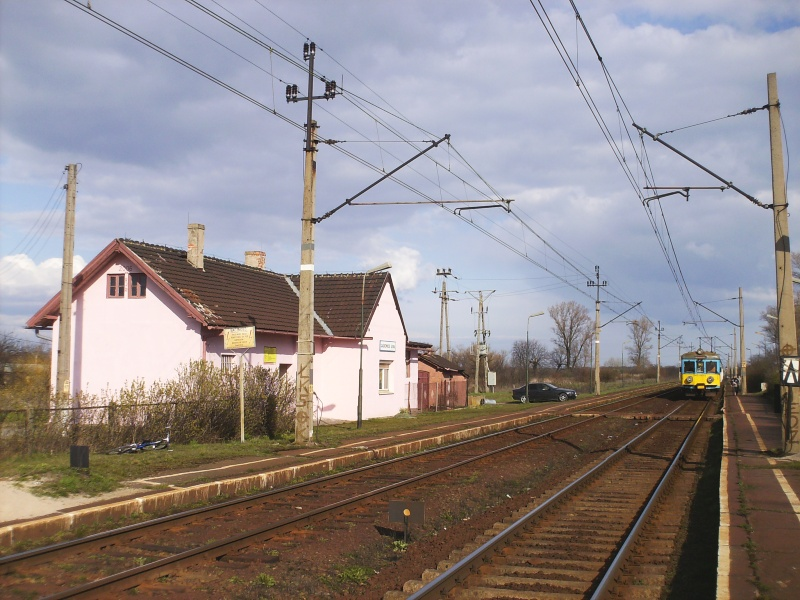
Platforms in 2008, prior to the modernisations

The station opened on 19 October 1844 as Jeschkendorf. After World War II, the area came under Polish administration. As a result, the station was taken over by Polish State Railways. The station was renamed to Jaśkowice koło Legnicy and later to its modern name, Jaśkowice Legnickie in 1947.

Part of the E30 main line modernisations, the station was modernised between 2009 and 2010. Sidings once branched off the station prior to the modernisations.

== Train services ==
The station is served by the following services:

- Regional services (KD) Wrocław - Legnica - Węgliniec - Lubań Śląski
- Regional services (KD) Wrocław - Legnica - Zgorzelec - Görlitz
