= Piotrówek, Legnica County =

Piotrówek
- Village
- Location within Poland
- Coordinates: 51°11′50″N 16°20′42″E
- Country: Poland
- Voivodeship: Lower Silesian
- County: Legnica
- Gmina: Kunice

Piotrówek [pjɔˈtruvɛk] is a village in the administrative district of Gmina Kunice, within Legnica County, Lower Silesian Voivodeship, in south-western Poland.
