= Spalona, Legnica County =

Spalona
- Village
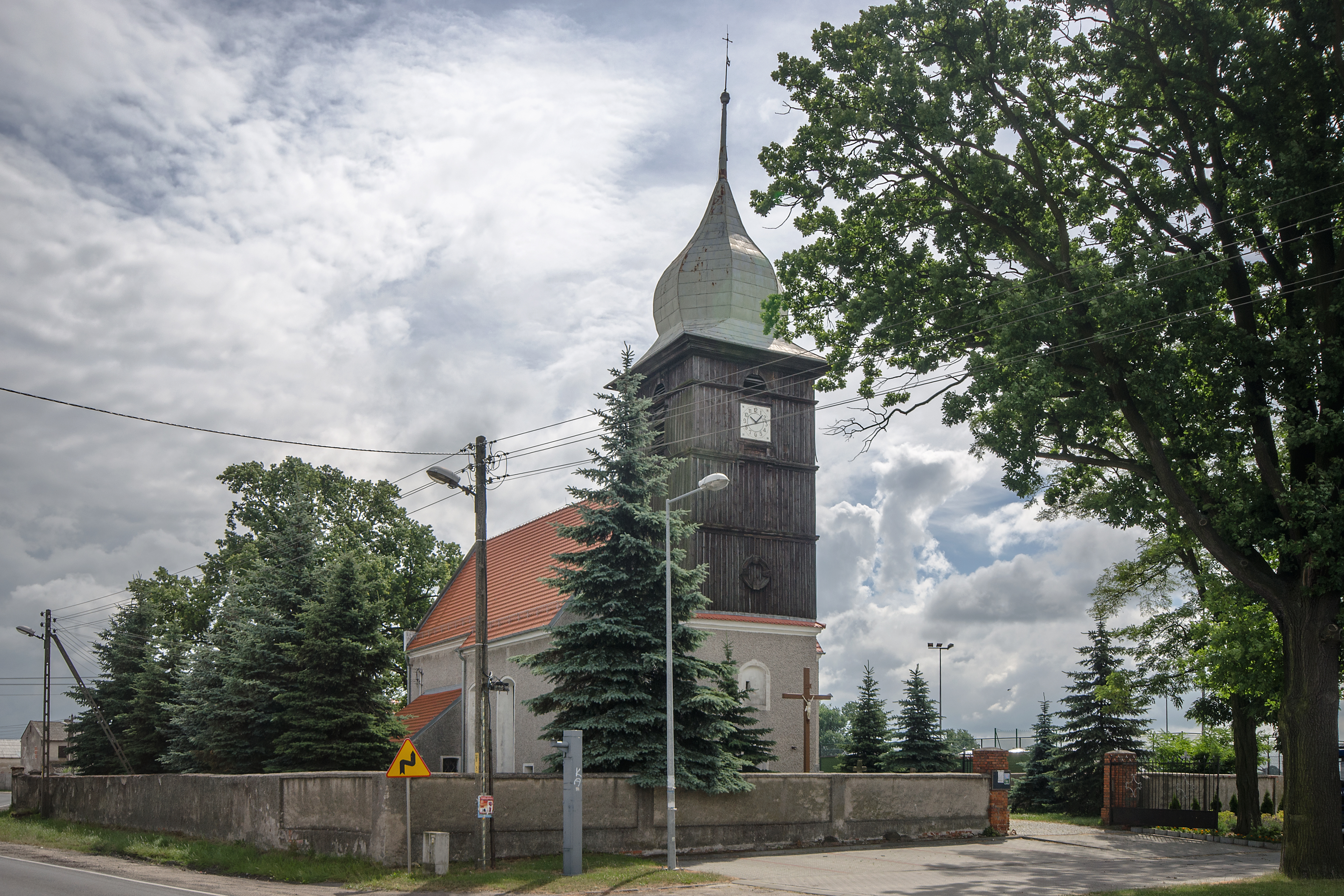

- Location within Poland
- Coordinates: 51°14′38″N 16°17′08″E
- Country: Poland
- Voivodeship: Lower Silesian
- County: Legnica
- Gmina: Kunice

Spalona [spaˈlɔna] (German: Heinersdorf ), is a village in the administrative district of Gmina Kunice, within Legnica County, Lower Silesian Voivodeship, in south-western Poland.
