= Kunice (Valjevo) =

Settlement in Valjevo, Serbia

Kunice Кунице
- Village
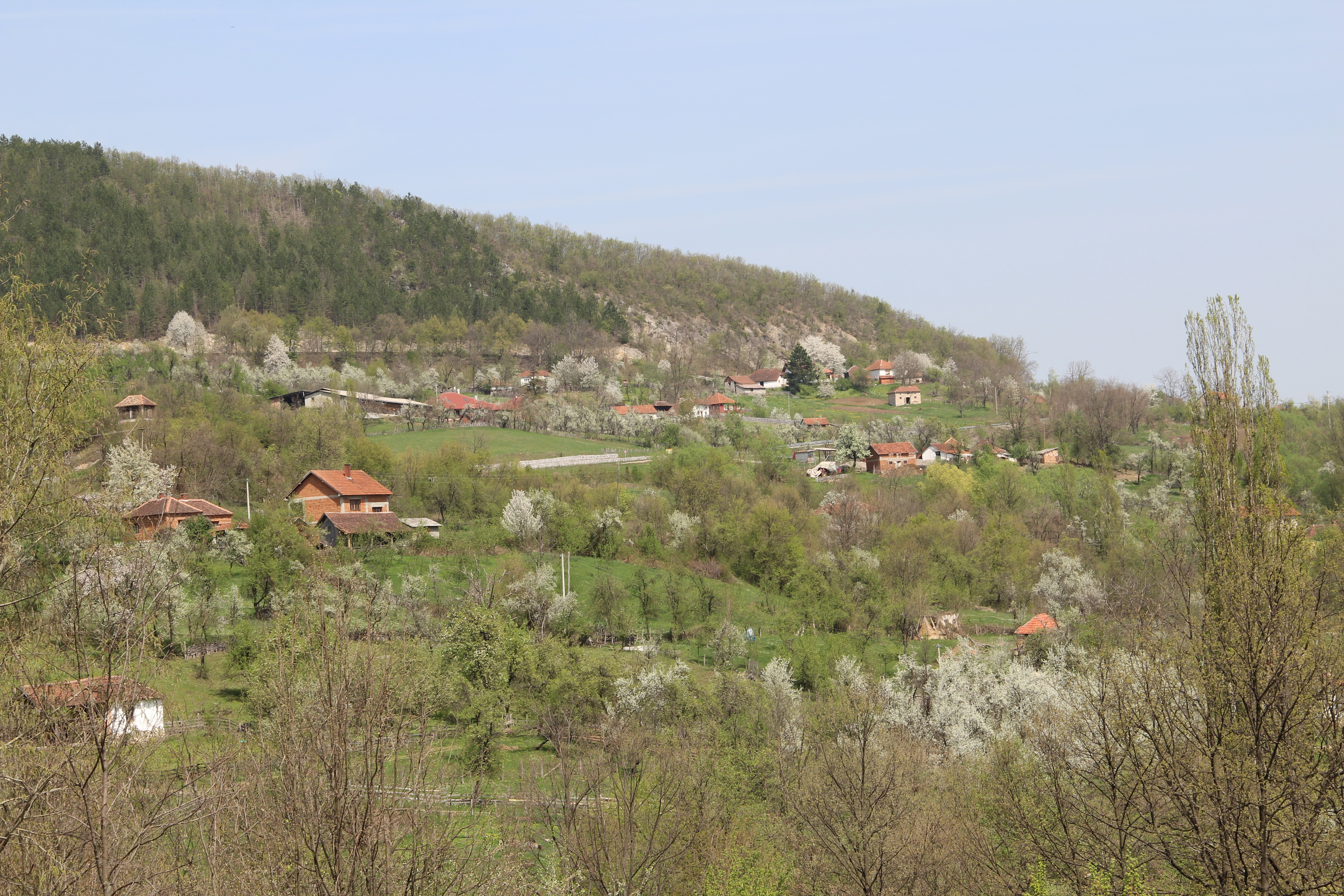
- Distant view of Kunice

- Location within Serbia
- Coordinates: 44°13′32″N 19°43′19″E
- Country: Serbia
- District: Kolubara
- Municipality: Valjevo
- Elevation: 434 m (1,424 ft)

Population (2011)
  - Total: 77
- Time zone: UTC+1 (CET)
  - Summer (DST): UTC+2 (CEST)

Kunice is a settlement in Valjevo, Serbia. It is located about 20 kilometers southwest of Valjevo, at an average elevation of 434 meters above sea level.
