= Ziemnice, Lower Silesian Voivodeship =

Ziemnice
- Village
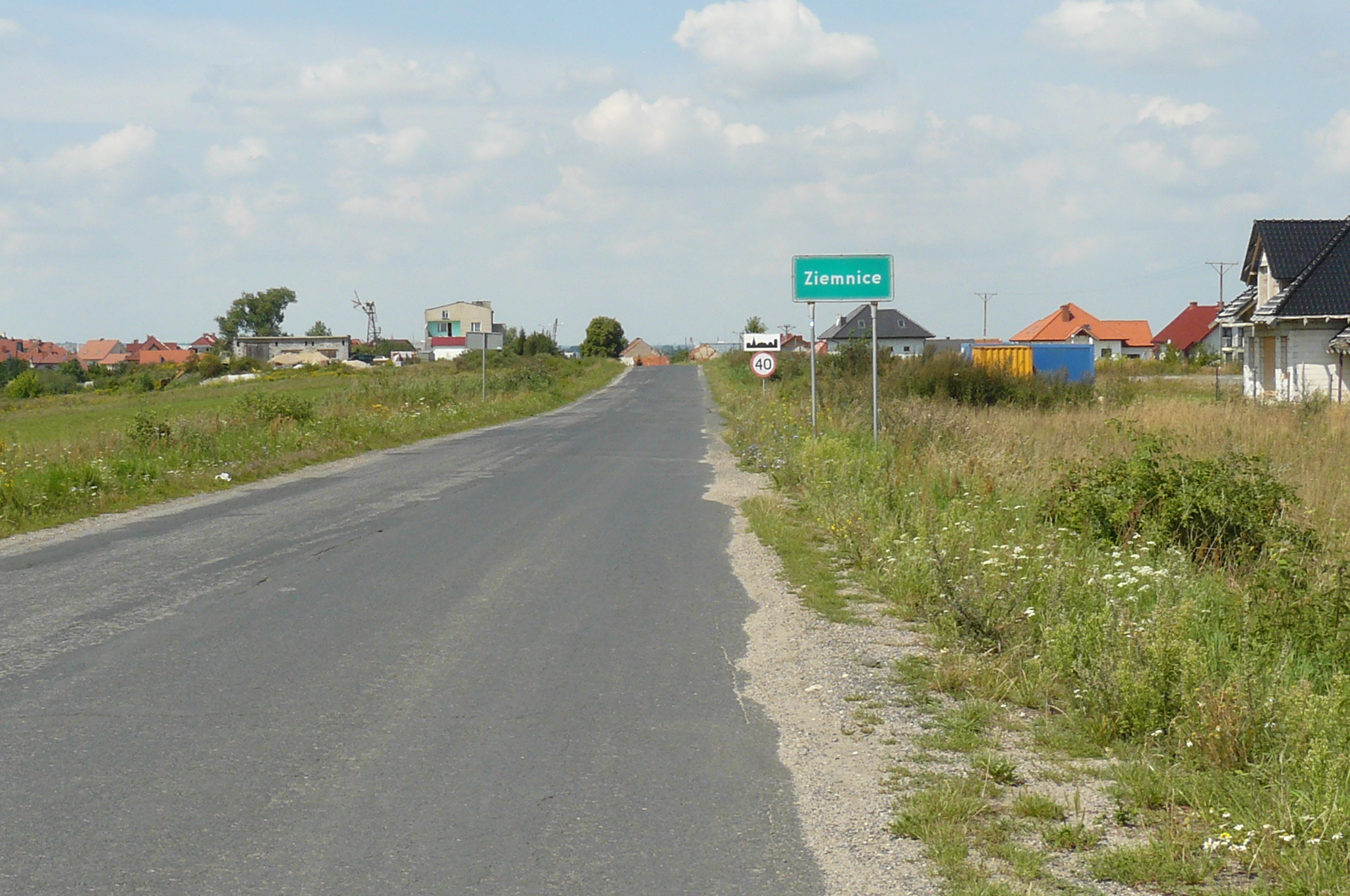

- Location within Poland
- Coordinates: 51°12′02″N 16°15′05″E
- Country: Poland
- Voivodeship: Lower Silesian
- County: Legnica
- Gmina: Kunice

Population
  - Total: 304
- Time zone: UTC+1 (CET)
  - Summer (DST): UTC+2 (CEST)
- Vehicle registration: DLE
- Website: http://www.ziemnice.pl

Ziemnice [ʑɛmˈɲit͡sɛ] is a village in the administrative district of Gmina Kunice, within Legnica County, Lower Silesian Voivodeship, in south-western Poland.
