= Kunice (Blansko District) =

- Municipality
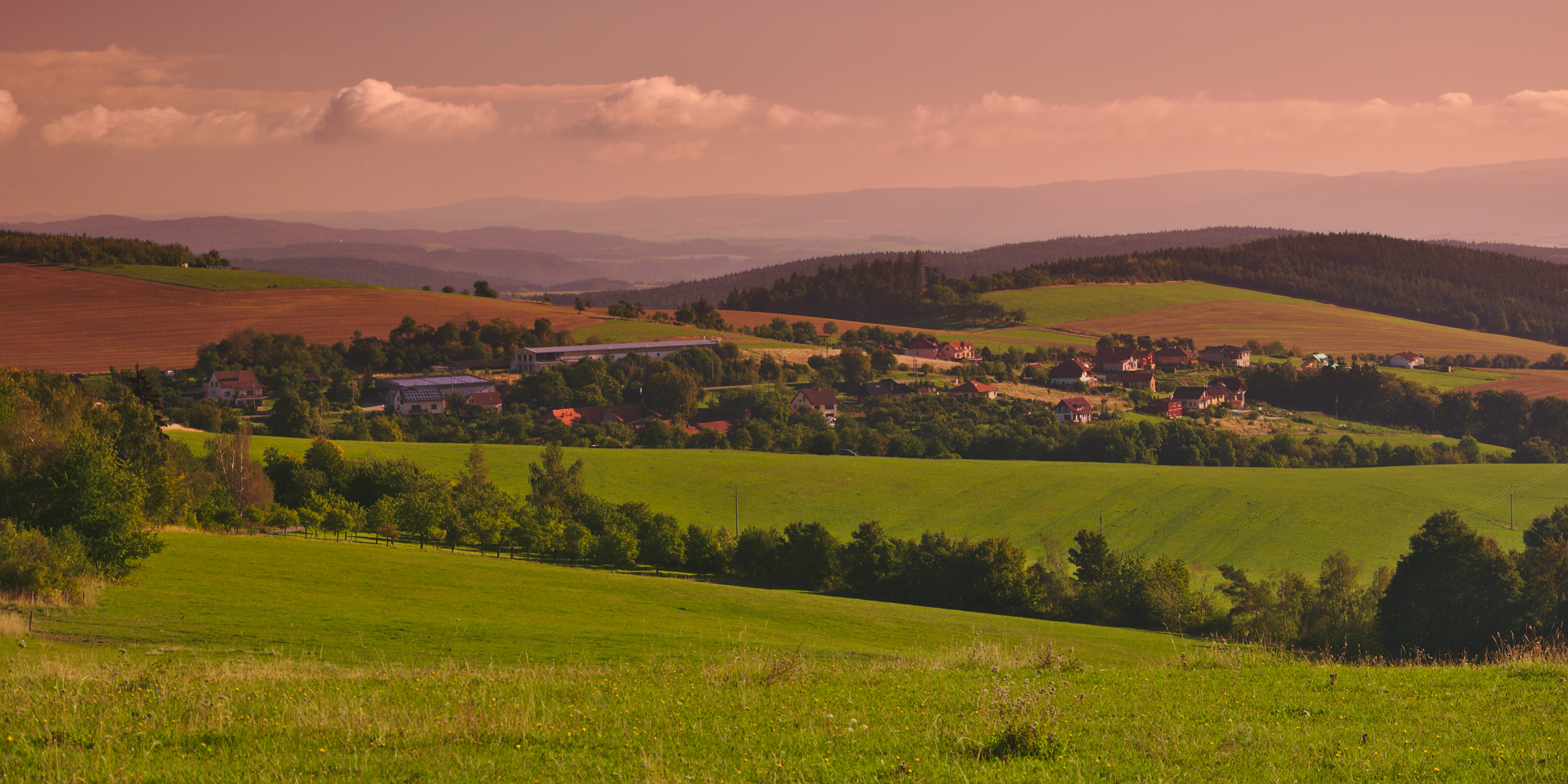
- View from the south

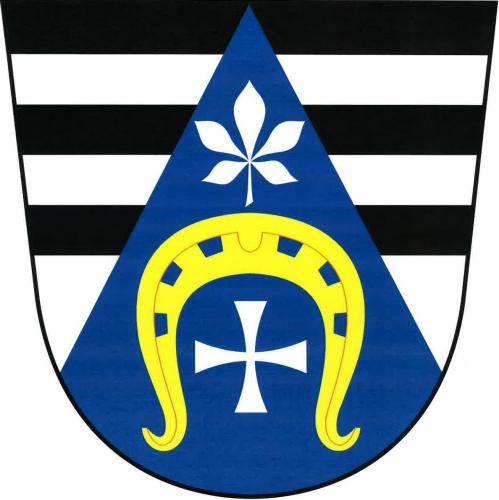
- Flag Coat of arms

- Location in the Czech Republic
- Coordinates: 49°28′44″N 16°29′27″E
- Country: Czech Republic
- Region: South Moravian
- District: Blansko
- First mentioned: 1349

Area
  - Total: 3.74 km^{2} (1.44 sq mi)
- Elevation: 536 m (1,759 ft)

Population (2026-01-01)
  - Total: 208
  - Density: 55.6/km^{2} (144/sq mi)
- Time zone: UTC+1 (CET)
  - Summer (DST): UTC+2 (CEST)
- Postal code: 679 71
- Website: www.kunice.com

Kunice is a municipality and village in Blansko District in the South Moravian Region of the Czech Republic. It has about 200 inhabitants.

Kunice lies approximately 18 kilometres (11 mi) north-west of Blansko, 33 km (21 mi) north of Brno, and 164 km (102 mi) south-east of Prague.

== Demographics ==
Historical population
Year	Pop.	±%
1869	266	—
1880	222	−16.5%
1890	233	+5.0%
1900	223	−4.3%
1910	233	+4.5%
1921	223	−4.3%
1930	197	−11.7%
1950	141	−28.4%
1961	137	−2.8%
1970	127	−7.3%
1980	132	+3.9%
1991	122	−7.6%
2001	115	−5.7%
2011	143	+24.3%
2021	195	+36.4%
Source: Censuses
