= Kunice, Lower Silesian Voivodeship =

Kunice
- Village
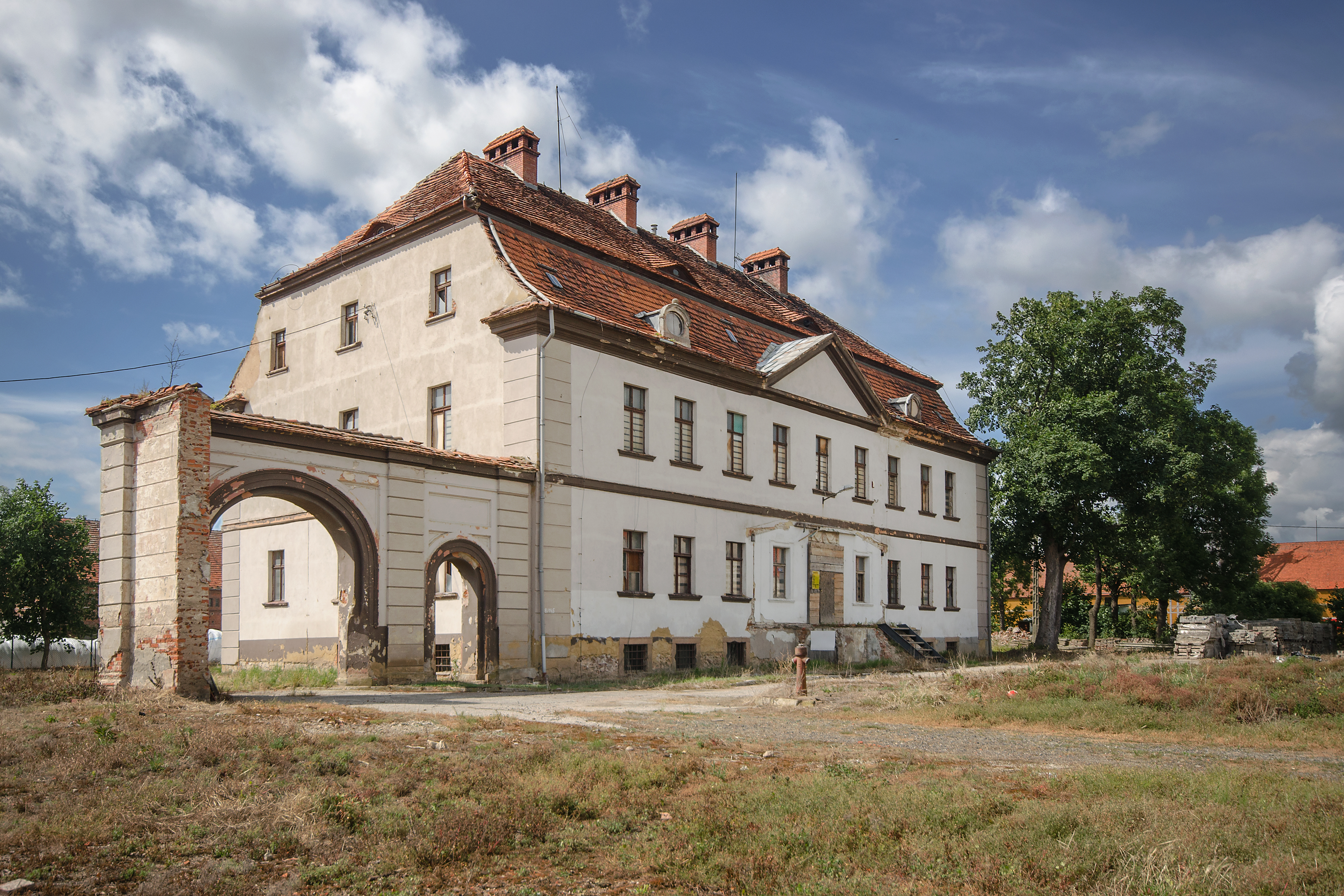
- Manor in Kunice

- Location within Poland
- Coordinates: 51°13′27″N 16°14′52″E
- Country: Poland
- Voivodeship: Lower Silesian
- County: Legnica
- Gmina: Kunice

Population
  - Total: 1,100

Kunice [kuˈɲit͡sɛ] (German: Kunitz) is a village in Legnica County, Lower Silesian Voivodeship, in south-western Poland. It is the seat of the administrative district (gmina) called Gmina Kunice.

It is served by Kunice railway station.
