= Joe Kryczka =

Canadian lawyer, judge and ice hockey administrator (1935–1991)

Joe Kryczka QC
- Born: June 4, 1935; Coleman, Alberta, Canada
- Died: January 11, 1991 (aged 55); Calgary, Alberta, Canada
- Education: University of Alberta
- Occupations: Lawyer, Justice on the Court of Queen's Bench of Alberta
- Known for: Canadian Amateur Hockey Association and Alberta Amateur Hockey Association president
- Awards: Canada's Sports Hall of Fame; Alberta Sports Hall of Fame

Joseph Julius Kryczka QC (/ˈkrɪskɑː/; June 4, 1935 – January 11, 1991) was a Canadian ice hockey administrator, coach and referee, and had a legal career as a lawyer and judge, where he was commonly known as "Justice Joe". He graduated from the University of Alberta, and played hockey with the Golden Bears. He practiced law in Calgary for more than 20 years, beginning in 1959 as a lawyer, becoming a judge, and was eventually elevated to a justice on the Court of Queen's Bench of Alberta.

His hockey administration career included tenures as president of the Alberta Amateur Hockey Association from 1967 to 1969, and later the Canadian Amateur Hockey Association from 1971 to 1973, and resolving disagreements in Canadian hockey. When the Western Canada Hockey League broke away from the governing body, Kryczka was able to reunite the league with the rest of Canada, which maintained the continuity of the threatened Memorial Cup. He brought Alberta hockey back under the national umbrella when it resigned, and later dealt with the World Hockey Association when it raided rosters of Canadian junior teams without compensation. Kryczka was the lead negotiator in securing the agreement for Canada to play the Soviet Union at the 1972 Summit Series. His negotiating skills went unrecognized at the time, and his contributions were overshadowed by Alan Eagleson.

Kryczka was later a director with the Calgary Cowboys, and played a key role with Calgary's successful bid for the 1988 Winter Olympics. He was inducted into both Canada's Sports Hall of Fame and the Alberta Sports Hall of Fame in 1990, for his service to Canadian sports and ice hockey.

== Early life ==
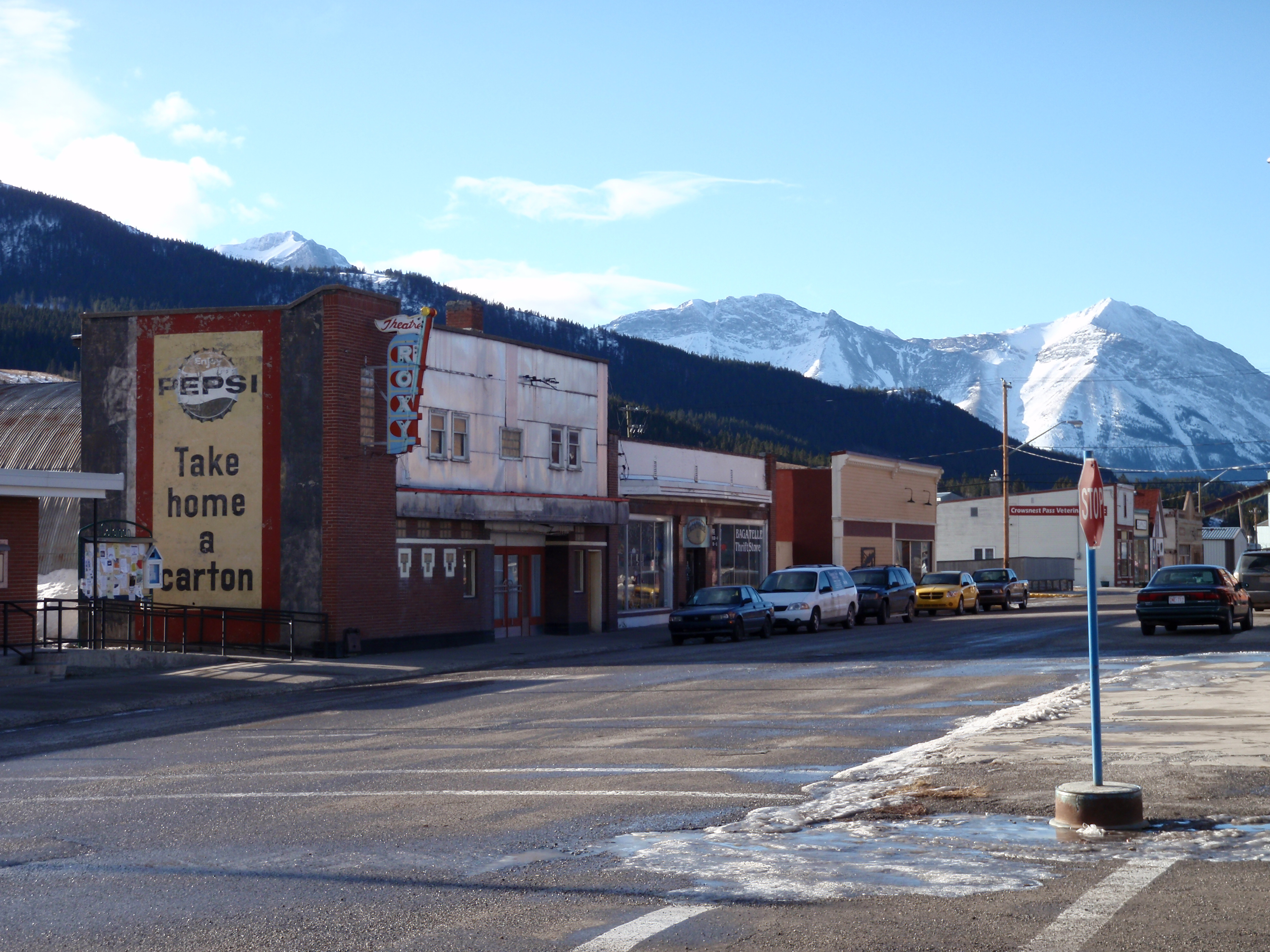
Kryczka was born and raised in the village of Coleman, Alberta.

Joseph Julius Kryczka was born on June 4, 1935, in Coleman, Alberta. He grew up playing minor ice hockey until the juvenile age level in Coleman. He played on the 1949–50 midget team which won the Alberta championship, and was captain of the juvenile team in the 1951–52 season. He attended Coleman High School, and received a bursary from the Elks of Canada for having the highest marks in grade nine. He graduated with honours in 1953 as the class valedictorian.

Kryczka enrolled at University of Alberta in 1953, and graduated with a Bachelor of Arts degree in 1957. He was active in student life, serving as president of both the political science and law clubs, and was secretary of the student council. He played junior baseball for his Coleman team in summers. He played three seasons of ice hockey as a defenceman with the Golden Bears, and was teammates with his brother Adam in 1955. He won three Dr. W. G. Hardy Trophy titles as a Western Canadian Intercollegiate Athletic Union champion in 1954, 1955 and 1956. He earned two varsity letters in university, but a shoulder injury ended his playing career. He completed his law degree in 1958 at the University of Alberta. The university awarded him a gold ring for scholastic achievements and the Lorne Calhoun Memorial Award for his contributions to student activities.

Kryczka became an articled clerk in Calgary under future Court of Appeal of Alberta justice David Clifton Prowse, and was called to the bar in 1959. He was originally associated with the law firm of Peter Lougheed in the early 1960s, and then became a partner of Mason and Kryczka. He later served as vice-president of the Alberta Young Liberal Association in 1966, and continued to practice law in Calgary until 1980.

== Alberta hockey ==
Kryczka began volunteering as community hockey coach in 1959, and also refereed in various leagues. He was elected to the executive committee of the Alberta Amateur Hockey Association (AAHA) in 1963, and served as the Calgary Booster Club president from 1964 to 1965. He was elected second vice-president of the AAHA in September 1966, and became its president in October 1967.

Kryczka's presidency of the AAHA coincided with the formation of the Western Canada Hockey League (WCHL), which had teams in Alberta, Saskatchewan and Manitoba. Various disputes arose with the WCHL, because it was outside of the jurisdiction of the Canadian Amateur Hockey Association (CAHA), the governing body for the AAHA. In February 1969, the CAHA and Kryczka as president of the AAHA, were named in a lawsuit by the WCHL and its governing body, the Canadian Hockey Association. The WCHL sought development money for its players drafted by the National Hockey League (NHL), as per the draft agreement between the NHL and the CAHA, but the CAHA refused to distribute money to a league it did not sanction. Later that month, Kryczka gave an ultimatum to the Alberta Hockey Referees Association, stating that the AAHA would only use referees which did not officiate in the WCHL. The decision threatened to end an agreement from October 1968, where referees in Alberta formed an independent organization to officiates games for both governing bodies. Later in March, Kryczka suspended two referees who still worked games in the WCHL.

At the 1969 CAHA annual general meeting, Kryczka said that the WCHL succeeded in drawing many fans, and gave an opportunity for many young men to play in Western Canada. He also felt that CAHA branches such as Alberta, should be able to establish a major junior category for higher-level competition, similar to what the WCHL did across three provinces. The CAHA reorganized its committees to give more representation at the national level to its leagues, but the motion to have a major junior classification was defeated.

== CAHA vice-president ==
The Memorial Cup is awarded to the junior ice hockey champion of Canada, and its status was threatened in 1971 while Kryczka was vice-president of the CAHA.

Kryczka was elected vice-president of the CAHA in May 1969. In September 1969, he was optimistic that the CAHA and the WCHL would be able to agree on reuniting. He felt it would be possible if the WCHL agreed to appropriately compensate CAHA teams from which players were signed, and that there would be no expansion into cities with an existing CAHA team. He further confirmed that the CAHA had not approved of its players being signed by the WCHL, or relocation into its territory. He said that the CAHA would not agree to those demands of the WCHL, which are against CAHA regulations. Later in 1969, Canada and the CAHA withdrew from play in the Ice Hockey World Championships over a dispute with the International Ice Hockey Federation (IIHF) regarding the use of professionals, which began a continuing feud between Kryczka, and IIHF president Bunny Ahearne.

The CAHA added multiple vice-presidents as of 1970, and Kryczka was elected first vice-president by acclamation on May 29, 1970. He took objection to Clarence Campbell stating that the NHL may need to revert to direct ownership of teams, because of concessions made to the WCHL, and having different age limits across Canada's junior hockey system. Kryczka felt that the CAHA adequately resolved its disagreements with the WCHL, and did not need NHL personnel getting involved. He stated that the 1971 Memorial Cup would not likely be played, due to the Ontario Hockey Association Junior A division and the Quebec Junior Hockey League being in disagreement with the number overage players in the WCHL. He mentioned the potential for changing regulations at the upcoming general meeting, requiring teams to agree to the competition in order to receive development funds from the NHL agreement.

== CAHA president ==
=== First year ===
Kryczka succeeded Earl Dawson as president of the CAHA, on May 29, 1971. The role also made him a director with Hockey Canada for two years. He hoped to make the CAHA financially independent of both the NHL and the Government of Canada, and become more of an administrative body. Shortly after becoming president, Kryczka announced a resolution to the Memorial Cup competition, where the Ontario and Quebec leagues agreed to compete with the Western Canada teams which gave up having extra overage players. As part of the agreement, all three leagues were invited to participate in the meetings to renew the CAHA-NHL contract when it expired in 1972.

In June 1971, he announced that the CAHA had rejected an invitation from the IIHF to return to play in the World Championships, since Canada would still not be able to use its professional players. Later that year in September, Kryczka stated that the CAHA had not been invited to play in the 1972 Winter Olympics in Sapporo, and accused Ahearne of political grandstanding for saying that Canada could be removed from the IIHF for its refusal to play.

Kryczka met with Harold Wright of the Canadian Olympic Association (COA) in September to review the situation, and Wright confirmed that the COA received an invitation to the Winter Olympics on July 28. Wright felt that the decision was in disregard to recreational hockey in Canada, and that the CAHA should send a team, as the Olympics was a different and unrelated tournament, compared to the World Championships. The CAHA was urged by the COA to send an amateur team, since the Canadian Interuniversity Athletics Union (CIAU) proposed sending a team in lieu of the CAHA.

Despite the discussions, Kryczka was committed to the CAHA's withdrawal from international play, until it could use its best players against the Europeans. He stated that Canada would voice its concerns at the next IIHF general meeting in the summer of 1972. He felt that the IIHF should allow professionals in the World Championships similar to FIFA, and reiterated that the CAHA had a good relationship with the NHL, which would release such players for an event. Kryczka remained open to other competitions, which included the Izvestia Cup.

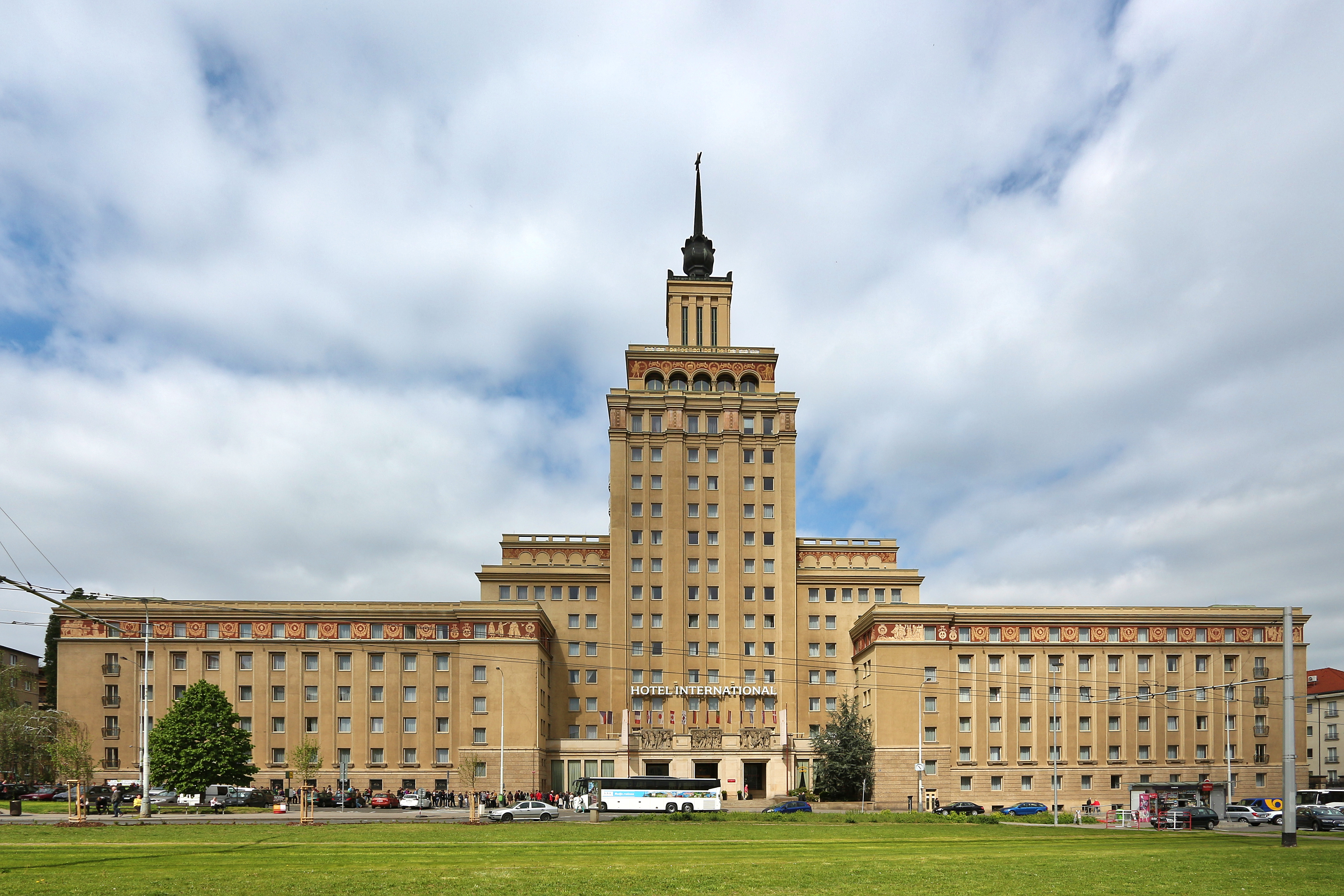
The Hotel International Prague, where negotiations took place for the 1972 Summit Series.

Meanwhile, Kryczka had been collaborating for two years with Charles Hay from Hockey Canada, in attempts to convince the Soviet Union to play Canada in a hockey series allowing professional players. In February 1972, the Canadian Bureau of Public Affairs empowered Kryczka, Hay and Lou Lefaive from Sport Canada, to oversee diplomatic efforts to return Canada to international ice hockey, and gave them needed assistance from Canadian embassies in Europe, and specifically the Embassy of Canada in Moscow. Other notable Canadians involved in the process included Gordon Juckes from the CAHA, Doug Fisher and Allan Scott from Hockey Canada, Robert Ford the Canadian ambassador in Moscow, and translator Aggie Kukulowicz who worked at Air Canada in Moscow.

The negotiations for a Canada-Soviet series were finalized at the Hotel International Prague during the 1972 World Ice Hockey Championships. Kryczka was chosen as the lead negotiator on behalf of the Canadian delegation due to his legal background. He also went into the negotiations with an understanding of the Russian language, but never revealed this to the Soviets. As a child, his neighbours were Russian immigrants who never spoke to him in English. After each day of negotiating, he informed Hay of what the Soviets had said to each other. Kryczka later gave an interview to journalist Jim Coleman, and said that the Soviets had previously decided they could defeat any NHL team, and drew out negotiations to get more concessions on the rules of play.

The final agreement negotiated by Kryczka stipulated that Soviet players were to be paid CA$5,000 per game in Canada, and Canadian players were to be paid 5,000 Rbls per game in Moscow. It also stipulated the choice of referees was acceptable to both parties. It was signed on April 18, 1972, and agreed to an eight-game series where both Team Canada and the Soviet Team were allowed unrestricted rosters which included professionals. The two-page document had no official seal or letterhead, but included the signatures of Kryczka, Andrey Starovoytov as the general secretary of the Soviet Union Ice Hockey Federation, and the approvals of Ahearne as the president of the IIHF, and former CAHA president Fred Page as the vice-president of the IIHF.

Kryczka and Starovoytov announced the agreement later the same day, but Kryczka did not promise that Canada return to the playing at the World Championships. After the successful negotiations with the Soviets, he intended to table a similar proposal for the World Ice Hockey Championships at the next summer congress of the IIHF. United Press International reported that upcoming Soviet series likely indicated Canada's return to international play, and the IIHF would likely vote in favour of Canada's proposal to include professionals. Kryczka was also encouraged by feedback from IIHF vice-president Page, who was keeping the CAHA informed of international matters, and was also a CAHA director-at-large.

=== Second year ===
Kryczka began his second year as president by speaking to delegates at the 1972 general meeting of the CAHA. He warned of a government report which recommended a paid commissioner to run and oversee amateur hockey in Canada. He felt that would take away the incentive for parents to volunteer in amateur hockey, and kill programs at the grass roots levels of hockey. The meeting saw the CAHA vote down a rule amendment that would have allowed Karen Koch to play on a men's team, and Kryczka announced that the CAHA would study its organizational structure, and would be prepared to include female teams and leagues in the future. Also at the meeting, the AAHA gave notice of resignation from the CAHA, due to differences arising from the CAHA-NHL agreement. The AAHA felt that the CAHA should charge registration fees to players for its administration fees, rather than be bound by the NHL and rely on it for income. Kryczka remained confident that an Alberta branch could be reformed, and operate with the CAHA. He announced in August 1972, that the AAHA rejoined the CAHA after working out their differences.

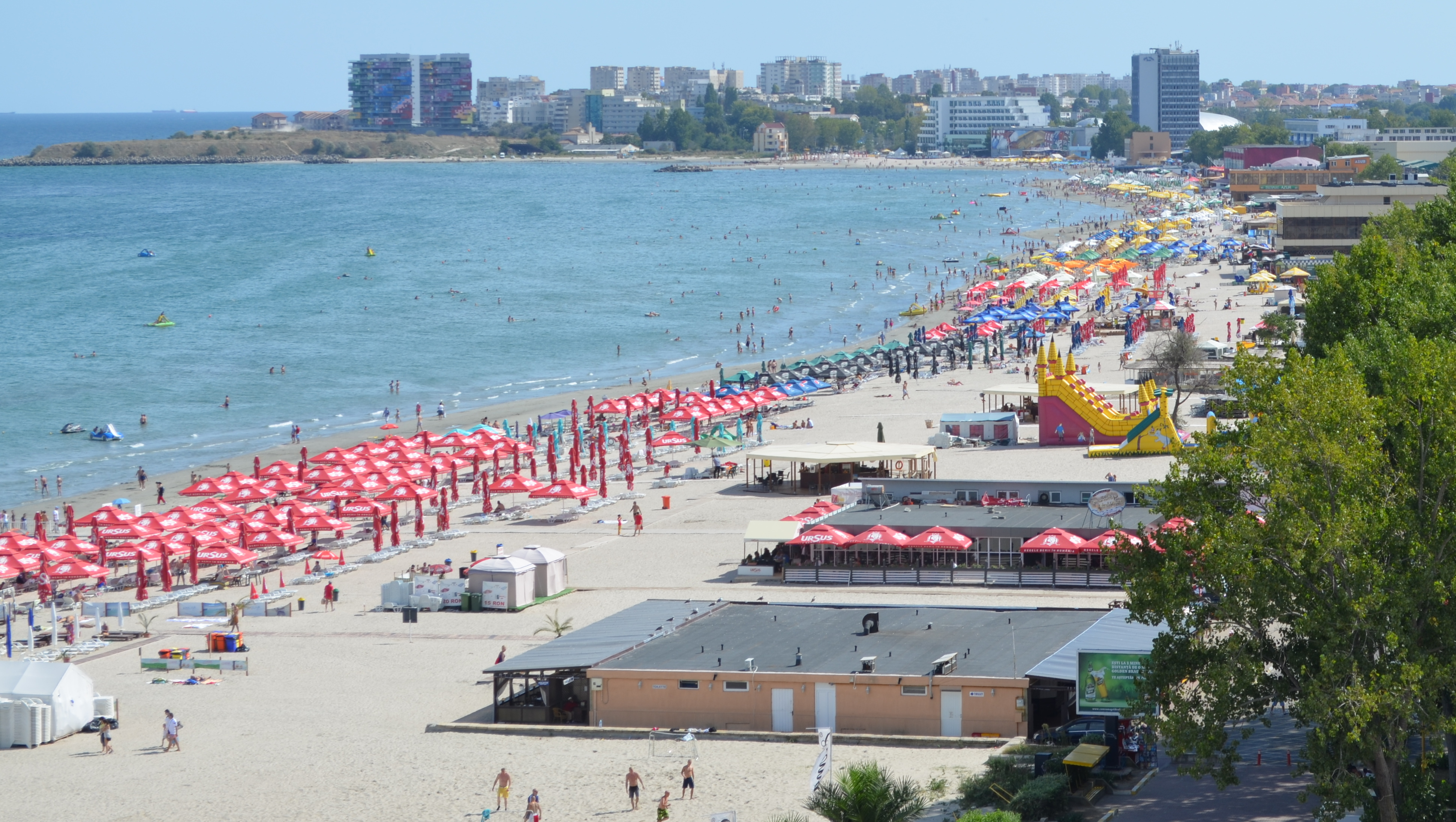
The 1972 summer congress of the IIHF was held in the Romanian Black Sea resort district of Mamaia, in Constanța.

Kryczka went to the 1972 summer congress of the IIHF in Mamaia, Romania, to make his proposal for professionals at the World Championships, and was also expecting a North American delegate to replace Ahearne as IIHF president. The president's position had alternated every three years between Europe and North America, as part of the agreement for the CAHA and the Amateur Hockey Association of the United States (AHAUS) to join the IIHF in 1947. Kryczka had been a vocal opponent of IIHF president Ahearne, and criticized Ahearne's meetings as non-parliamentary, and not following acceptable procedures. The North America delegation made Page its unanimous nominee, but instead of Page being acclaimed president, Ahearne declared a vote must take place, and the Europeans disapproved of the nomination. Kryczka was subsequently nominated by the United States, but he declined the position feeling he wasn't experienced enough. After a brief recess and then CAHA secretary Juckes also being voted down, Ahearne was reelected in lieu of an acceptable North American candidate.

The roster for the Canada-Soviet series was chosen in August, by a committee composed of members from the CAHA, Hockey Canada, the NHL, and the National Hockey League Players' Association (NHLPA). Kryczka was disappointed that players from the World Hockey Association (WHA) were excluded from the series since he felt the team should be open all Canadians regardless of which professional league they played for, but he ultimately accepted the decision. The CAHA scheduled additional exhibition games for the Canadian team while in Europe playing the Soviets, that caused Kryczka and Ahearne to disagree over the television rights of a game against Czechoslovakia, when the CAHA refused to pay royalties to the IIHF which threatened to not sanction the game.

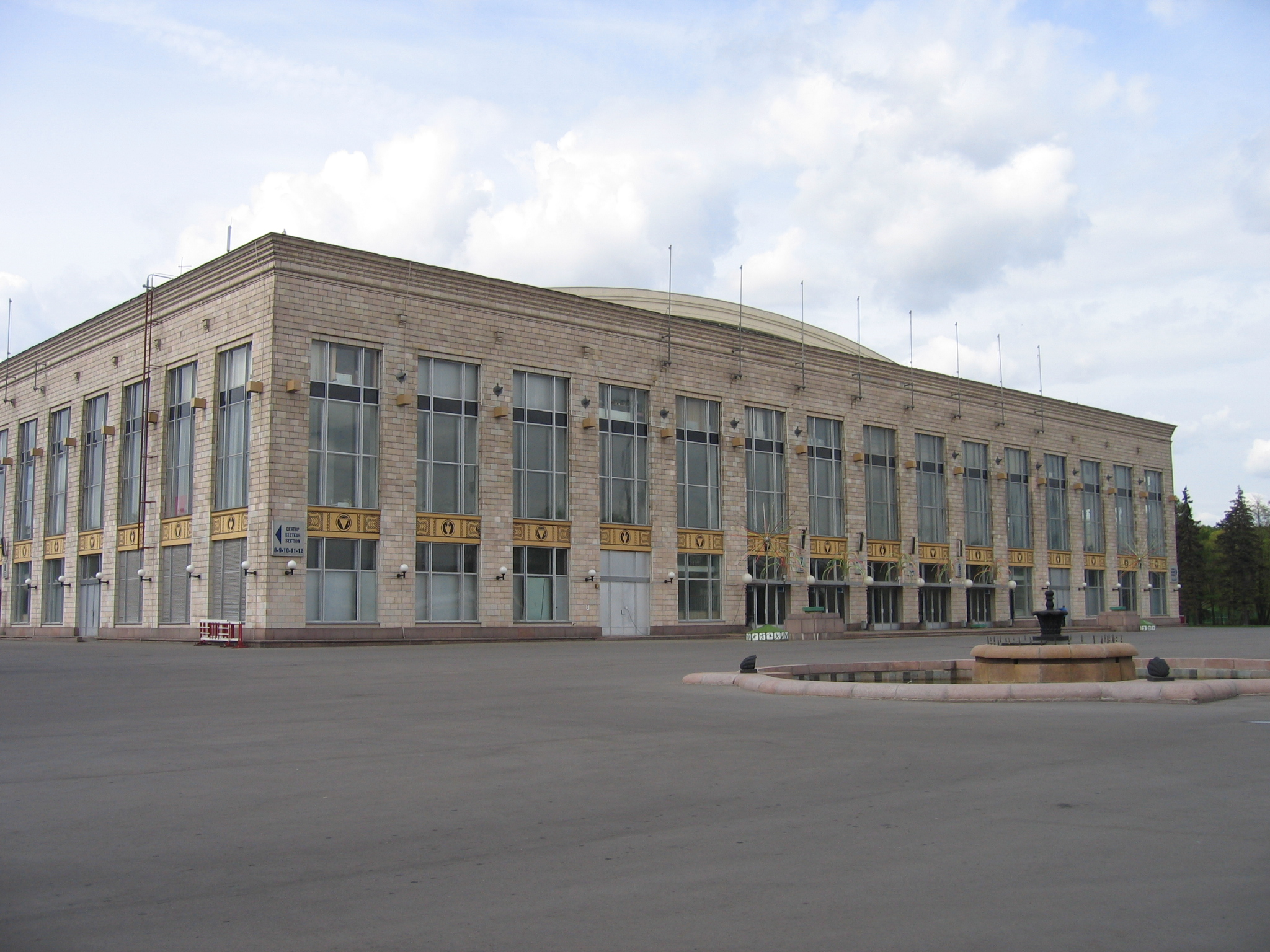
The final four games of the Canada-Soviet series were played at the Palace of Sports of the Central Lenin Stadium in Moscow.

The Canada-Soviet series began September 2, 1972, and Canadians believed they would easily defeat the Soviets. Instead, after seven games it was tied with 3 wins each and a draw. The Canadians and Soviets disagreed over who should referee the final eighth match. Kryczka was against having the West German officials Josef Kompalla and Franz Baader referee the game, and demanded to have Ove Dahlberg of Sweden, and Rudolf Baťa of Czechoslovakia. A compromise was reached that included Kompalla and Baťa as referees for the eighth game, and in the pregame ceremony Kryczka and Alan Eagleson presented the Soviet hosts with a totem pole as a gift from Canada. Canada went on to win the final game by a 6–5 score, and won the series 4 games to three, with a draw.

Kryczka received little credit at the time for his role in the series and was overshadowed by Eagleson, with whom he shared a mutual dislike. Eagleson was attending the World Championships and was not part of the negotiations, but he was the first person to phone Canada from Prague, and take credit for the event by reporting the agreement. Journalist Remy Greer argued that, "if it wasn’t for the negotiating prowess of Kryczka, the series might never have happened". Eagleson felt that series was made by the NHL players, and gave no thanks to others involved. He felt that Kryczka only helped with the totem pole, and nothing else. Kryczka's wife later said that she needed to sit between them at each game, as they were both "loud-mouthed lawyers" with a "hate-hate relationship".

The Canada-Soviet series later became known as the Summit Series, and fostered a source of national pride as a significant historical event. Kryczka said that Canadian amateur hockey gained from the series because the CAHA earned $100,000 as its share of the profits, and it would be probable to see another similar professional event due to public demand. He also speculated that the success of the CAHA in negotiating the series, may render the rival Hockey Canada structure obsolete. He was open to more tournaments and games which followed IIHF statutes, and condemned reports that the NHL and the NHLPA were trying to negotiate international games on their own for the sake of keeping profits to themselves, instead of following proper international procedures. He felt that the CAHA deserved its credit for developing the international game, and opening the door for the NHL to play the Soviets. He said that European clubs were interested in playing, as long as sanctioning went through the IIHF, the CAHA or AHAUS. Canada later played the Soviets again in the 1974 Summit Series, which led to the establishment of the Canada Cup in 1976, and the subsequent return of Team Canada to the World Championships in 1977.

After the 1972 series, Kryczka gave a directive to the minor ice hockey council of the CAHA to find ways to improve its youth development system, and catch up to the Soviet system. He looked towards junior hockey as the next big stage for international hockey to be played at the IIHF World U20 Championship being planned in 1974, and said that Canada and the USA had been collaborating on a planned 1975 event. He also said that at the junior age level, there would be no concerns over who is or is not a professional player, and that the CAHA agreed to send the reigning Memorial Cup champion to represent Canada at the events. Kryczka announced in January 1973, that he would not seek reelection as CAHA president.

Kryczka's remaining four months as president were occupied by dealing with the WHA competing for junior-aged players, and threatening the CAHA's existing draft and development agreement with the NHL. Kryczka had previously sent a letter to WHA president Gary Davidson, requesting the league honour the age at which players become professionals, as agreed with the NHL. On February 15, 1973, the WHA permitted its teams one month to negotiate and sign any junior, college, or non-professional of amateur draft age, which Kryczka called disruptive to junior hockey. He warned CAHA teams that any player which signed a professional contract would be ruled ineligible to continue playing in the CAHA. Kryczka and Juckes set up a meeting on February 23, 1973, between the CAHA, each of its three leagues, and the WHA to the discuss attempted signings of junior players without paying development fees. When the Houston Aeros signed underage players Marty Howe and Mark Howe to professional contracts, Kryczka stated that the WHA was continuing to undermine the junior hockey system in Canada. In his final speech as president of the CAHA at the 1973 general meeting, he expressed his disappointment in the negotiations being broken off by WHA which claimed development fees being too high. He felt that the WHA was trying to break apart unity by attempting to deal directly with the WCHL instead of the CAHA, and he also discounted rumors that the Saskatchewan Amateur Hockey Association wanted to break away from the CAHA.

== Later life ==
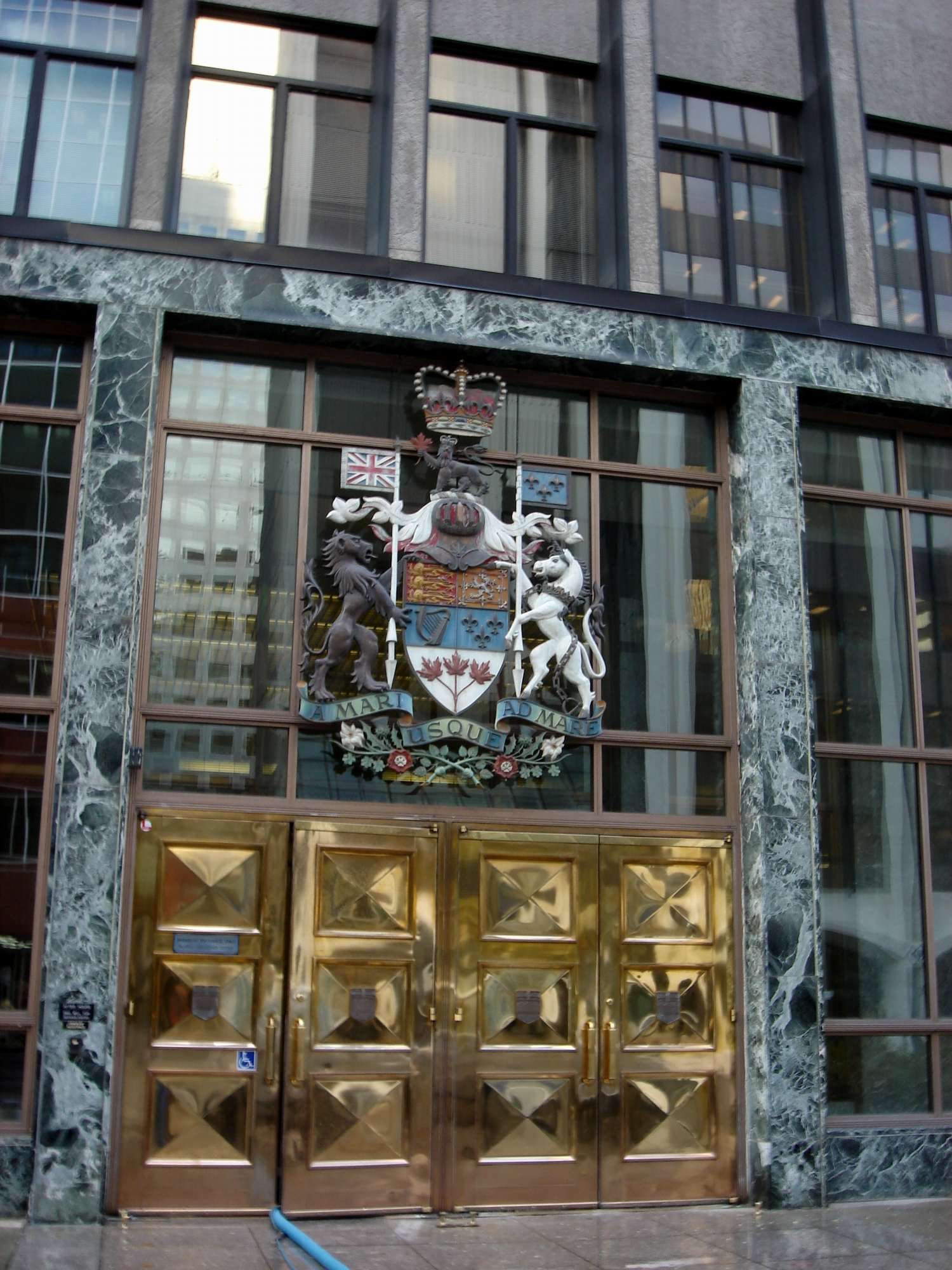
Entrance to the Court of Queens Bench of Alberta in Calgary, where Kryczka served as a justice

Kryczka was succeeded as president of the CAHA by Jack Devine, on May 25, 1973 at the annual meeting. After his term as president, Kryczka was appointed chairman of the CAHA rules committee, and was responsible for enforcing discipline. He fined the Humboldt Broncos management $500, for refusing to play game six of the 1973 Centennial Cup playoffs. At the 1974 general meeting, the rules committee aimed to reduce eye injuries and obscenities directed at referees, and empowered the officials to enforce the appropriate rules more strictly. At the 1975 general meeting, the rules committee dealt with the increase of violence in hockey, recommended more severe penalties for cross-checking and high-sticking above the shoulders, raised the punishment for abuse of officials, and suggested game misconducts to deter fighting.

Kryczka was one of directors for the Calgary Cowboys team in the WHA. During the 1976 WHA playoffs versus the Quebec Nordiques, Kryczka felt that the league caved into the demands of Quebec, because the Nordiques threatened to abandon the series after a series of on-ice incidents. He agreed with the ultimate decision to continue the series, and avoid further discredit to the WHA. Kryczka stated that Calgary needed to build a replacement for the Stampede Corral, in order to remain competitive in major league hockey. When rumors surfaced that the Cowboys were considering moving to the proposed Copps Coliseum to be built in Hamilton, Ontario, he denied that the team wanted to move, and reiterated a commitment to the city.

Kryczka was recognized as a Queen's Counsel in 1975, for accomplishments as a lawyer, and contributions to the community. He was appointed to the Court of Queen's Bench of Alberta by Jean Chrétien in July 1980, the then Minister of Justice of Canada. Kryczka was subsequently sworn-in as a justice by W. R. Sinclair at Calgary. Kryczka served as a justice on the Court of Queen's Bench for the remainder of his life. As a lawyer, he acted as legal counsel for the Alberta Hockey Referees Association, when the organization disputed suspensions by the AAHA for referees officiating games in 1978 without wearing helmets.

Kryczka was named the director of legal affairs for Calgary's 1988 Winter Olympics bid in 1979. He worked with the Canadian Olympic Committee, and helped win the first Winter Olympic Games hosted in Canada. He met with members of the International Olympic Committee, and was confident that the American-led boycott of the 1980 Summer Olympics would not affect the voting for Calgary's bid. The Soviet Olympic Committee told Calgary bid president Frank King, that it would vote for Canada, if Kryczka ran the hockey events. After the Olympics, Kryczka became a director on the Canadian Olympic Development Association.

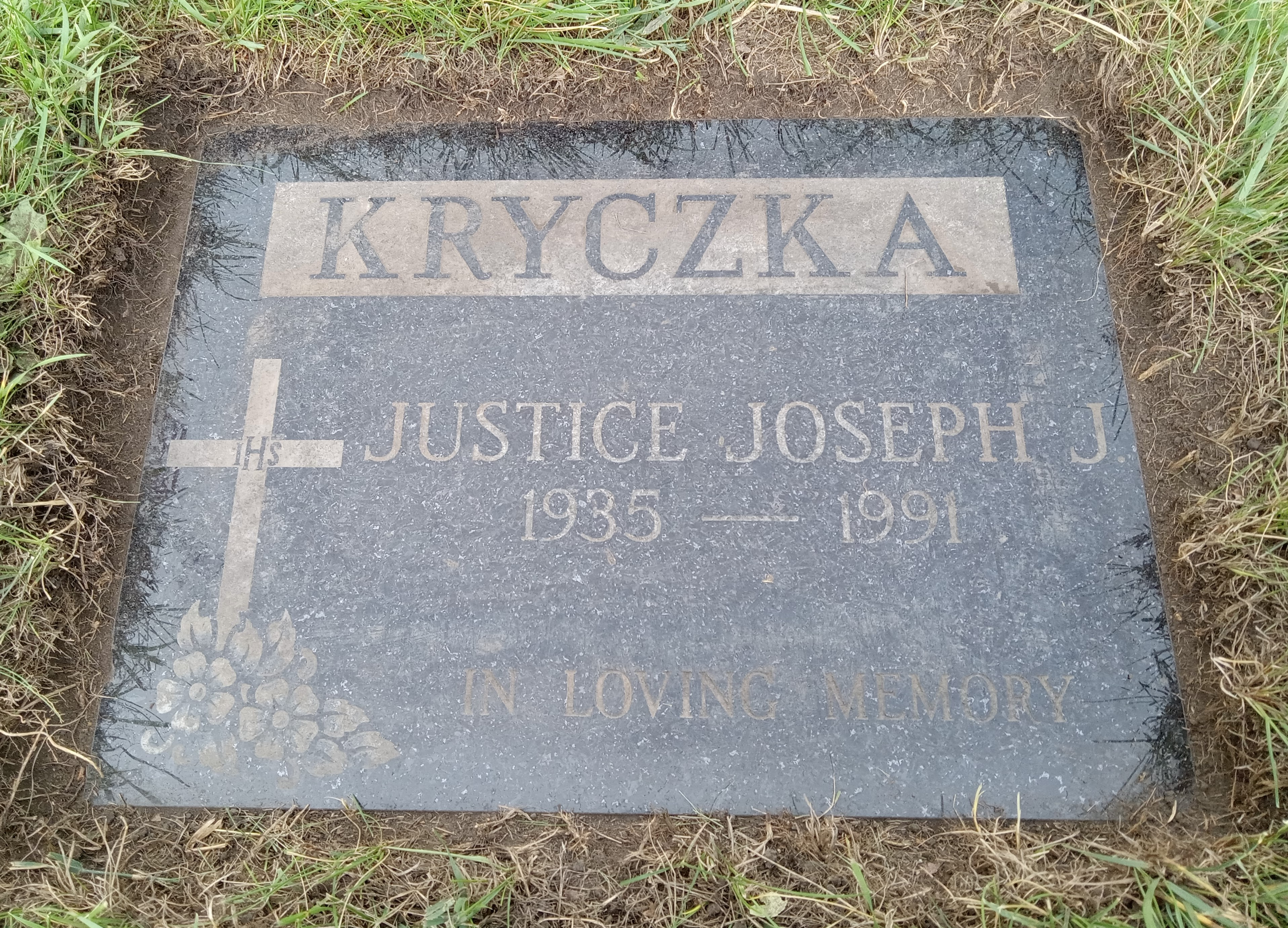
Kryczka's grave marker

Kryczka was later diagnosed with intestinal cancer. He died January 11, 1991, at Foothills Medical Centre, and was interred at St. Mary's Cemetery in Calgary.

== Family ==
Joe and brother Adam Kryczka (right) were teammates on the Golden Bears in 1955.

Kryczka was the second of three sons to Joseph and Maria Kryczka, who immigrated to Canada in 1934 from Zabawa, Poland. His father worked in the coalfields at Crowsnest Pass. His eldest brother Ted also played hockey for the Golden Bears, once participated in a Chicago Blackhawks training camp, and was a town counselor for Coleman from 1961 to 1978. His younger brother Adam was a goaltender on the Golden Bears, and is the namesake of the Adam Kryczka Memorial Trophy.

Kryczka was married to Marion North during summit series. At the time of his death, he was married to Beverley Kryczka. His son Patrick married Nicole Dunsdon, a former Miss Canada, and their son Spencer, played hockey for the Okotoks Oilers, and the Princeton Tigers. Kryczka's sister-in-law was Alberta politician Karen Kryczka, who was married to his brother Adam. His niece Kelly Kryczka was an Olympic medalist, and the daughter of Adam and Karen.

His family kept souvenirs from the Summit Series, including the original two-page document signed in Prague, which had been stored in a safe at his law office.

== Honours and awards ==
Kryczka was named the 1972 Air Canada Amateur Sports Executive of the Year. As part of its awards program, Air Canada donated a block of 20 air passes to the CAHA on behalf of Kryczka. He received a special achievement award in hockey from the Calgary Booster Club in 1972, and was made an honorary life member of the club in 1982. He was inducted into the Hockey Alberta Hall of Fame in 1984. Kryczka was recognized for his contributions to sports and ice hockey in Canada by induction as a builder into both the Alberta Sports Hall of Fame, and Canada's Sports Hall of Fame in 1990. Other honours include being made a life member of the CAHA, a life member of Hockey Alberta, and a life director of the Calgary Olympic Development Association. He is also the namesake of the Joe Kryczka Arena, at the Southland Leisure Centre in Calgary.

== Bibliography ==
- Henderson, Paul; Prime, Jim (2011). How hockey explains Canada: the sport that defines a country. Chicago, Illinois: Triumph Books. ISBN 978-1-60078-575-7.
- Macintosh, Donald; Hawes, Michael (1994). Sport and Canadian Diplomacy. Montreal & Kingston: McGill–Queen's University Press. p. 32. ISBN 0-7735-1161-X.
- Houston, William; Shoalts, David (1993). Eagleson: The Fall of a Hockey Czar. Whitby, Ontario: McGraw-Hill Ryerson. ISBN 0-07-551706-X.
- Mardson, Austin & Ernest (2011). Alberta's Judicial Leadership. Edmonton, Alberta: Golden Meteorite Press. ISBN 978-1-897472-32-3.
- McKinley, Michael (2014). It's Our Game: Celebrating 100 Years Of Hockey Canada. Toronto, Ontario: Viking Press. ISBN 978-0-670-06817-3.
- Ferguson, Bob (2005). Who's Who in Canadian Sport, Volume 4. Markham, Ontario: Fitzhenry & Whiteside. ISBN 1-55041-855-6.
- "31st Annual Sportsmen's Dinner" (PDF). Calgary Booster Club. 1986.
