= Choragwica Transmitter =

FM and TV facility in Wieliczka County, Poland

Chorągwica Transmitter
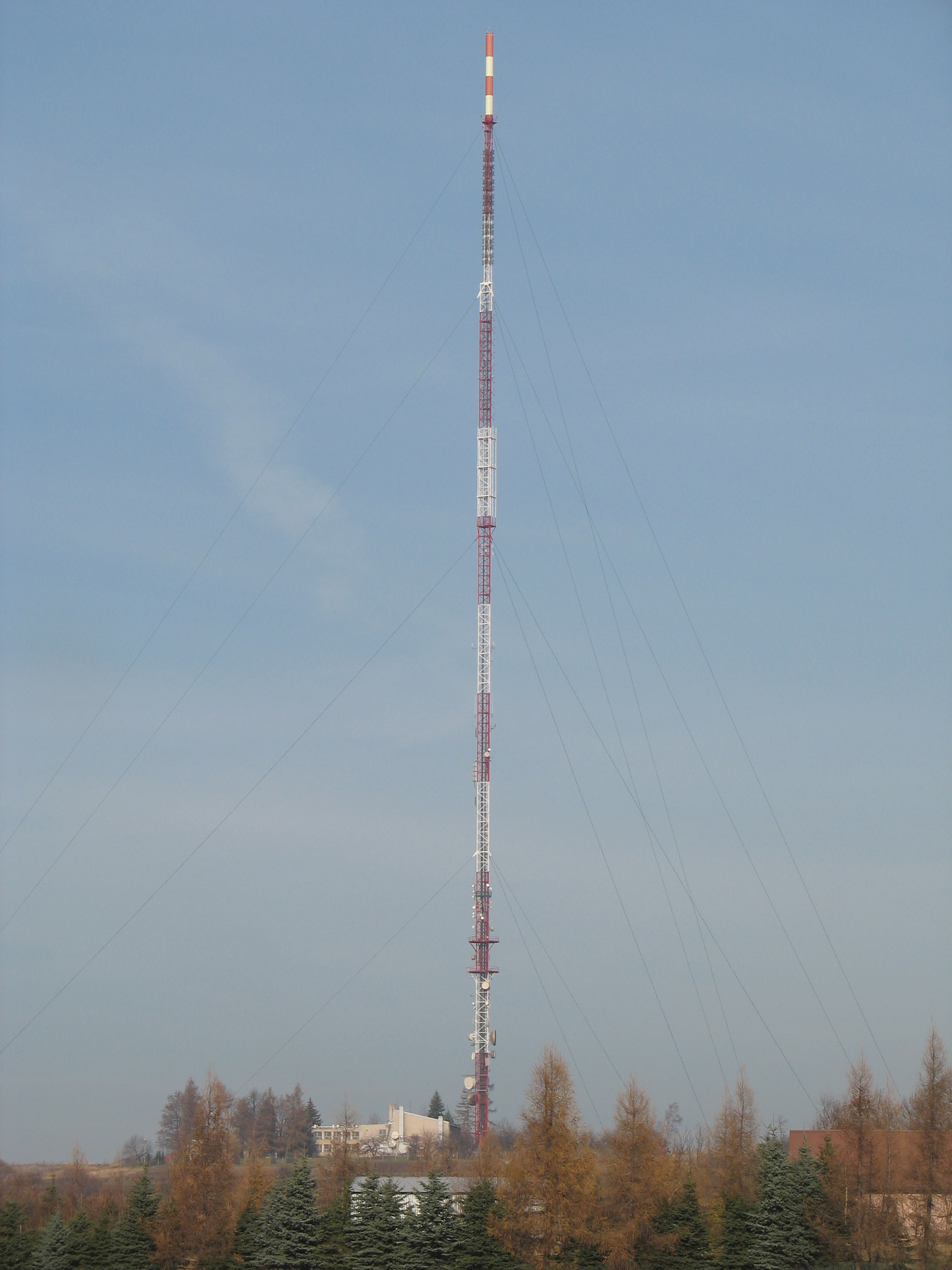

- Location within Poland

General information
- Status: Completed
- Type: Mast
- Location: Mietniów, Lesser Poland Voivodeship
- Coordinates: 49°57′31″N 20°04′54″E
- Completed: 22 December 1962

Height
- Height: 286 m (938.32 ft)

Chorągwica Transmitter is a facility for FM and TV broadcasting at Chorągwica near Mietniów, Wieliczka County in Poland. Chorągwica Transmitter uses as antenna tower a 286-metre-tall (938 ft) guyed mast, built in 1962.

== Transmitted programmes ==
=== Digital television ===
There were DVB-T and DVB-T2 test broadcasts on the station in 2011 and 2020 respectively.

This is a list of broadcasting multiplexes as of 2026:

Multiplex number	Programme in multiplex	Frequency	Channel	Power ERP	Polarisation	Antenna diagram	Modulation
MUX 1	Antena HD; Eska TV; Fokus TV; Polo TV; Stopklatka TV; TTV; TV Trwam; Wydarzenia 24	650 MHz	43	100 kW	Horizontal	ND	64 QAM
MUX 2	Polsat; TVN; TV4; TV Puls; TVN 7; Puls 2; TV6; Super Polsat	490 MHz	23	100 kW	Horizontal	ND	64 QAM
MUX 3	TVP1; TVP2; TVP Kraków; TVP Kultura; TVP Historia; TVP Sport; TVP Info; TVP ABC	482 MHz	22	130 kW	Horizontal	ND	64 QAM
MUX 6	Belsat; TVP Alfa; TVP Dokument; TVP Kobieta; TVP Nauka; TVP Polonia; TVP Rozrywka; TVP World	506 MHz	25	100 kW	Horizontal	ND	?
MUX 8	Hbb TV services; Nowa TV; Republika; ViDoc TV; WP; wPolsce24; Zoom TV	191,5 MHz	7	10 kW	Vertical	D	64 QAM

=== Radio ===
Program	Frequency	Transmission Power	Polarisation	Direction
PR1 Polskie Radio S.A.	89,40 MHz	60 kW	H	ND
RMF FM Radio Muzyka Fakty Sp. z o.o.	96 MHz	60 kW	H	ND
PR3 Polskie Radio S.A.	99,40 MHz	60 kW	H	ND
Radio Kraków Polskie Radio - Regionalna Rozgłośnia w Krakowie "Radio Kraków" S.A.	101,60 MHz	60 kW	H	ND
Radio ZET Radio ZET Sp. z o.o.	104,10 MHz	60 kW	H	ND
Radio Plus - Eurozet Sp. z o. o.	106,10 MHz	10 kW	H	ND
