= Barbara Marianowska =

Polish politician (1947–2012)

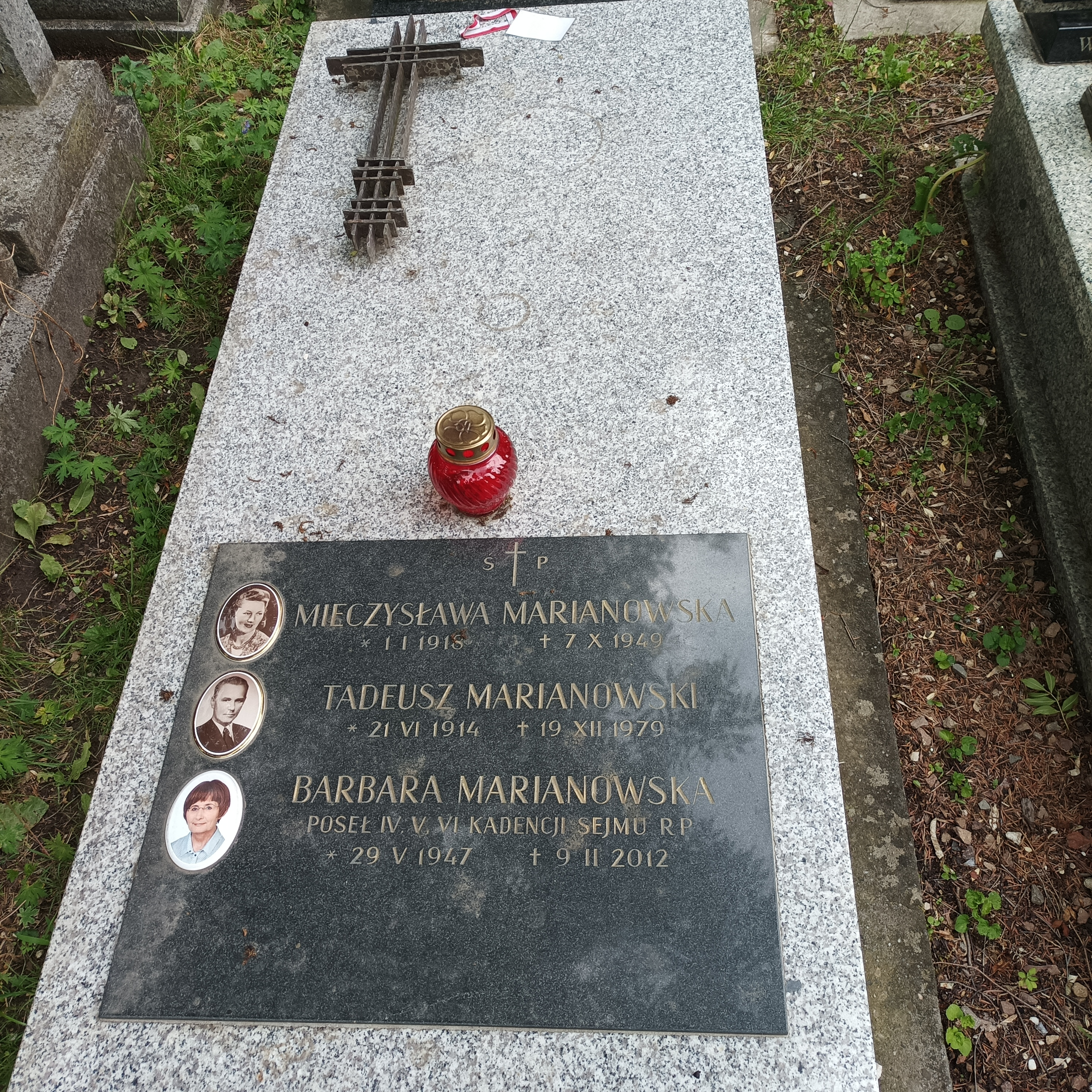
- Her grave

member of Sejm 2005-2007
- Incumbent
- Assumed office 25 September 2005

Personal details
- Born: 29 May 1947 Diddington
- Died: 9 February 2012 (aged 64) Koźmice Wielkie
- Party: Law and Justice

Barbara Marianowska, née Zabłocka (29 May 1947 – 9 February 2012) was a Polish politician.

Barbara Marianowska was born in 1947 in Diddington Resettlement Camp, England. Her parents were soldiers in the Polish Armed Forces in the east. After her arrival in Poland, she lived in Tarnow, Karwodrza and Tuchow. She then moved to Kraków where she completed her secondary education.

She holds a master's degree in economics, which she completed at the Academy of Economics in Kraków. Marianowska is married with two sons.

In 1980, she became a member of NSZZ Solidarity. During the Cold War, she worked for the underground weekly publication "Lesser Poland" in Kraków. Between 1992 and 1994 she was NSZZ's Treasury leader. She has also worked at the highest level in the Treasury at the Chambers of Commerce in Kraków. Marianowska possesses the best of qualifications and is a proficient manager. She is an experienced financial advisor in Cracow as well as an active member of three committees: the National Chamber of Commerce, the Association of Polish Accountants, and the Institute of Public Safety

She was elected to the Sejm on 25 September 2005, getting 12,498 votes in 15 Tarnów district as a candidate from the Law and Justice list.

She was also a member of Sejm 2001-2005. She died in Koźmice Wielkie, aged 64.

== See also ==
- Members of Polish Sejm 2005-2007
