= Rożnowa =

- Village
- Location within Poland
- Coordinates: 49°58′N 20°4′E
- Country: Poland
- Voivodeship: Lesser Poland
- County: Wieliczka
- Gmina: Wieliczka

Rożnowa [rɔʐˈnɔva] is a village in the administrative district of Gmina Wieliczka, within Wieliczka County, Lesser Poland Voivodeship, in southern Poland.
