= Dobranowice, Wieliczka County =

Dobranowice
- Village
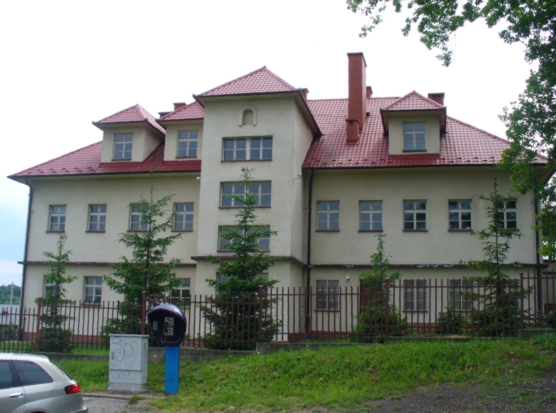
- School

- Location within Poland
- Coordinates: 49°56′36″N 20°6′53″E
- Country: Poland
- Voivodeship: Lesser Poland
- County: Wieliczka
- Gmina: Wieliczka

Dobranowice [dɔbranɔˈvit͡sɛ] is a village in the administrative district of Gmina Wieliczka, within Wieliczka County, Lesser Poland Voivodeship, in southern Poland.
