= Mała Wieś, Lesser Poland Voivodeship =

Mała Więś
- Village
- Location within Poland
- Coordinates: 50°0′N 20°7′E
- Country: Poland
- Voivodeship: Lesser Poland
- County: Wieliczka
- Gmina: Wieliczka

Mała Więś [ˈmawa ˈvjɛ̃ɕ] is a village in the administrative district of Gmina Wieliczka, within Wieliczka County, Lesser Poland Voivodeship, in southern Poland.
