= Grabie, Wieliczka County =

Grabie
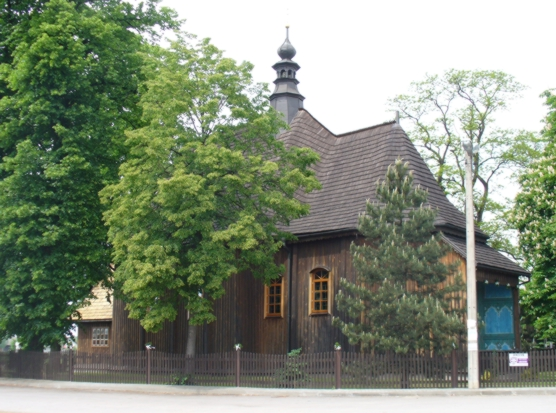
- Church in Grabie

- Location within Poland
- Coordinates: 50°3′N 20°8′E
- Country: Poland
- Voivodeship: Lesser Poland
- County: Wieliczka
- Gmina: Wieliczka

Population (2006)
  - Total: 600
- Time zone: UTC+1 (CET)
  - Summer (DST): UTC+2 (CEST)
- Postal code: 32-002
- Area code: +48 12
- Car plates: KWI

Grabie [ˈɡrabjɛ] is a village in Poland located in Lesser Poland Voivodeship, in Wieliczka County, in Gmina Wieliczka.
