= Sygneczów =

- Village
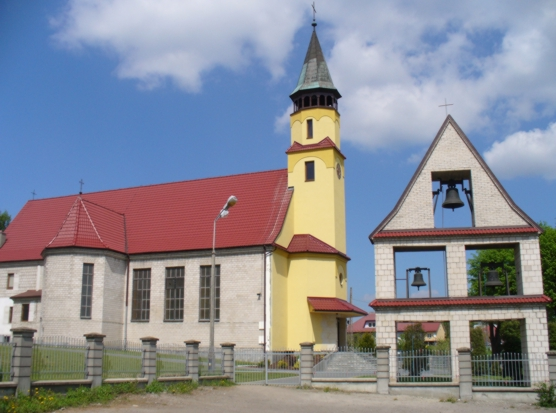
- Catholic church

- Location within Poland
- Coordinates: 49°58′N 20°1′E
- Country: Poland
- Voivodeship: Lesser Poland
- County: Wieliczka
- Gmina: Wieliczka

Sygneczów [sɨɡˈnɛt͡ʂuf] is a village in the administrative district of Gmina Wieliczka, within Wieliczka County, Lesser Poland Voivodeship, in southern Poland.
