= Sułków, Lesser Poland Voivodeship =

Sułków
- Village
- Location within Poland
- Coordinates: 49°59′20″N 20°5′55″E
- Country: Poland
- Voivodeship: Lesser Poland
- County: Wieliczka
- Gmina: Wieliczka
- Population: 1,000
- Website: www.sulkowianie.pl.tl

Sułków [ˈsuu̯kuf] is a village in the administrative district of Gmina Wieliczka, within Wieliczka County, Lesser Poland Voivodeship, in southern Poland.
