= Gmina Wieliczka =

Gmina Wieliczka Wieliczka Commune
- Gmina
- Coat of arms
- Interactive map of Gmina Wieliczka
- Coordinates (Wieliczka): 49°59′22″N 20°3′58″E
- Country: Poland
- Voivodeship: Lesser Poland
- County: Wieliczka
- Seat: Wieliczka

Area
  - Total: 100.1 km^{2} (38.6 sq mi)

Population (2023)
  - Total: 68,904
  - Density: 688.4/km^{2} (1,783/sq mi)
  - Urban: 27,845
  - Rural: 41,059
- Website: http://www.wieliczka.gmina.com/

Gmina Wieliczka is an urban-rural gmina (administrative district) in Wieliczka County, Lesser Poland Voivodeship, in southern Poland. Its seat is the town of Wieliczka, which lies approximately 13 kilometres (8 mi) south-east of the regional capital Kraków.

The gmina covers an area of 100.1 square kilometres (38.6 sq mi), and as of 2023, its total population is 68,904 (out of which the population of Wieliczka amounts to 27,845, and the population of the rural part of the gmina is 41,059).

== Villages ==
Apart from the town of Wieliczka, Gmina Wieliczka contains the villages and settlements of Brzegi, Byszyce, Chorągwica, Czarnochowice, Dobranowice, Golkowice, Gorzków, Grabie, Grabówki, Grajów, Jankówka, Janowice, Kokotów, Koźmice Małe, Koźmice Wielkie, Lednica Górna, Mała Wieś, Mietniów, Pawlikowice, Podstolice, Raciborsko, Rożnowa, Siercza, Śledziejowice, Strumiany, Sułków, Sygneczów, Węgrzce Wielkie and Zabawa.

== Neighbouring gminas ==
Gmina Wieliczka is bordered by the city of Kraków and by the gminas of Biskupice, Dobczyce, Gdów, Niepołomice, Siepraw and Świątniki Górne.
