= Brzegi, Wieliczka County =

Brzegi
- Village
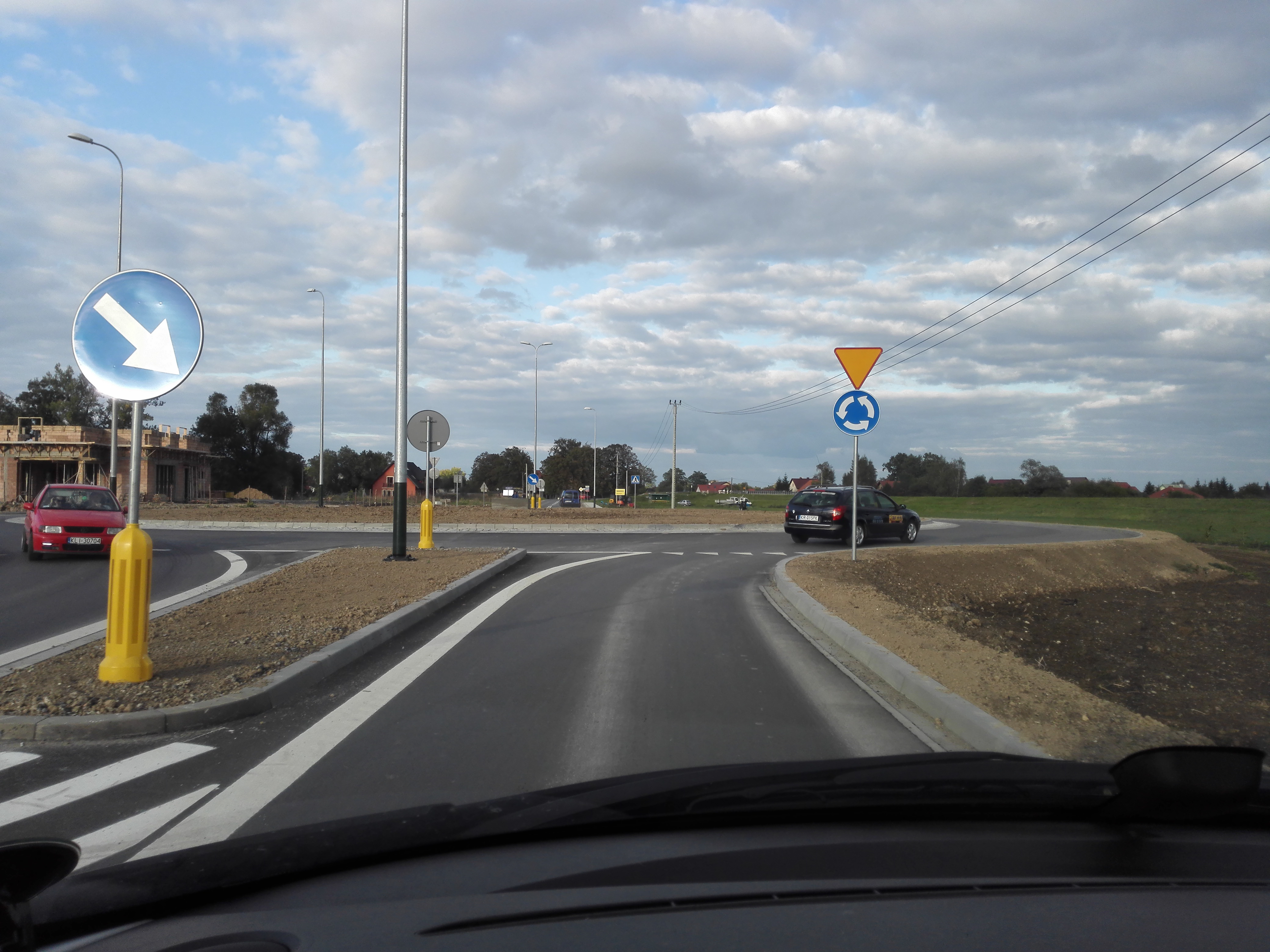

- Location within Poland
- Coordinates: 50°2′N 20°6′E
- Country: Poland
- Voivodeship: Lesser Poland
- County: Wieliczka
- Gmina: Wieliczka
- Website: www.brzegi.info

Brzegi [ˈbʐɛɡi] is a village in the administrative district of Gmina Wieliczka, within Wieliczka County, Lesser Poland Voivodeship, in southern Poland.
