= Kokotów =

- Village
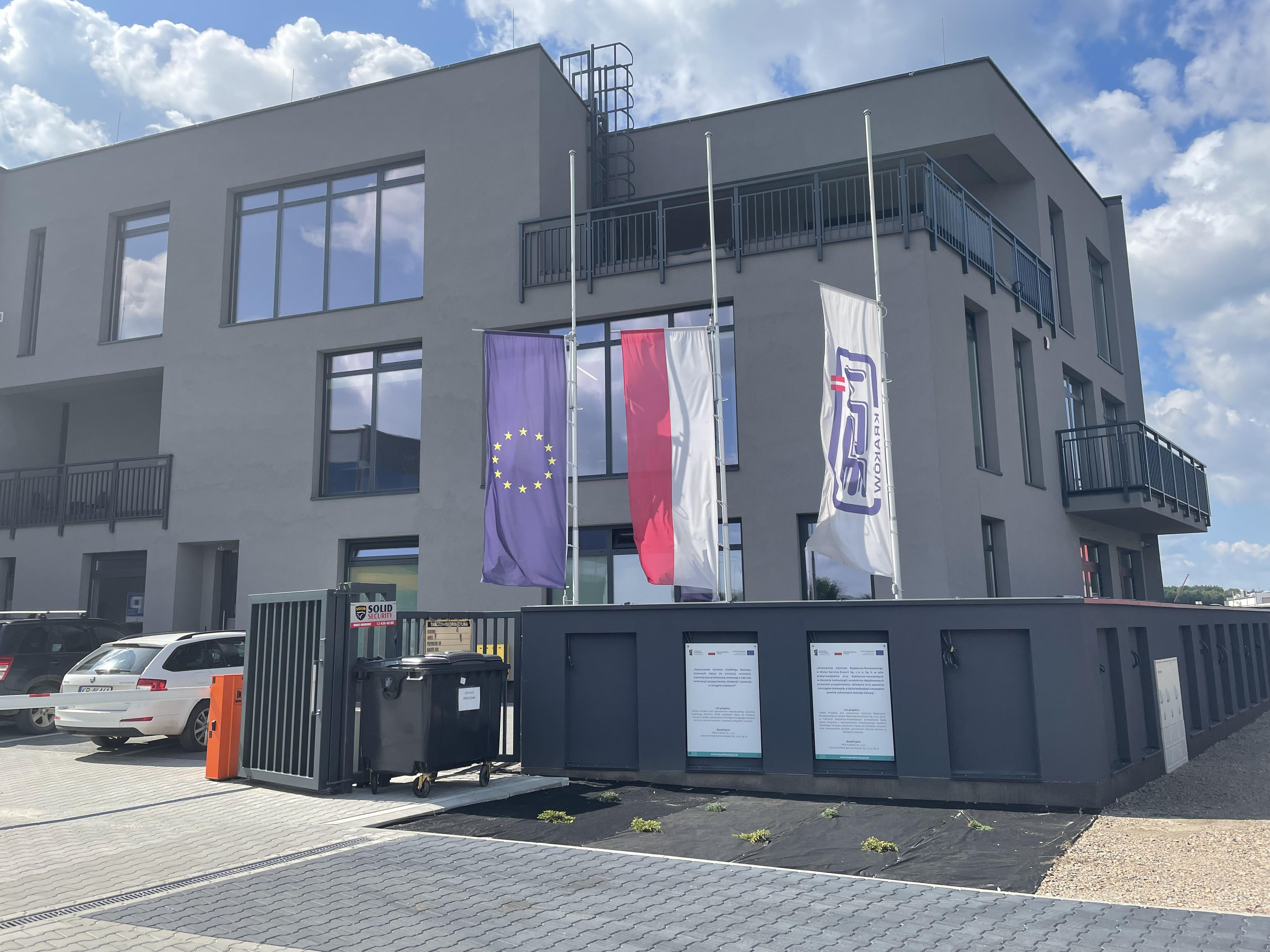

- Location within Poland
- Coordinates: 50°00′46″N 20°04′55.7″E
- Country: Poland
- Voivodeship: Lesser Poland
- County: Wieliczka
- Gmina: Wieliczka
- Population: 1,367

Kokotów [kɔˈkɔtuf] is a village in the administrative district of Gmina Wieliczka, within Wieliczka County, Lesser Poland Voivodeship, in southern Poland.
