= Golkowice, Lesser Poland Voivodeship =

Golkowice
- Village
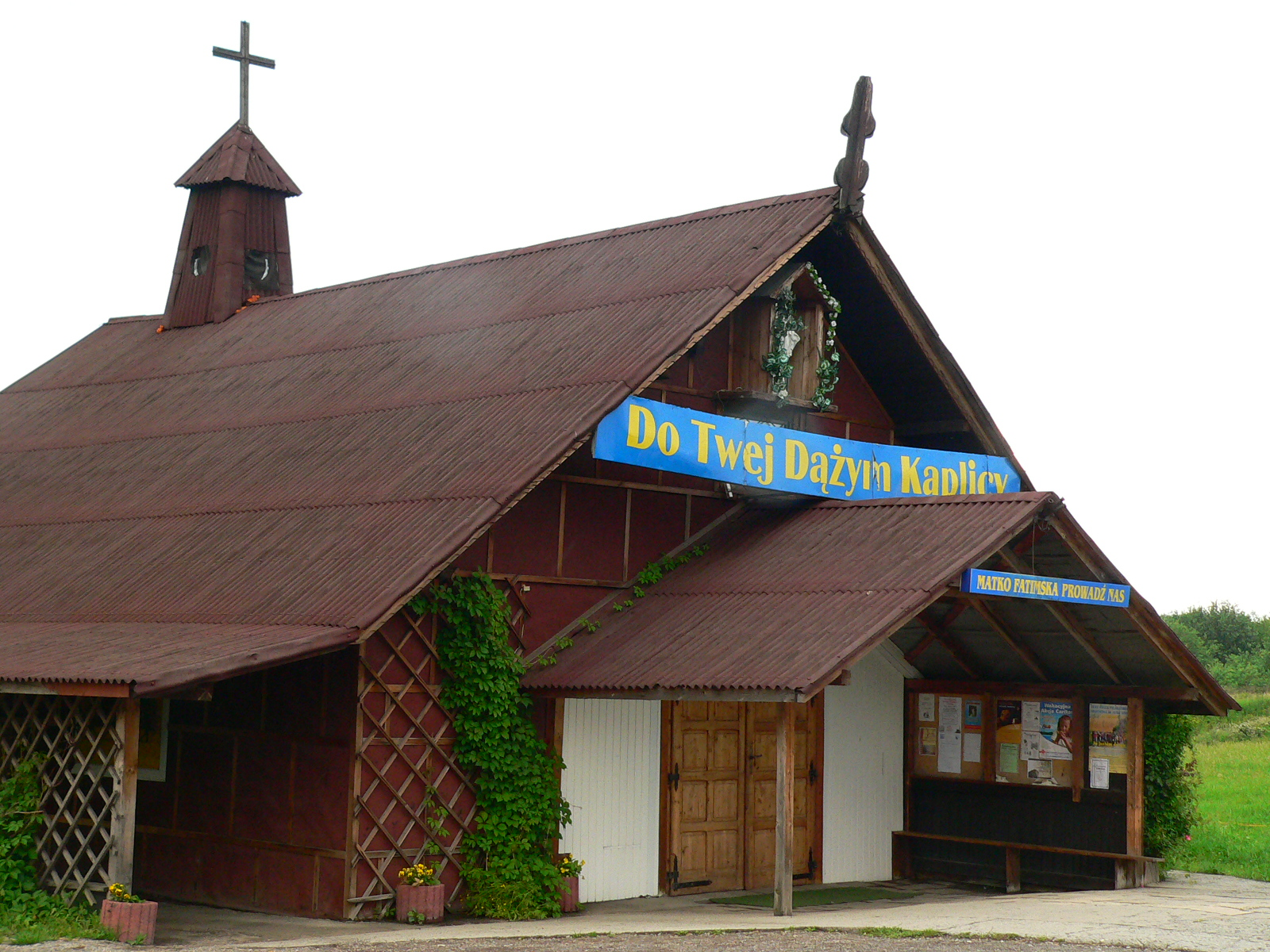
- Our Lady of Fatima Chapel

- Location within Poland
- Coordinates: 49°58′N 19°58′E
- Country: Poland
- Voivodeship: Lesser Poland
- County: Wieliczka
- Gmina: Wieliczka
- Population: 1,800

Golkowice [ɡɔlkɔˈvit͡sɛ] is a village in the administrative district of Gmina Wieliczka, within Wieliczka County, Lesser Poland Voivodeship, in southern Poland.
