= Strumiany, Lesser Poland Voivodeship =

Strumiany
- Village
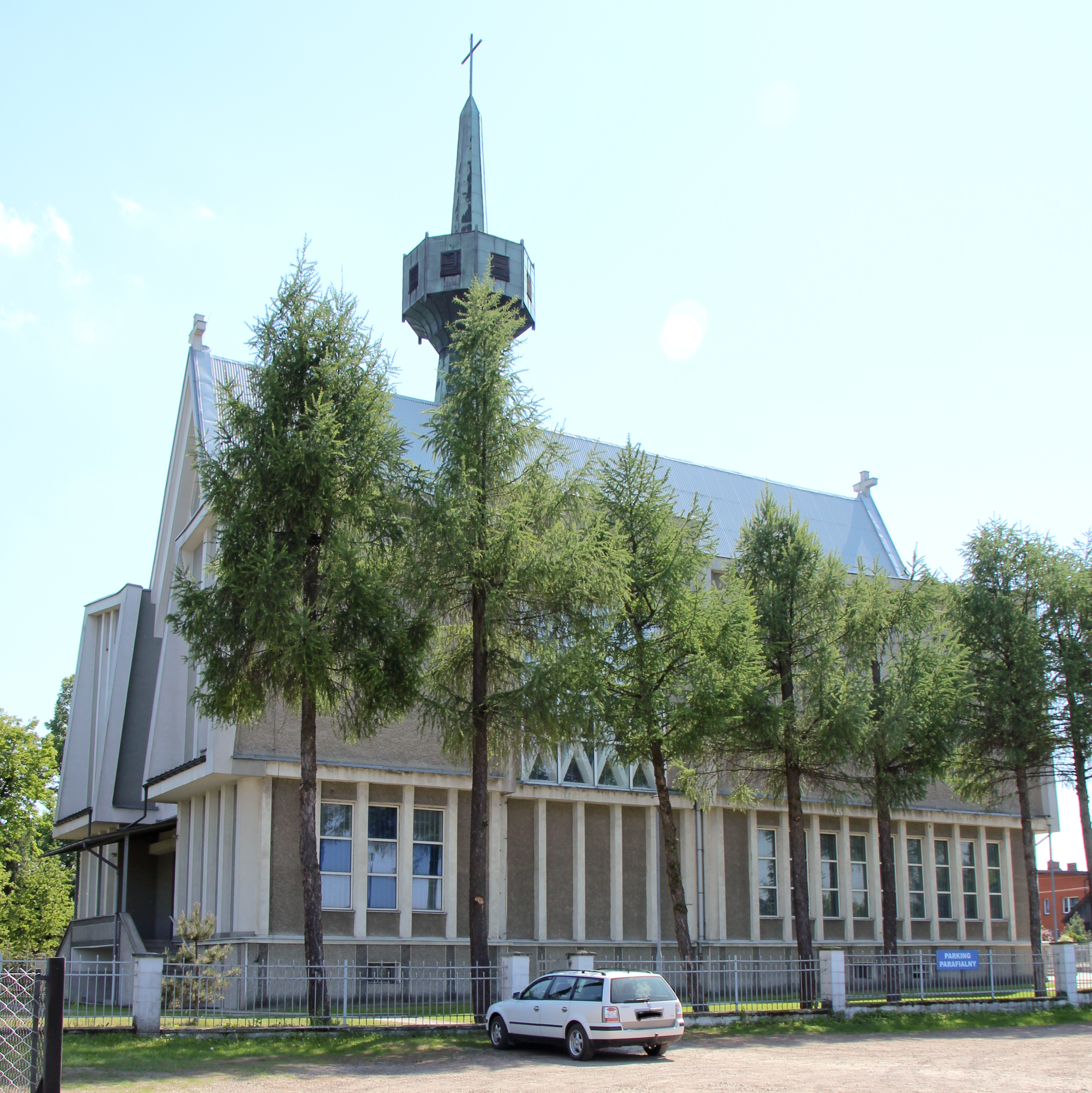
- Church

- Location within Poland
- Coordinates: 50°00′44″N 20°06′13″E
- Country: Poland
- Voivodeship: Lesser Poland
- County: Wieliczka
- Gmina: Wieliczka

Strumiany [struˈmjanɨ] is a village in the administrative district of Gmina Wieliczka, within Wieliczka County, Lesser Poland Voivodeship, in southern Poland.
