= Pawlikowice, Lesser Poland Voivodeship =

Pawlikowice
- Village
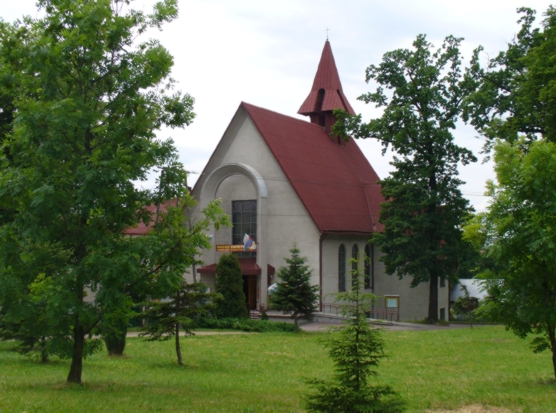
- Church of Saint Michael

- Location within Poland
- Coordinates: 49°55′N 20°5′E
- Country: Poland
- Voivodeship: Lesser Poland
- County: Wieliczka
- Gmina: Wieliczka

Population
  - Total: 1,200
- Website: http://www.pawlikowice.info

Pawlikowice [pavlikɔˈvit͡sɛ] is a village in the administrative district of Gmina Wieliczka, within Wieliczka County, Lesser Poland Voivodeship, in southern Poland.
