= Czarnochowice =

- Village
- Location within Poland
- Coordinates: 50°0′N 20°4′E
- Country: Poland
- Voivodeship: Lesser Poland
- County: Wieliczka
- Gmina: Wieliczka

Czarnochowice [t͡ʂarnɔxɔˈvit͡sɛ] is a village in the administrative district of Gmina Wieliczka, within Wieliczka County, Lesser Poland Voivodeship, in southern Poland.
