= Grabówki, Lesser Poland Voivodeship =

Grabówki
- Village
- Location within Poland
- Coordinates: 49°58′23″N 20°1′42″E
- Country: Poland
- Voivodeship: Lesser Poland
- County: Wieliczka
- Gmina: Wieliczka

Grabówki [ɡraˈbufki] is a village in the administrative district of Gmina Wieliczka, within Wieliczka County, Lesser Poland Voivodeship, in southern Poland.
