= Węgrzce Wielkie =

- Village
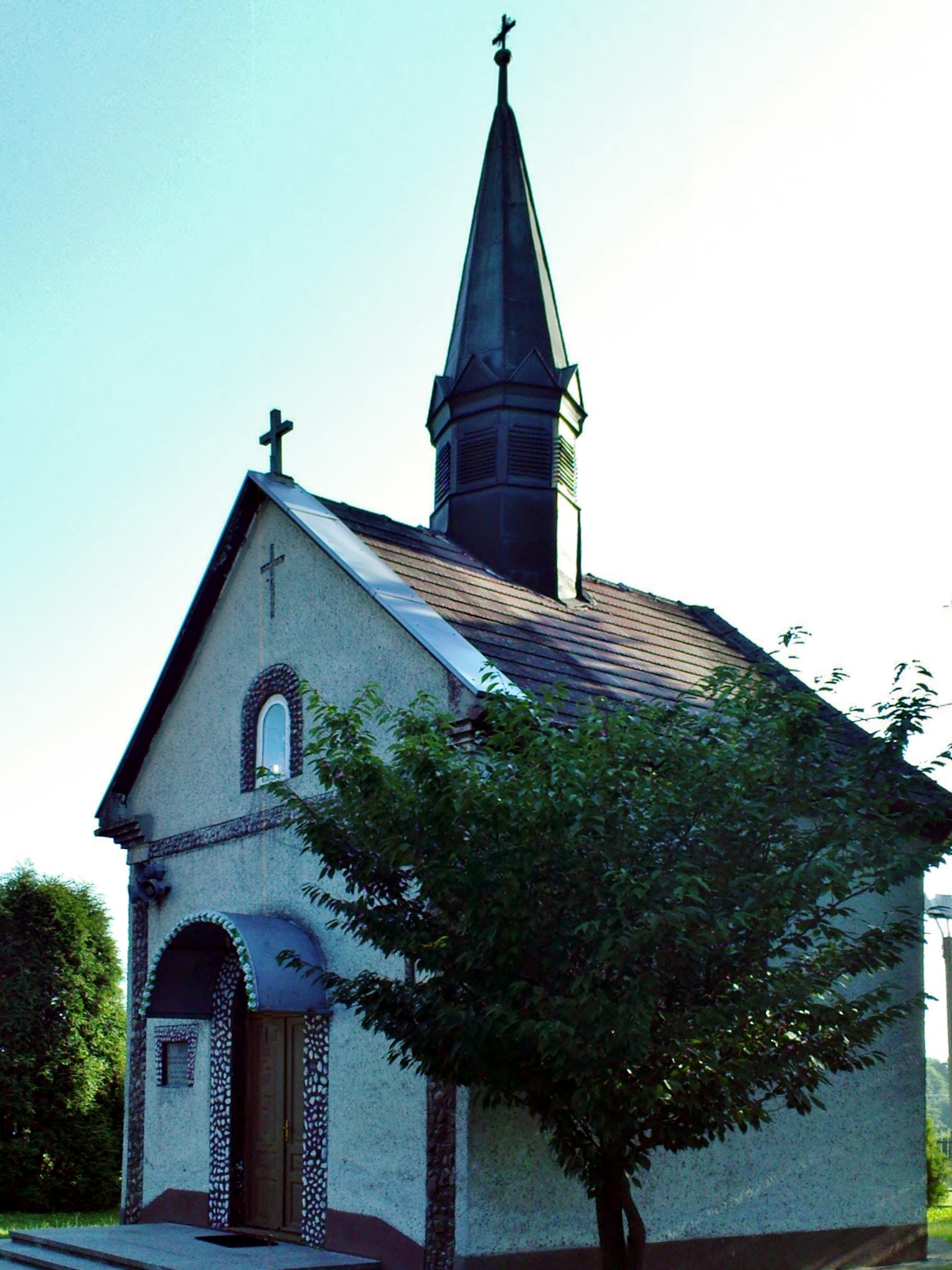
- Węgrzce Wielkie chapel

- Location within Poland
- Coordinates: 50°1′N 20°7′E
- Country: Poland
- Voivodeship: Lesser Poland
- County: Wieliczka
- Gmina: Wieliczka
- Website: http://wegrzcewielkie.pl

Węgrzce Wielkie [ˈvɛŋkʂt͡sɛ ˈvjɛlkʲɛ] is a village in the administrative district of Gmina Wieliczka, within Wieliczka County, Lesser Poland Voivodeship, in southern Poland.
