= Koźmice Małe =

- Village
- Location within Poland
- Coordinates: 49°55′N 20°4′E
- Country: Poland
- Voivodeship: Lesser Poland
- County: Wieliczka
- Gmina: Wieliczka
- Population: 518
- Website: http://www.kozmice.pl/

Koźmice Małe [kɔʑˈmit͡sɛ ˈmawɛ] is a village in the administrative district of Gmina Wieliczka, in Wieliczka County, Lesser Poland Voivodeship, in southern Poland.
