= Śledziejowice =

- Village
- Location within Poland
- Coordinates: 50°1′N 20°5′E
- Country: Poland
- Voivodeship: Lesser Poland
- County: Wieliczka
- Gmina: Wieliczka

Śledziejowice [ɕlɛd͡ʑɛjɔˈvit͡sɛ] is a village in the administrative district of Gmina Wieliczka, within Wieliczka County, Lesser Poland Voivodeship, in southern Poland.
