= Byszyce =

- Village
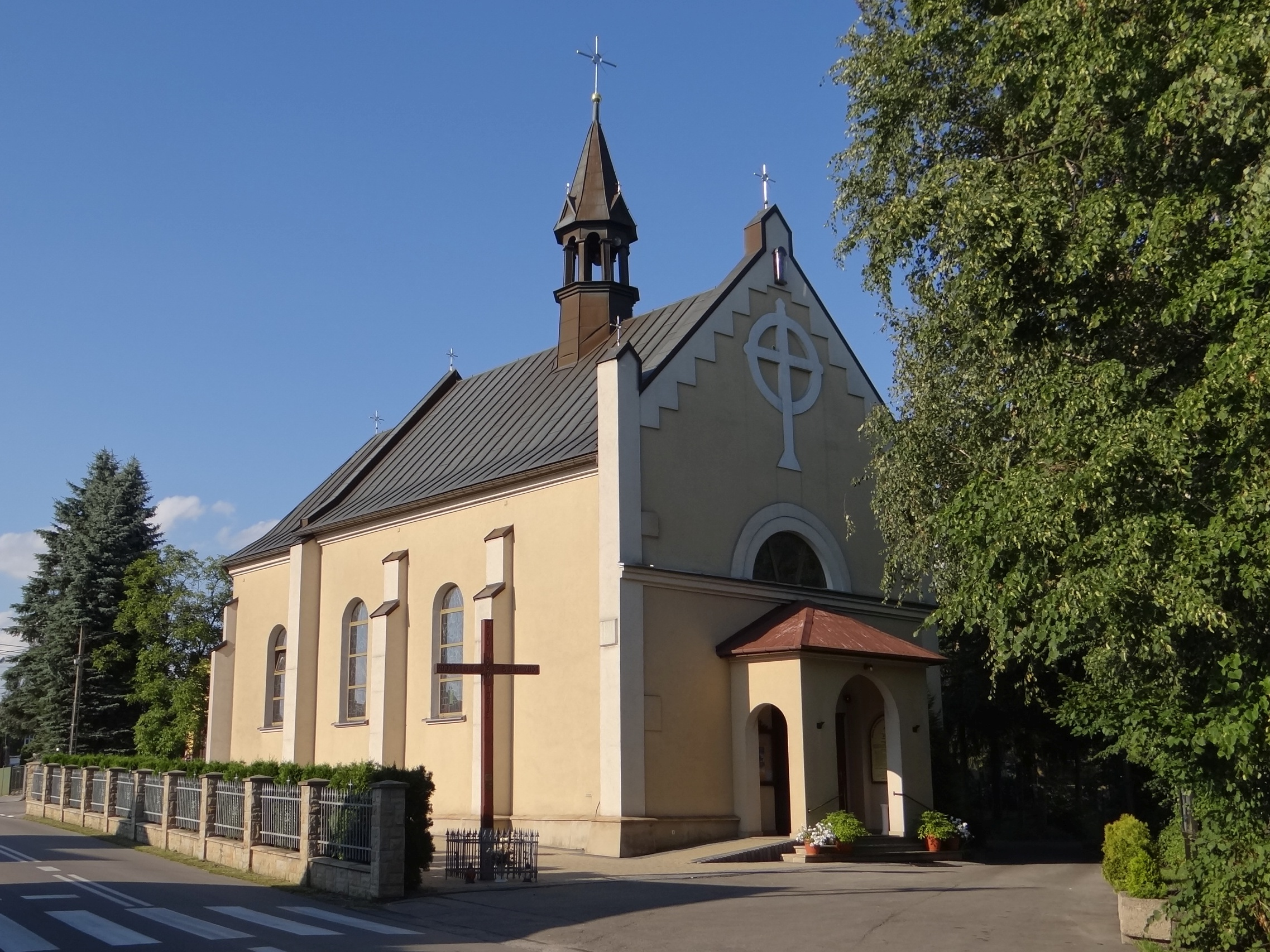
- Catholic church

- Location within Poland
- Coordinates: 49°56′N 20°1′E
- Country: Poland
- Voivodeship: Lesser Poland
- County: Wieliczka
- Gmina: Wieliczka

Byszyce [bɨˈʂɨt͡sɛ] is a village in the administrative district of Gmina Wieliczka, within Wieliczka County, Lesser Poland Voivodeship, in southern Poland.
