= Franz Baader (ice hockey) =

Franz Baader was a German referee and linesman. He is a member of the German Ice Hockey Hall of Fame. He was the referee during Game 6 of the 1972 Summit Series, played between Canada and the Soviet Union.

During the same Series, Baader was embroiled in some controversy, because of the choice of officials for Game 8. The original referees chosen were the Swedish referee Ove Dahlberg and Czechoslovak referee Rudolf Baťa. However, Dahlberg had fallen ill with a suspected case of food poisoning. The Soviet Union decided to switch the referees Josef Kompalla (also from Germany) and Franz Baader, on the eve of the game 8.

Alan Eagleson, a key organizer from Canada of the Series had threatened to depart from Moscow, where the game was being played. He had reached an agreement with the Canadian team about the possible departure. However, an agreement was reached, with Kompalla and Baťa being the referees for Game 8.

Baader is considered a rather infamous referee; he is considered having made many poor calls in Game 6. In fact, many sources consider Baader one of "the pair they (Canadian team) hated most", and a "horrendous official".
