= Gorzków, Wieliczka County =

Gorzków
- Village
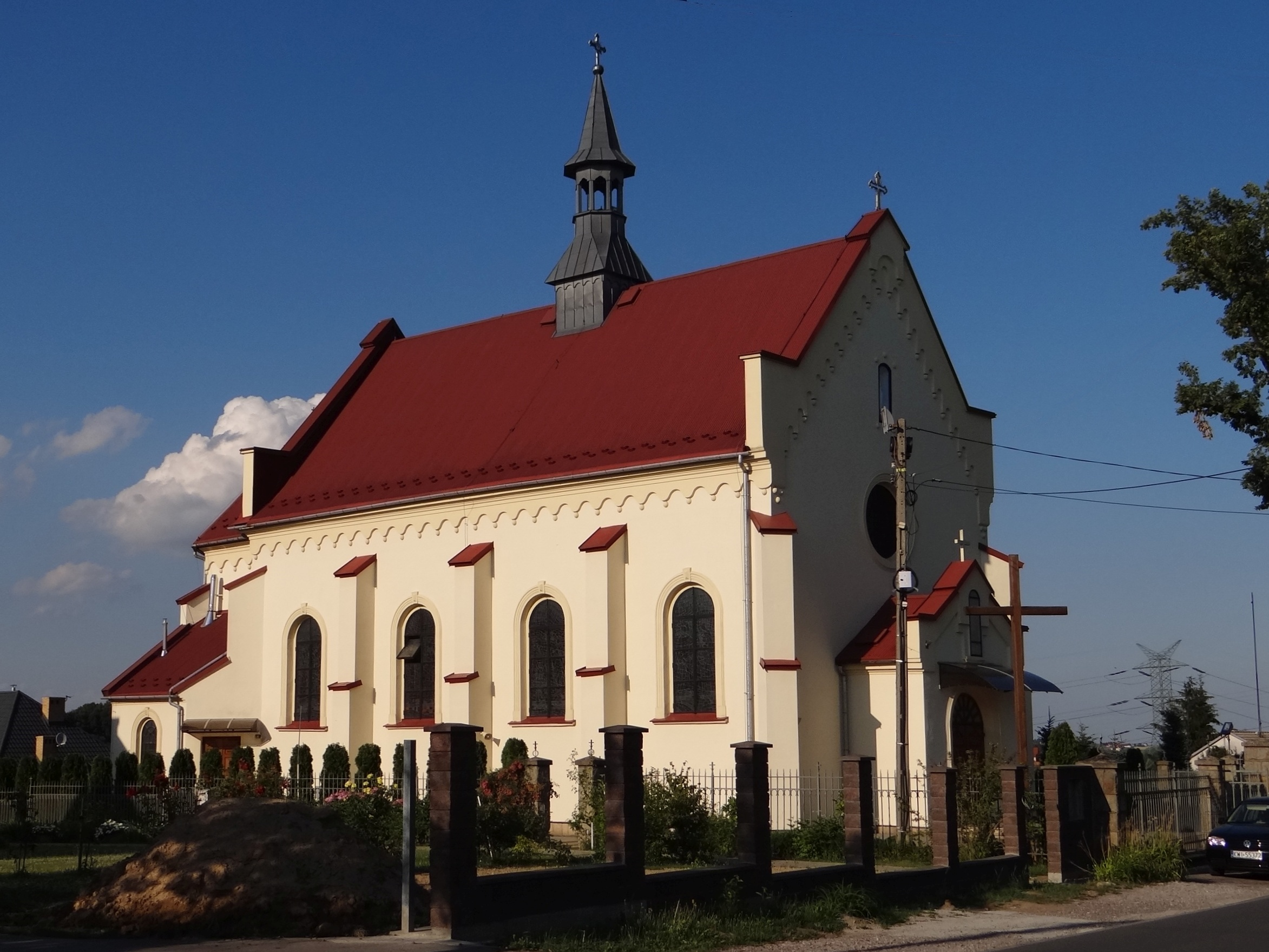
- Catholic church

- Location within Poland
- Coordinates: 49°55′N 20°2′E
- Country: Poland
- Voivodeship: Lesser Poland
- County: Wieliczka
- Gmina: Wieliczka
- Population: 872

Gorzków [ˈɡɔʂkuf] is a village in the administrative district of Gmina Wieliczka, within Wieliczka County, Lesser Poland Voivodeship, in southern Poland.
