= Podstolice, Lesser Poland Voivodeship =

Podstolice
- Village
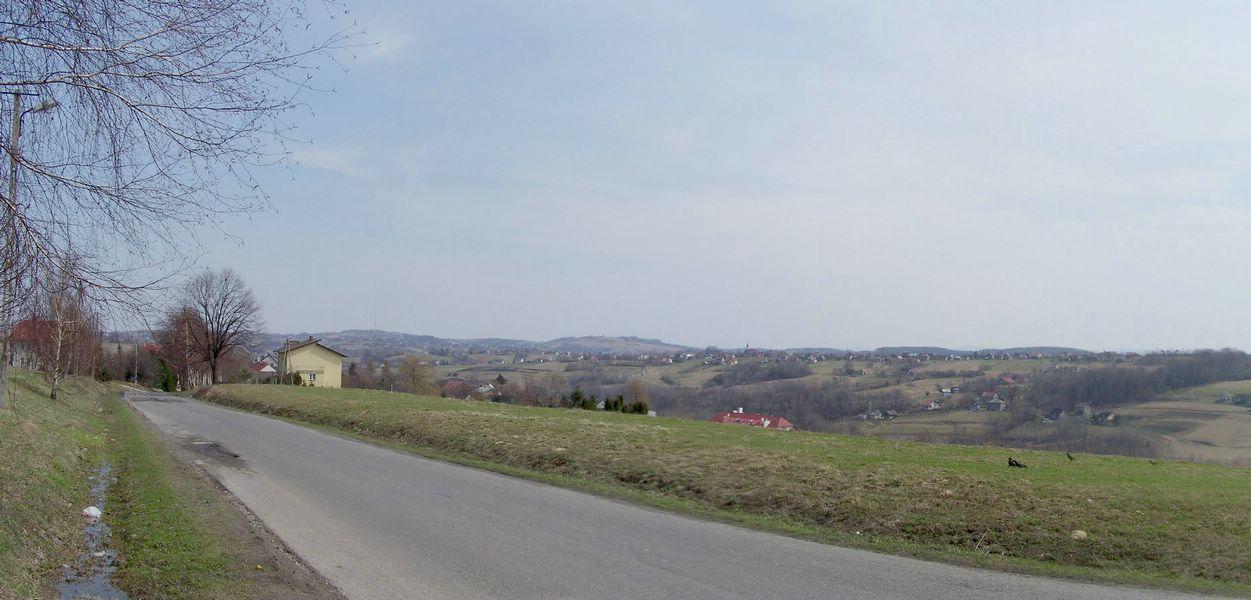

- Location within Poland
- Coordinates: 49°57′0″N 20°0′0″E
- Country: Poland
- Voivodeship: Lesser Poland
- County: Wieliczka
- Gmina: Wieliczka
- Elevation: 342 m (1,122 ft)
- Population: 980

Podstolice [pɔtstɔˈlit͡sɛ] is a village in the administrative district of Gmina Wieliczka, within Wieliczka County, Lesser Poland Voivodeship, in southern Poland.
