= Zabawa, Wieliczka County =

Zabawa
- Village
- Location within Poland
- Coordinates: 49°59′38″N 20°5′23″E
- Country: Poland
- Voivodeship: Lesser Poland
- County: Wieliczka
- Gmina: Wieliczka
- Population: 812

Zabawa [zaˈbava] (translation: fun) is a village in the administrative district of Gmina Wieliczka, within Wieliczka County, Lesser Poland Voivodeship, in southern Poland.
