= Ove Dahlberg =

- Born: 12 April 1931; Surahammar, Sweden
- Died: 9 January 1997 (aged 65)
- Known for: IIHF official
- Honors: IIHF Hall of Fame (2004)
Ice hockey career
- National team: Sweden
- Playing career: 1947–1961

Ove Dahlberg (12 April 1931 – 9 January 1997) was a Swedish ice hockey and soccer official. Having previously played a forward position in ice hockey, Dahlberg is considered one of the greatest European referees for his ability to read the game. He was inducted posthumously into the IIHF Hall of Fame in 2004 and into the Swedish Ice Hockey Hall of Fame in 2012.

== Career ==
Dahlberg was born on 12 April 1931 in Surahammar, Sweden. He grew up as childhood friends with Ronald Pettersson, who also played hockey and was eventually inducted into the Hockey Hall of Fame.

Dahlberg played ice hockey before beginning his refereeing career. He began as a forward before transitioning to defence. He played for Surahammars IF in the then-highest Swedish league Hockeyettan before making his Sweden national ice hockey team debut in 1954. He made his international debut at the 1962 Ice Hockey World Championships.

In the 1960s, he was hired by the International Ice Hockey Federation (IIHF) to serve as a referee. Due to his reputation as a fair judge, Dahlberg was often selected to referee contentious matches. He was chosen to officiate at the 1968 Winter Olympics and 1969 World Ice Hockey Championships.

Dahlberg's reputation with the IIHF carried forward with him into the 1970s and across the world. As a result, his name was suggested as a suitable candidate to referee the Canada and Soviet Union Summit Series in 1972. He judged two games in the series and subsequent games forced a game eight tie breaker between Canada and the Soviets. Team Canada refused to allow two previous referees, both from West Germany, to officiate the tie-breaking match due to a perceived bias they held against Canada. While the Soviets insisted on using the two West German referees, Team Canada preferred Dahlberg and Rudolph Batja and threatened to pull out of the series unless Dahlberg and Batja were selected as the officials. Although it was originally agreed upon that both Dahlberg and Batja would officiate, the Soviets backed out of the agreement after Dahlberg was diagnosed with the flu. As a compromise, Josef Kompalla and Batja officiated the match, which ended with Canada winning the title.

Later in his career, he judged further contentious matches such as the United States and Soviet Union exhibition games prior to the 1976 Canada Cup which drew 29 penalties. Besides refereeing ice hockey matches, Dahlberg also officiated soccer matches, including the qualifying rounds for the FIFA World Cup.

Dahlberg retired as a referee in 1981, and died in his sleep from a heart attack on 9 January 1997.

He was inducted posthumously into the IIHF Hall of Fame in 2004, and into the Swedish Hockey Hall of Fame in 2012.

== Career statistics ==
			Regular season					Playoffs
Season	Team	League	GP	G	A	Pts	PIM	GP	G	A	Pts	PIM
1947–48	Surahammars IF	Division 2	4	1	0	1	–	2	0	–	0	–
1948–49	Surahammars IF	Division 1	9	2	0	2	2	—	–	—	—	—
1949–50	Surahammars IF	Division 2	7	10	0	10	0	—	—	—	—	—
1950–51	Västerås IK	Division 1	10	3	–	3	0	—	—	—	—	–
1951–52	Surahammars IF	Division 2	9	3	0	3	0	—	—	—	—	—
1952–53	Surahammars IF	Division 1	10	3	0	3	2	—	—	—	—	—
1953–54	Surahammars IF	Division 1	10	0	0	0	2	—	—	—	—	—
1954–55	Surahammars IF	Division 2	8	8	0	8	0	2	0	0	0	0
1955–56	Surahammars IF	Division 1	9	2	0	2	0	—	—	—	—	—
1956–57	Surahammars IF	Division 2	12	4	0	4	2	6	4	0	4	4
1957–58	Surahammars IF	Division 1	14	0	0	0	0	—	—	—	—	—
1958–59	Surahammars IF	Division 2	7	1	0	1	0	—	—	—	—	—
1959–60	Surahammars IF	Division 3	8	11	0	11	0	4	2	—	2	0
1960–61	Surahammars IF	Division 2	5	2	0	2	4	—	—	—	—	—

=== International ===
Year	Team	Event	Result	GP	G	A	Pts	PIM
1962	Sweden	WC	1st place, gold medalist(s)	2	0	–	0	–
Senior totals				2	0	–	2	–
