= Mietniów =

- Village
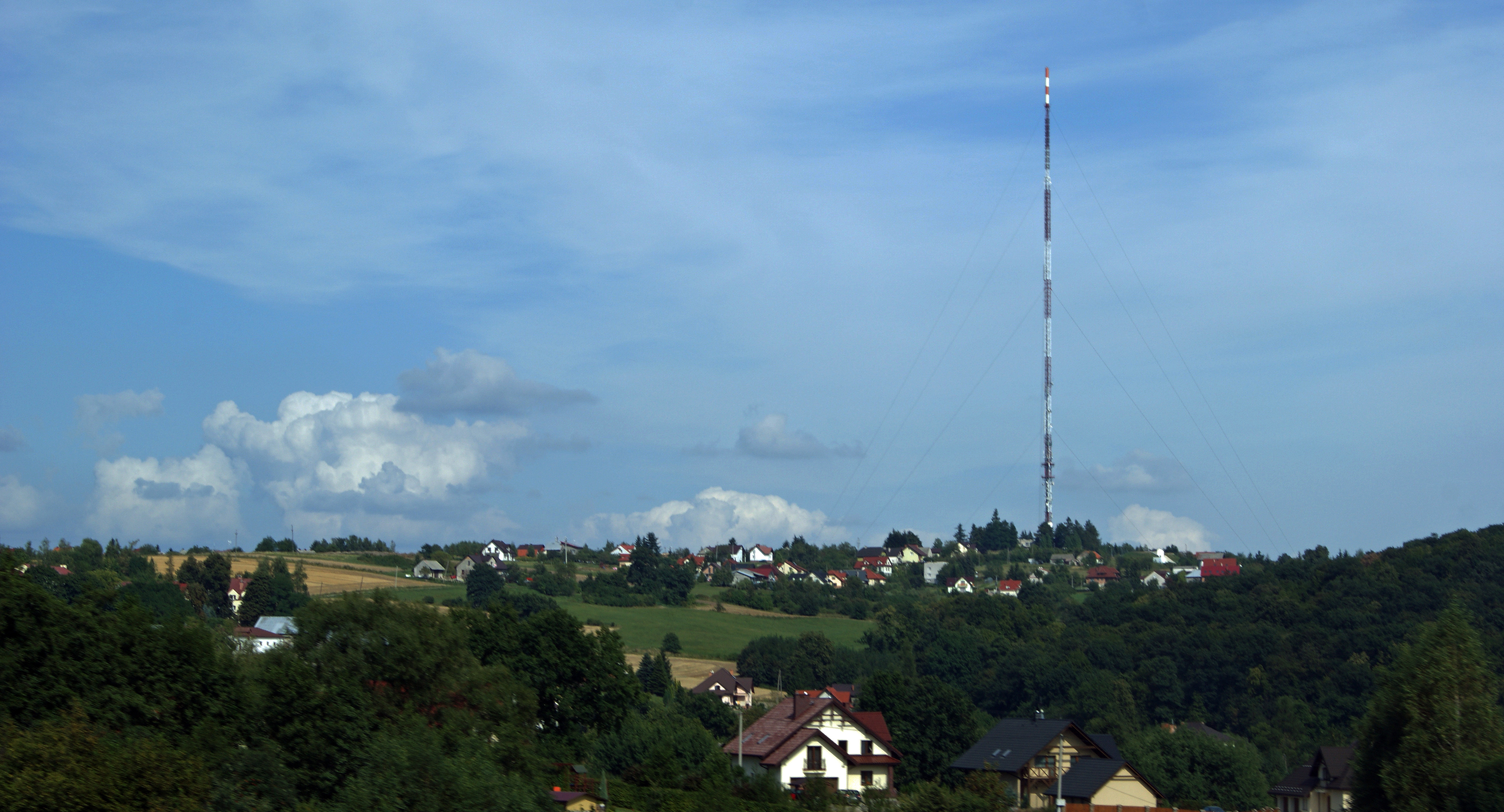

- Location within Poland
- Coordinates: 49°57′19″N 20°4′41″E
- Country: Poland
- Voivodeship: Lesser Poland
- County: Wieliczka
- Gmina: Wieliczka

Mietniów [ˈmjɛtɲuf] is a village in the administrative district of Gmina Wieliczka, within Wieliczka County, Lesser Poland Voivodeship, in southern Poland.
