= Koźmice Wielkie =

- Village
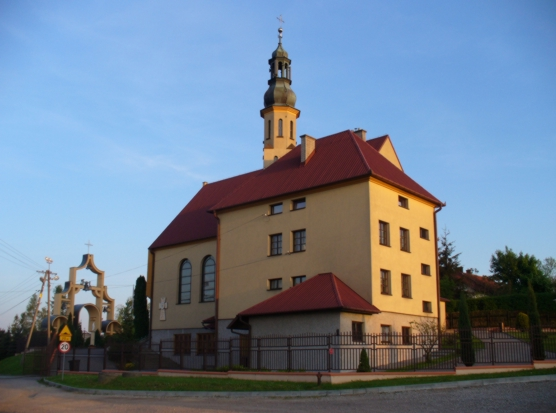
- Holy Trinity church in Koźmice Wielkie

- Location within Poland
- Coordinates: 49°56′50″N 20°2′5″E
- Country: Poland
- Voivodeship: Lesser Poland
- County: Wieliczka
- Gmina: Wieliczka

Population
  - Total: 2,522
- Time zone: UTC+1 (CET)
  - Summer (DST): UTC+2 (CEST)
- Vehicle registration: KWI
- Website: http://www.kozmice.wieliczka.eu

Koźmice Wielkie [kɔʑˈmit͡sɛ ˈvjɛlkʲɛ] is a village in the administrative district of Gmina Wieliczka, within Wieliczka County, Lesser Poland Voivodeship, in southern Poland.

== History ==
By 1883, Koźmice Wielkie had a population of 958.

During the German invasion of Poland, which started World War II, on September 12, 1939, the German Sicherheitspolizei carried out a massacre of 32 Jews in the village.
