= Josef Kompalla =

German ice hockey referee (1936–2026)

Josef Kompalla

Josef Kompalla (Polish: Józef Kompała; 13 March 1936 – 12 July 2026) was a Polish-German ice hockey player and referee. He officiated for the International Ice Hockey Federation, and the Summit Series between the Soviet Union and Canada. Kompalla received the Order of Merit of the Federal Republic of Germany in 1992, and was inducted into the IIHF Hall of Fame in 2003.

== Biography ==
Kompalla was born in Katowice on 13 March 1936. He began his ice hockey career as a player with Gwardia Katowice in 1951. Playing as a defender, he won three Polish junior championships with Gwardia before joining the stronger senior team of Górnik Katowice in 1956 and consequently became Polish champion in his final season in 1958. Together with several other Polish-born players, he then emigrated to West Germany and joined Preussen Krefeld in the German Eishockey-Bundesliga. He also played a few international games for both Poland and Germany at "B" level.

Already before his retirement as a player, Kompalla attended a refereeing course in 1969 and subsequently abandoned his playing career joining the German Ice Hockey Federation as an official in 1970. In 1972, Kompalla was selected by the International Ice Hockey Federation to officiate at the 1972 World Ice Hockey Championships, including both games between eventual gold and silver medalists Czechoslovakia and the Soviet Union. That same year, he was also selected to officiate the Summit Series between the Soviet Union and Canada. His officiating partner during this series was Franz Baader. Both Kompalla and Baader received criticism from Team Canada during the series, which resulted in Kompalla pairing up with Rudolf Baťa for the final game. During the final game, he called a penalty against Canadian J. P. Parisé who responded by angrily swinging his stick in a threatening gesture at Kompalla. This resulted in a game misconduct for Parise, although Team Canada still won the series securing also Kompalla a memorable place in Canadian sports history and folklore. He also refereed the 1974 Summit Series.

Over his long refereeing career he officiated some 2000 German league games as well as 157 international games including at three Winter Olympic Games (1976, 1980, 1984) and twelve IIHF World Championship tournaments (Group A: 1972, 1974, 1975, 1977, 1978, 1981, 1982, 1985, 1986, Group B: 1973, 1982, 1983). He ended his active career at the 1992 Deutschland Cup and subsequently served at the IIHF Referee Committee until 1998. Kompalla remained active as a referee supervisor. For his achievements he received the German Federal Cross of Merit in 1992 and was inducted into the IIHF Hall of Fame in 2003.

His daughter Nicole Kompalla made career as a German league referee in the 1980s, as the only female referee in all of professional ice hockey at the time. Nicole married 2. Bundesliga top scorer Benoît Doucet in 1990. Doucet eventually represented Düsseldorfer EG whose fans were known as especially hostile towards Kompalla.

Kompalla died on 12 July 2026, at the age of 90.
