= Mass media in Poland =

The mass media in Poland consist of several different types of communications media including television, radio, cinema, newspapers, magazines, and Internet.

The media landscape is very pluralistic but highly polarized along political and ideological divides.

== The media landscape ==
According to the 2023 report by Warsaw-based media monitoring firm Instytut Monitorowania Mediów (IMM), the most quoted media outlet was RMF FM radio followed by Wirtualna Polska news portal, Rzeczpospolita daily, TVN24 news station and Radio Zet.

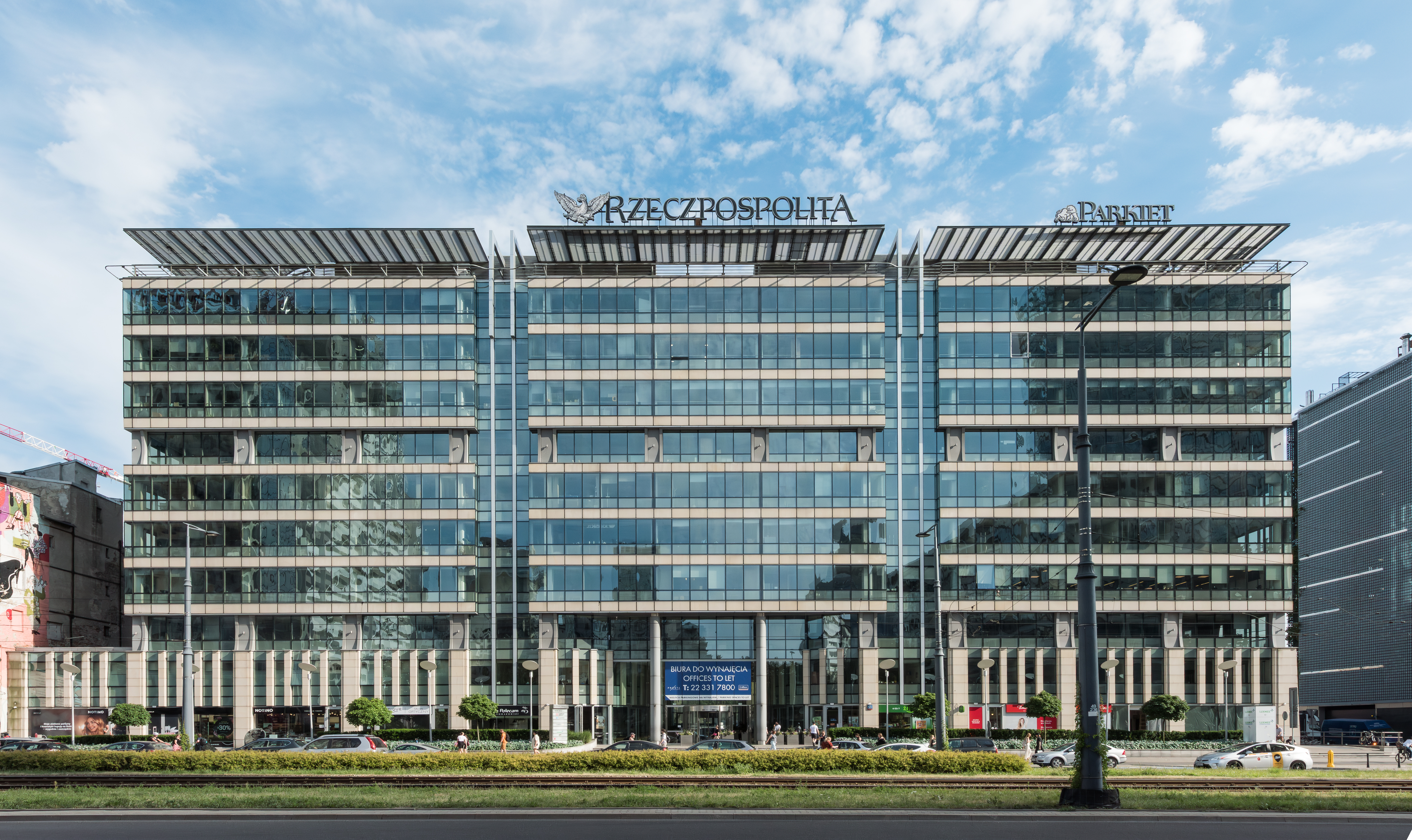
The Warsaw building of the Rzeczpospolita daily

The Internet penetration of Poland stands at around 92%. According to the Digital News Report by the Reuters Institute, the top 5 most popular online news outlets in 2023 were: Onet, Wirtualna Polska, TVN24.pl, Interia and RMF24.pl.

The government is working to increase broadband internet service. The major print, radio and television outlets have online editions. Online-only portals publishing a mix of news and entertainment content are among the country's most-visited websites .

The reach of television is widespread. In 2016, the Poles on average watched television for over 4 hours and 20 minutes a day. The public television broadcaster is Telewizja Polska (TVP), which runs two main channels, one regional channel and several thematic channels. The TVP is an important source of information for many Poles, in particular in small cities, though its popularity has been declining in recent years. In the private sector there are over 200 commercial TV broadcasters: the two leading one are Polsat and TVN.

Radio is a popular medium in Poland. In addition to the public radio broadcaster, Polskie Radio (PR), there are over 200 licensed private radio outlets.

== History and political landscape ==
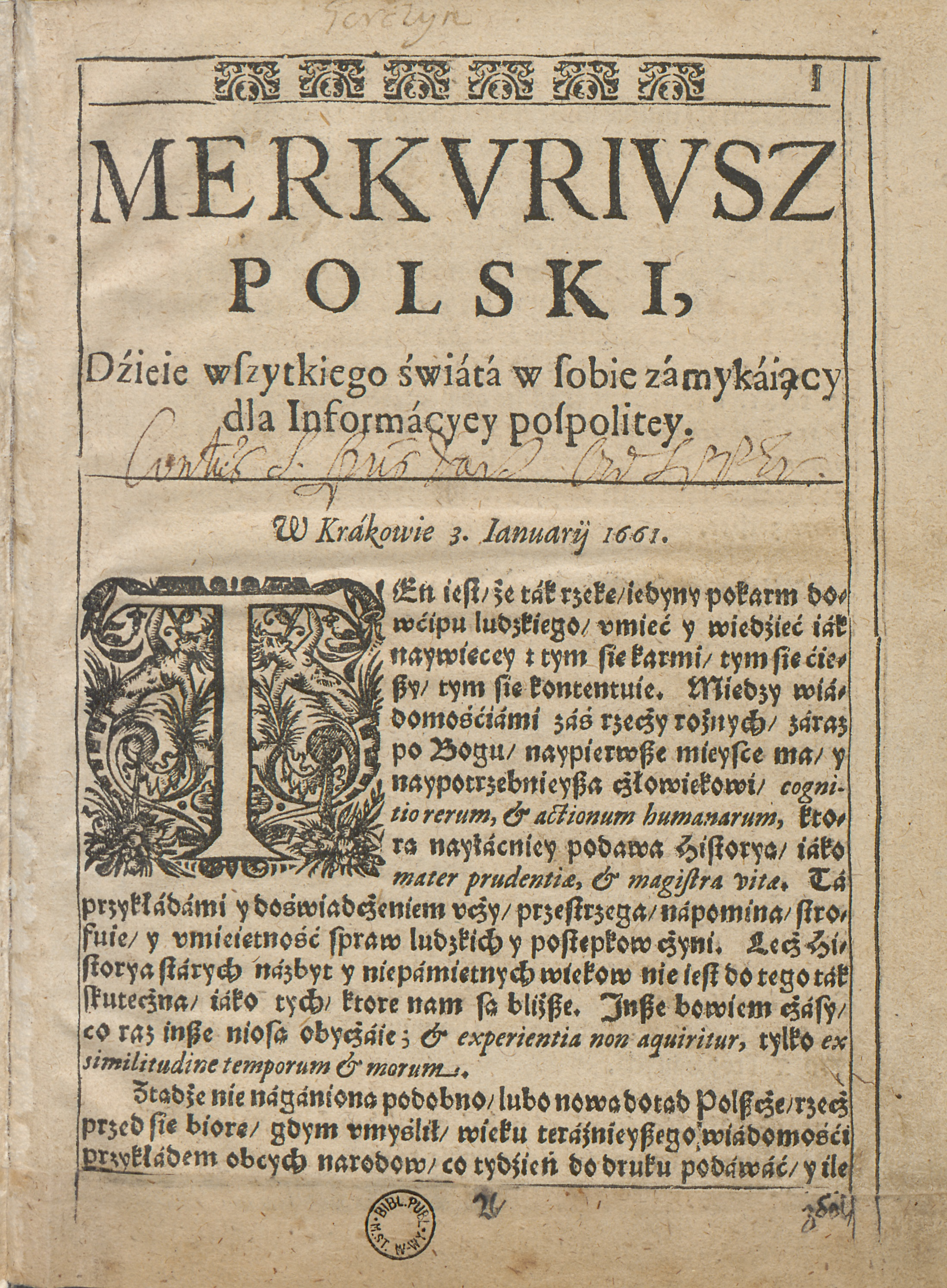
Merkuriusz Polski, 1661.

The oldest Polish newspaper was Merkuriusz Polski, first published in 1661. A number of other dailies were established during the First Polish Republic, including the Monitor and Gazeta Warszawska.

Public radio service and the first national news agency were both founded at the beginning of the 20th century. The first TV broadcaster, Telewizja Polska, launched in 1952.

During the Soviet-imposed communist regime the Stalinist press doctrine dominated and controlled the media. However the country instituted freedom of press since the fall of communism.

The main features of the media system of modern Poland are the product of the country's socio-political and economic post-communist transition. These features include: the privatisation of the press sector; the transformation of the state radio and television into public broadcasting services; influx of foreign capital into the media market and European integration of audiovisual media policies.

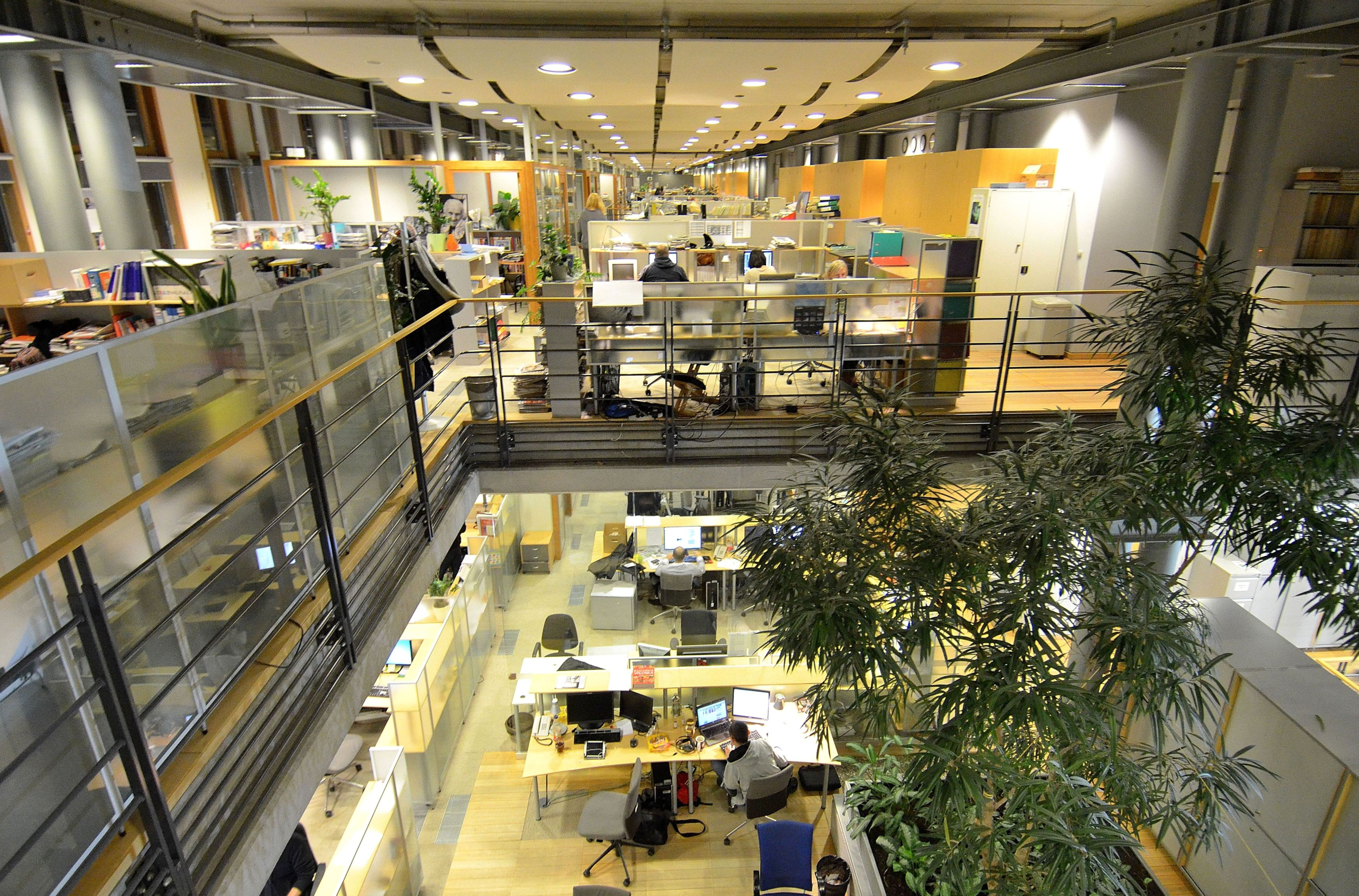
Gazeta Wyborcza editorial office, 2014

Since the 1990s, Poland has developed a pluralistic but highly polarized media environment. The media landscape comprises, in addition to the public radio and television broadcasters, a variety of private media outlets, encompassing a broad political spectrum, from socially liberal to ultraconservative. In the sector of print media, the newspaper with the largest circulation is Gazeta Wyborcza, founded in 1989. Its founding father was Adam Michnik- a Communist-era dissident. The daily had a critical stance towards the Law and Justice Party (PiS) government. The second largest paper is Rzeczpospolita, which has conservative traditions.

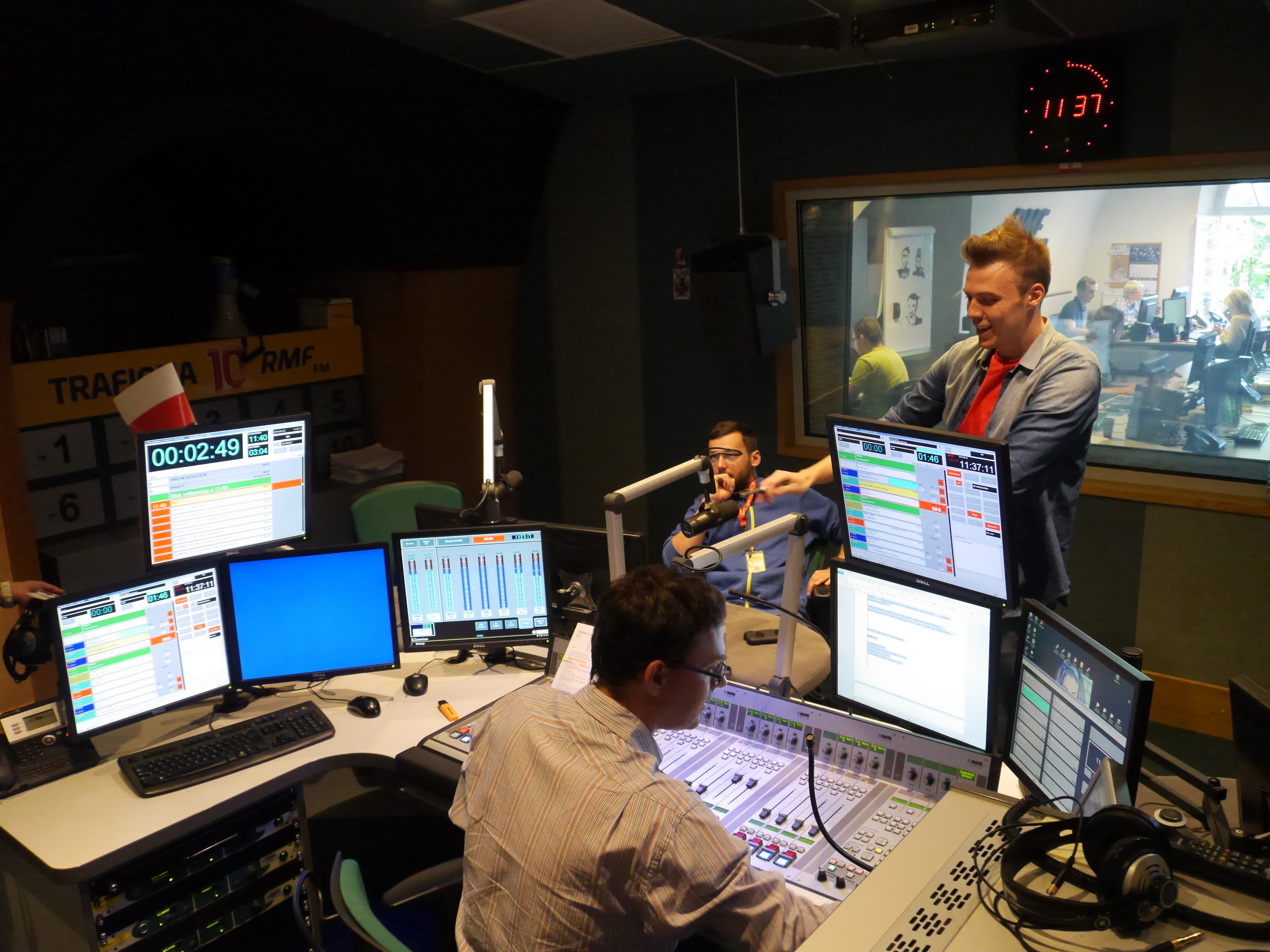
RMF FM studio and newsroom, Kraków

The two main business-oriented dailies are Dziennik Gazeta Prawna and Puls Biznesu: they both have a narrow, professional readership and are typically not engaged in the country’ political conflict. The two leading tabloids are Fakt, owned by the Swiss-German media conglomerate Axel Springer, and Super Express, owned by ZPR Media. These tabloids have a remarkable impact on public opinion.

In addition to national publications, there are several regional dailies: in this sector, the top competitors have sales comprised between 20,000 and 40,000 daily copies sold.

In the recent years, sales of both national and regional dailies have been declining.

Political polarization also characterizes the weekly newsmagazine market. On the liberal side there is Newsweek Polska (the Polish edition of the Newsweek), followed by Polityka. On the right side, there are newer titlesSieci, Do Rzeczy and the older Gazeta Polska. The right-wing weeklies do not form a uniform bloc.

== Legal framework ==
The Polish constitution of 1997 guarantees freedom of the press and prohibits both preventive censorship and licensing requirements for the press. The media sector is regulated by the 1984 Polish Press Law and the 1992 Broadcasting Act, which have both been amended since then. The Broadcasting Act defines the rules for appointing the members of the National Broadcasting Council (Krajowa Rada Radiofonii i Telewizji, KRRiT) and its powers. According to the Constitution, the KRRiT's role is to "safeguard the freedom of speech, the right to information, and the public interest in radio and television broadcasting".

Even though its members are not allowed to belong to political party or perform public activities, the KRRiT in practice has been politicized, with members somehow affiliated with political parties. Also the governments’ reform attempts of the KRRiT have been largely politically driven. These attempts have been strengthened by the right-wing Law and Justice Party (PiS) government which, after winning the parliamentary elections in October 2015, partly replaced the management at the public television and radio broadcasters.

== Media polarisation ==
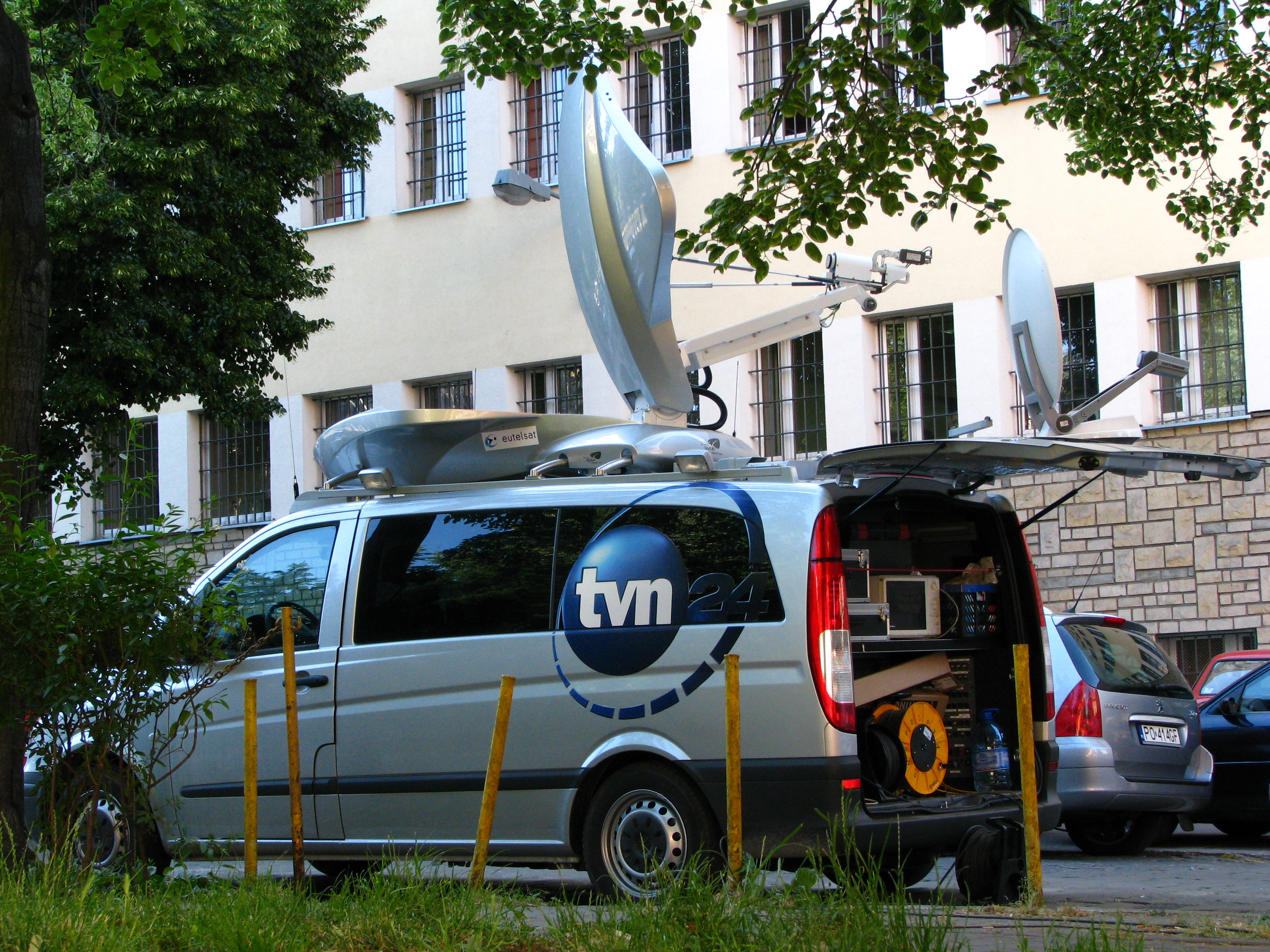
TVN24 broadcasting van

The Polish media environment is highly polarized. Since 2015 elections, this polarization has become ever stronger. The cleavage concerns both PiS's controversial decisions and policies and diverging attitudes towards issues such as equal rights for LGBT people, refugees, the EU.

Poland lacks the tradition of an editorially independent public service media: public radio and television broadcasters tend to favor those in power.

Partisanship in the Polish media system goes hand in hand with bias among the journalists themselves. This bias is mirrored in the two major journalists's organizations that have different orientations: the Association of Polish Journalists (SDP), sympathetic toward the PiS government, and the Association of Journalists (TD), which is against the PiS's government. On 7 December 2020 state-owned petroleum refinery and distributor PKN Orlen acquired media and press company "Polska Press" controlling large number of regional media portals and several regional newspapers. Together with previous acquisition of Polish newspaper distributor RUCH it creates a situation where regional media are owned and distributed by state-owned company raising concerns of media neutrality in Poland. On April 8, 2021, a Polish court has suspended the purchase of Polska Press by PKN Orlen.

== Media ownership ==
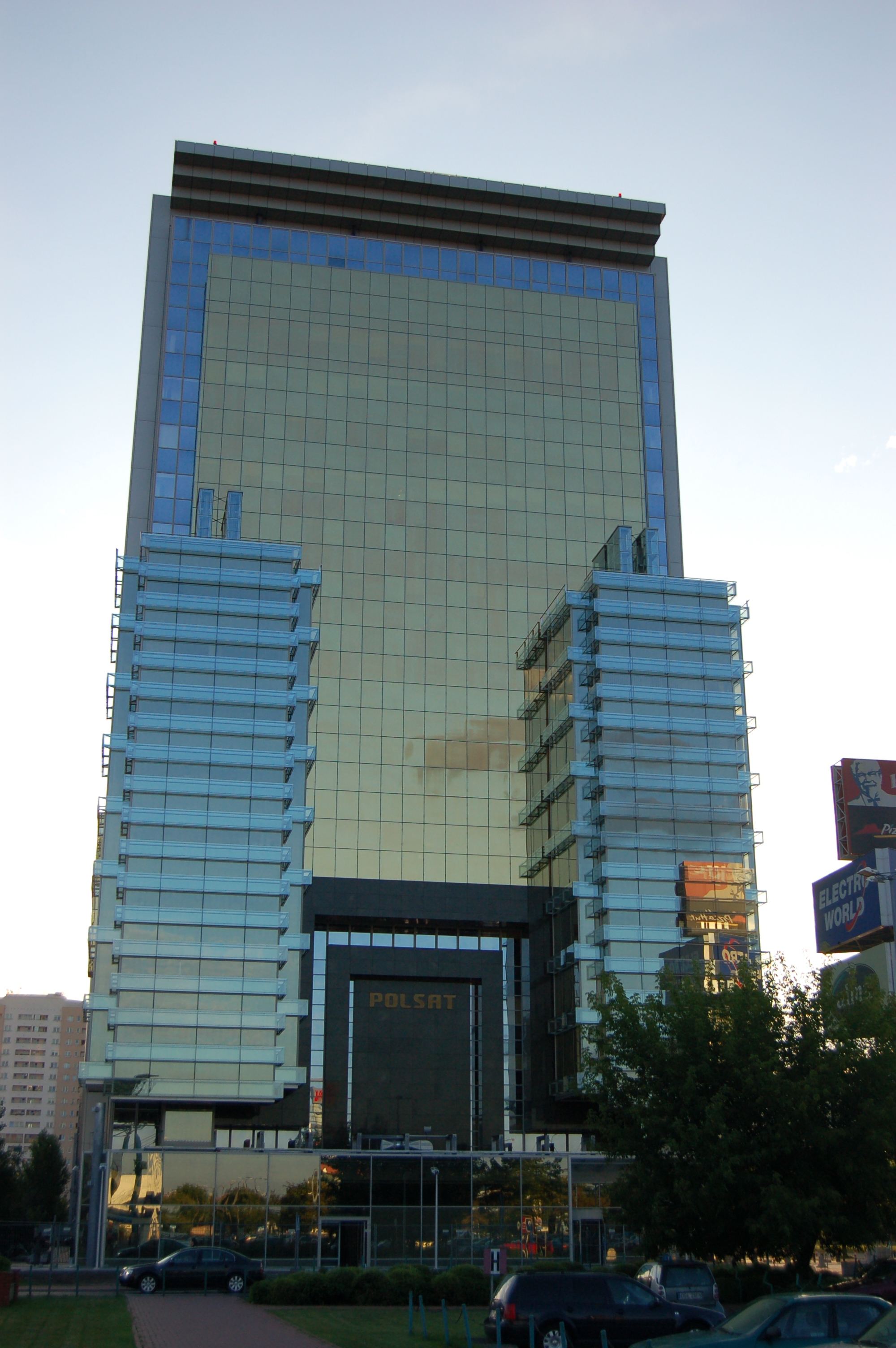
Polsat television building in Warsaw

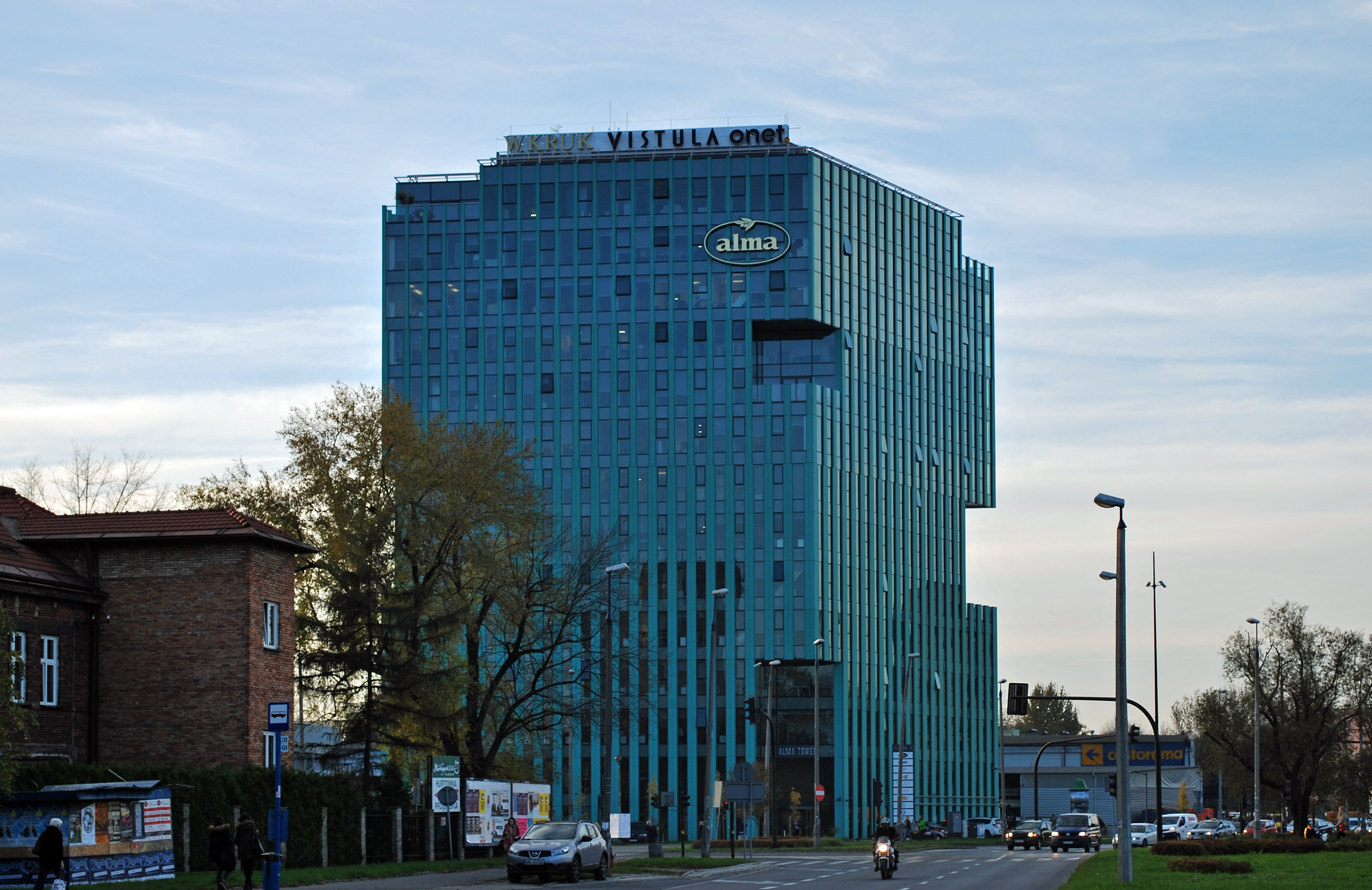
Onet news portal headquarters in Kraków

Foreign companies hold a dominant position in the Polish media market. This fact entered into the political debate, in particular since the PiS government took office. To contrast this, Jarosław Kaczyński, founder of the PiS and former Prime Minister, called for the media to be "repolonized" PiS politicians argued that foreign-owned media outlets pursue deliberately unfavorable coverage of the PiS's government with the aim of undermining it.

Polish print media and radio outlets are mainly private and diversified in terms of ownership, however foreign owners control around three-quarters of the Polish media market. The main domestic competitor is Agora, which owns Gazeta Wyborcza and a number of magazines, radio stations, internet platforms, a publishing house and additional ventures.

Foreign ownership is very strong also in the regional media which are largely owned by the German Polska Press.

To counter foreign ownership in Polish media, in 2021, the PiS government submitted a bill that would ban non-European-Union citizens and companies from possessing a controlling stake in Polish media outlets. In August 11, 2021, The bill Lex TVN which forbids companies except those from the European Economic Area from holding more than a 49% stake in Polish radio and television stations passed the Sejm.

== Media freedom and pluralism ==
In recent years, according to Reporters Without Borders, in particular since the PiS went to power in 2015 and ended in 2023, media freedom in Poland has been significantly deteriorating.

Several weeks after winning the 2015 parliamentary elections, the PiS passed a media law which gave the government direct control over public broadcasting. It also replaced journalists working in the public radio and TV stations and attempted to throttle several independent print media outlets, such as Gazeta Wyborcza, Polityka and Newsweek Polska by restricting public advertising. According to Freedom House, this effort is part of a broader attempt to weaken checks and balances, silence independent voices and control the public sphere. PiS's control on the executive branch and the executive can undermine the independence of the judiciary and its aggressive attitude towards the Constitutional Tribunal has prompted accusations that it is undermining the rule of law in Poland. In January 2016, the European Commission launched a procedure in order to impose the respect of the rule of law in the country.

Reporters Without Borders in its 2019 assessment of Poland stated that the public media "have been transformed into government propaganda mouthpieces." Poland is rated "Partly Free" in Freedom House's 2017 "Freedom of the Press" report. It is ranked 62 out of 180 countries in the 2020 World Press Freedom index by Reporters Without Borders, down from 18th in 2015.

=== Public television and radio broadcasters ===
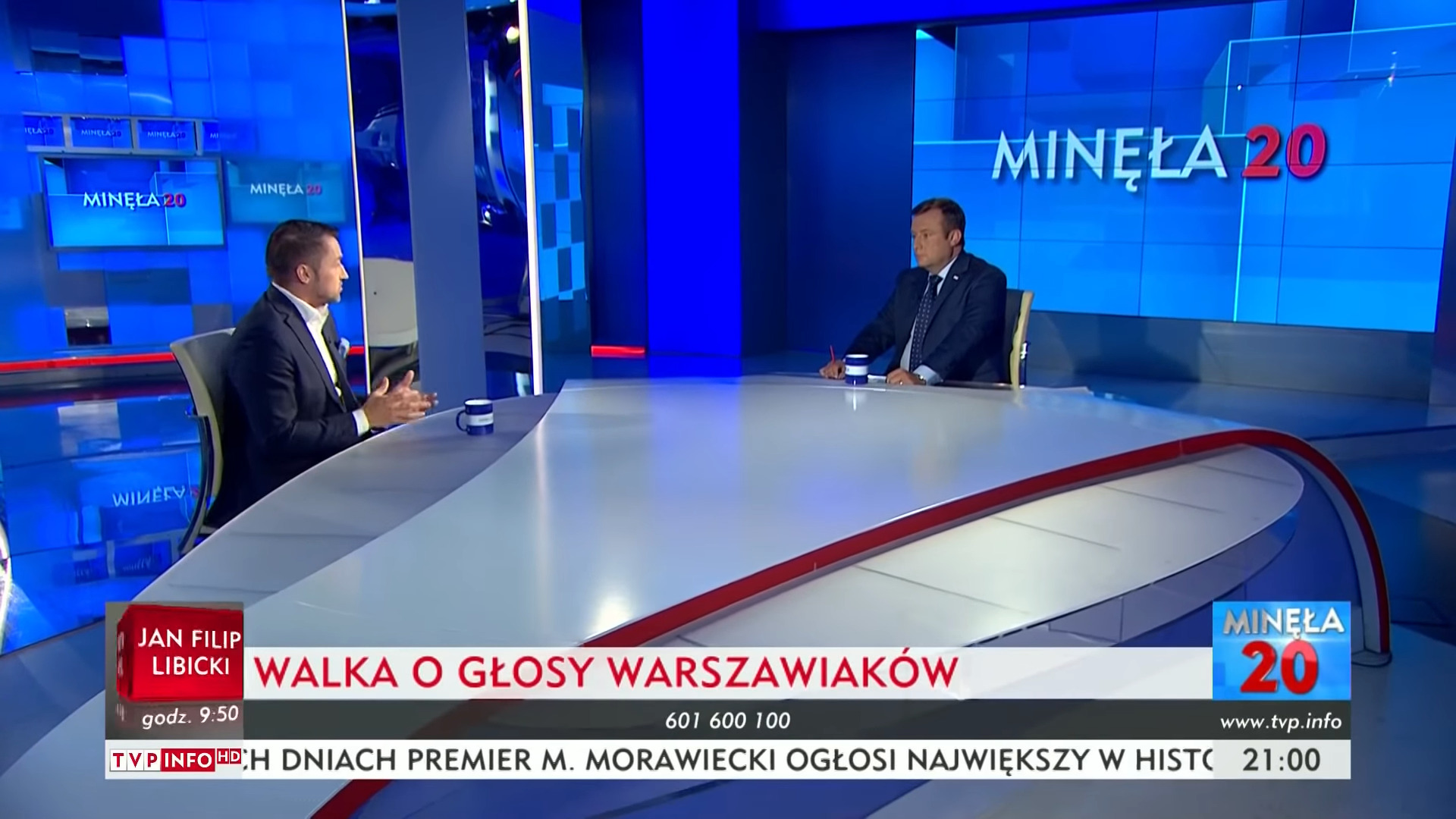
TVP Info live broadcast

After winning parliamentary elections in October 2015, the PiS party replaced the management positions at the public television and radio broadcasters. This effort was not limited to public broadcasters since the party leadership tried to control also private media outlets for instance by advancing a proposal to restrict reporters’ access to the parliament.

In December 2015 the so-called "small media law" prepared by PiS was sent to the Polish parliament. The proposal, which was conceived as a temporary measure before the adoption of a more comprehensive media law, provided for the termination of the mandates of the current members of the national television and radio broadcasters’ management and supervisory boards and their replacement through the direct appointment by the treasury minister. The law created great turmoil in public media: the directors of several public channels left their position in protest. Public protests occurred across Poland as well as abroad in the environment connected the community of Poles living abroad.

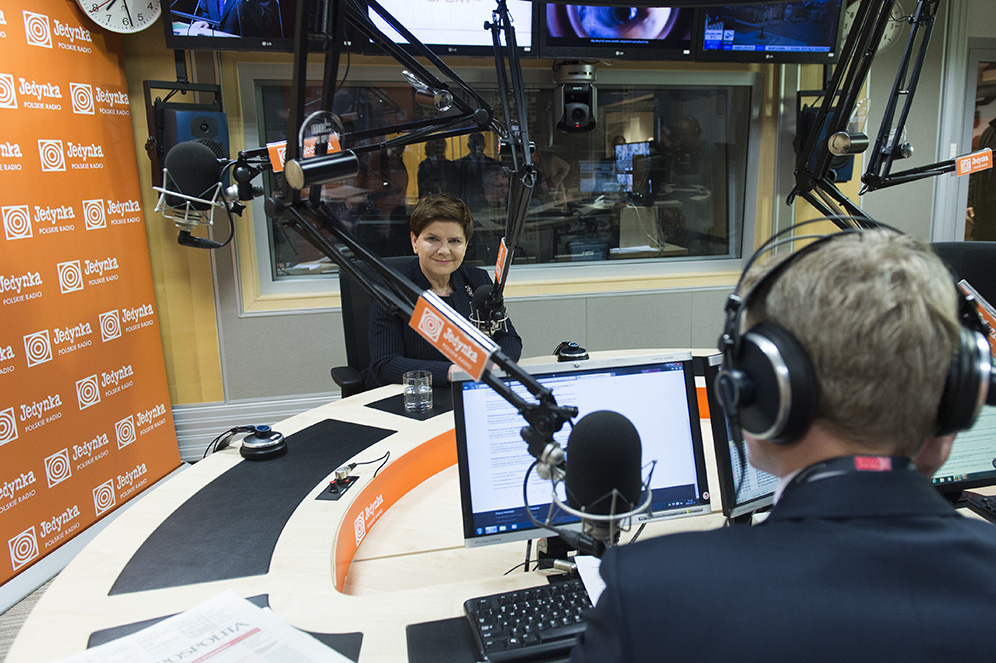
Polish Radio Channel 1 broadcast studio

The staffing changes were not limited to the managing positions. According to the Association of Journalists, 225 journalists left the public media during 2016, due to either layoffs or resignations. The new law and its effects were widely criticized also abroad: the European Federation of Journalists, the European Broadcasting Union, the Association of European Journalists, Reporters Without Borders, the Committee to Protect Journalists and Index on Censorship denounced this decision. In January 2016, the European Commission discussed the "small media law" in the frame of its assessment of the situation in Poland under the Rule of Law Framework.

In December 2016, the Constitutional Tribunal declared parts of the "small media law" unconstitutional, calling for the need to constitutional rules on the KRRiT which should have played a decisive role in appointing its management and supervisory boards.

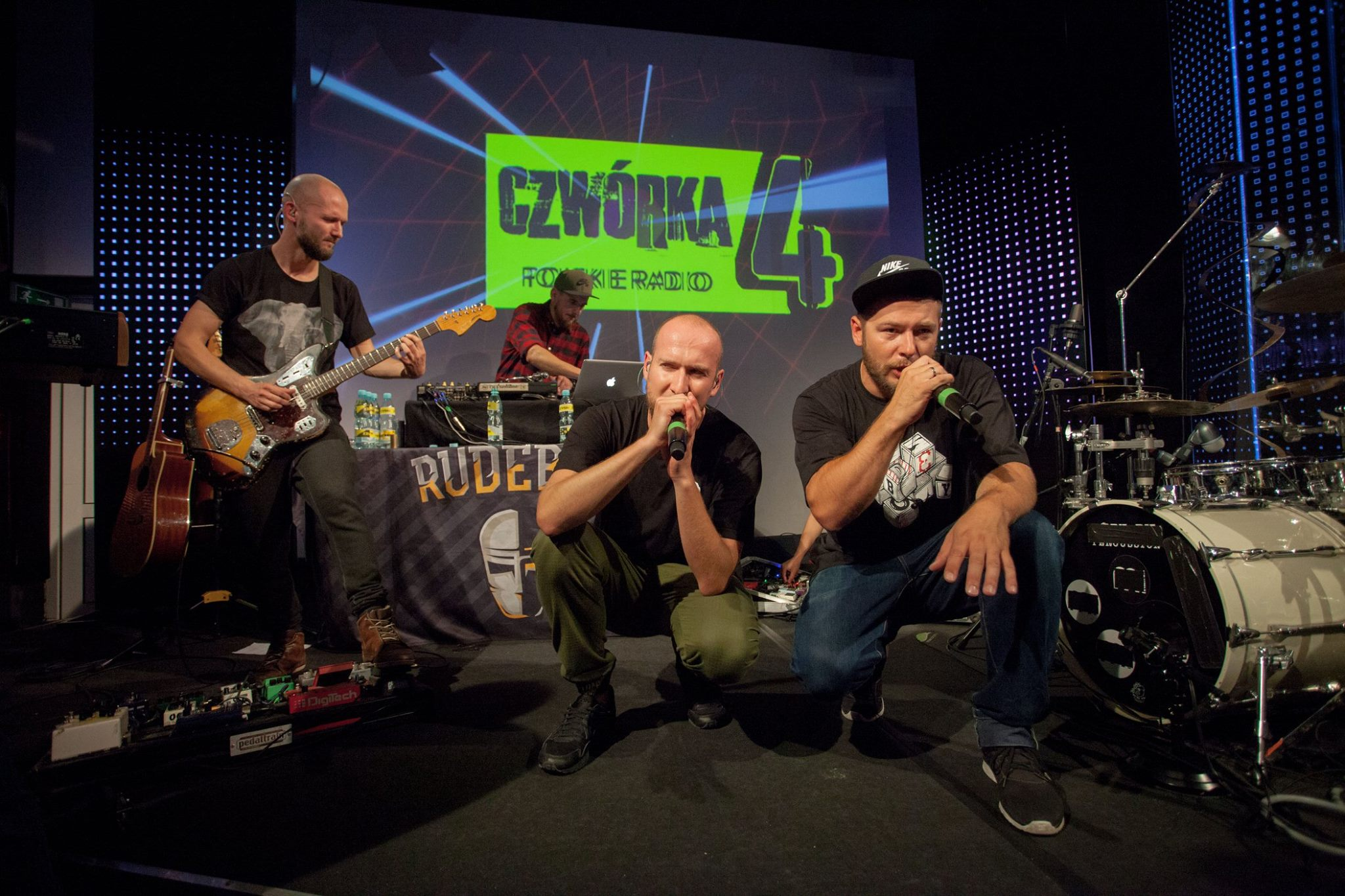
A music concert organized at Polish Radio Channel 4 in 2017

In the first months of 2016 the PiS's government worked on a "big media law", a more comprehensive reform of the media system. In April 2016, a draft Law on National Media was presented to the Parliament. The draft wanted to transform the public radio and television broadcasters into "national media", thus shifting away from the model of editorially independent public service. The bill obliged the public media to disseminate the views of the prime minister, the president, and the speakers of the parliament and stated that the public media should preserve national traditions, patriotic and Christian values and strengthen the national community. The Council of Europe criticized the draft, describing it a move towards a "State broadcasters". The law was not adopted: the government decided to pursue a less ambitious approach and proposed the Parliament a "bridge law" to go into force at the expiration of the "small media law". The "bridge law" was approved in June 2016: the law stated that a newly established National Media Council have to be responsible for the appointment of the management and supervisory boards of the public media. The arrangement established by the law effectively guarantees the rule party a key role in appointing the members of the national Media Council. The law also does not forbid the new council's members from belonging to political party.

== TV stations ==
TVP – public broadcaster

- TVP 1
- TVP 2
- TVP 3 (regional)
- TVP HD
- TVP Info (news and regional)
- TVP Polonia (for Poles abroad)
- TVP Kultura (cultural)
- TVP Seriale (drama)
- TVP Rozrywka (entertainment)
- TVP ABC (children's channel)
- TVP Sport
- TVP Historia (history)
- TVP Parlament
- TVP Dokument
- TVP Kobieta
- TVP Nauka
- Alfa TVP
- Jasna Góra TV
- TVP Historia 2
- TVP Kultura 2
- TVP ABC 2
- TVP World
- TVP Wilno
- Belsat (in Belarusian language)

Polsat – private

- Polsat
- Polsat 2
- Polsat News (24/7 news channel)
- Polsat News 2
- Polsat News Polityka
- Polsat 1 (for Poles abroad)
- Polsat Rodzina
- Super Polsat
- Polsat Sport 1 (sport channel)
- Polsat Sport 2 (sport channel)
- Polsat Sport 3 (sport channel)
- Polsat Sport Fight
- Polsat Sport Premium 1
- Polsat Sport Premium 2
- Polsat Sport Extra (1-4)
- Polsat Games
- Polsat Café (health and beauty)
- Polsat Play (for men)
- Polsat Seriale
- Polsat Doku
- Disco Polo Music
- Polsat Music
- Polsat Viasat History
- Polsat Viasat Explore
- Polsat Viasat Nature
- Polsat Crime+Investigation
- Polsat Film
- TV4
- TV6

TVN Discovery Group – private

- TVN
- TVN 7
- TVN24 (24/7 news channel)
- TVN24 BiS
- TVN Style (channel aimed at women)
- TVN Turbo (for men)
- TVN Fabuła
- iTVN (for Poles abroad)
- iTVN Extra
- TTV
- Food Network
- HGTV Home&Garden
- Travel Channel
- Eurosport 1
- Eurosport 2
- TLC
- Discovery Channel
- Discovery Science
- Discovery Historia (history and documentaries)
- Discovery Life
- Animal Planet
- DTX
- ID
- Metro

*TTV belongs to Stavka (51% - TVN, 49% - Besta Film)

Groupe Canal+ Poland (owned by Canal+ Group (51%), TVN Group (32%), Liberty Global (17%))

- Ale Kino+
- Canal+ Premium
- Canal+ 1
- Canal+ Sport
- Canal+ Sport 2
- Canal+ Film
- Canal+ Seriale
- Canal+ 360
- Canal+ Dokument
- Canal+ Sport 3
- Canal+ Sport 4
- Canal+ Now
- Planete+
- Canal+ Kuchnia
- Canal+ Domo
- MiniMini+
- Teletoon+
- Novelas+
- Canal+ Sport 5
- Canal+ Extra (1-7)

Minor players:

Polcast Television

- Tele 5
- Polonia 1
- Water Planet
- Novela TV

4Fun Media

4Fun.tv

4Fun Kids

4Fun Dance

Lux Veritatis Foundation

TV Trwam

TV Puls

- TV Puls
- Puls 2
- many local city and community cable stations

Many major world players are also present on the market, among them: HBO, HBO2, MTV Poland, NickMusic.

=== Digital TV platforms (all private) ===
- Platforma Canal+ (owned by Canal+ Group (51%), TVN Group (32%), Liberty Global (17%)
- Polsat Box (owned by Polsat Cyfrowy stock company)
- TVN24 GO (owned by TVN Group) - first online news platform in Poland giving access to TVN24 and TVN24 BiS. Platform included broadcast, 29 public programs on live broadcast channels, and TV programs and programs as well as films on demand.

== Radio stations ==
=== Polskie Radio (public broadcaster) ===
- Program 1 (Jedynka) - (news, current affairs, easy listening music, focused at listeners aged 40–64) - 225 LW, FM, DAB+ and the Internet
- Program 2 (Dwójka) - (classical music, drama, comedy, literature) - FM, DAB+ and the Internet
- Program 3 (Trójka) - (rock, alternative, Middle of the Road, focused at listeners aged 25–49) - FM, DAB+ and the Internet
- Program 4 (Czwórka) - (dance, R&B, reggae, rap, soul, focused at listeners aged 15–29) - DAB+ and the Internet
- Polskie Radio 24 - (news/talk) - FM, DAB+ and the Internet
- Audytorium 17 - (public regional radio network) - FM, DAB+ and the Internet
- Radio Poland - (external service in English, Polish, German, Ukrainian, Russian and Belarusian) - 1386 AM, FM (in selected areas abroad), DAB+ (in Poland), satellite and the Internet
- Polskie Radio Chopin - (Polish classical music) - DAB+ and the Internet
- Polskie Radio Dzieciom - (kids/learning) - DAB+ and the Internet
- Polskie Radio Kierowców (Polish Radio for Drivers) - (road news, automotive news and rock music) - DAB+ and the Internet
- 59 thematic radio channels on moje.polskieradio.pl

=== Polish Internet Media ===
1. Onet.pl
2. WP.pl
3. Interia.pl
4. Gazeta.pl
5. TVN24.pl
6. Polsat News
7. Wyborcza.pl
8. RMF24.pl
9. Tokfm.pl
10. Radiozet.pl
11. Zycie.news

=== Privately owned stations ===
Bauer Media Group company:

- RMF FM - hot adult contemporary radio (target demographic 18-44) (nationwide)
- RMF MAXX - contemporary hit radio (target demographic 13-34) (22 local stations)
- RMF Classic - classical and film music (cross-regional station in 19 cities)
- Radio Gra - two local stations in Toruń and Wrocław.
- Radio Jura - local station in Częstochowa.
- Radio 90 - local station in Rybnik/Cieszyn.
- Radiofonia - University Radio in Kraków.

Eurozet company:

- Radio Zet - hot adult contemporary radio (Target Demographic 21-49) (nationwide)
- Meloradio - soft adult contemporary radio (19 local stations)
- Chillizet - chillout and jazz music (4 local stations)
- Antyradio - rock and metal music (cross-regional station in 16 cities)

Grupa ZPR Media company:

- Radio Eska - contemporary hit radio (target demographic 15-34) (39 local stations)
- Eska Rock - mainly rock music (local station broadcasting in Warsaw)
- VOX FM - mostly disco & dance music (cross-regional station in 18 cities)
- Eska2 - only Polish music (19 local stations)
- Radio Plus - upbeat oldies from the '70s, '80s & '90s and Catholic broadcasting (target demographic 40 and older) (18 local stations, some in cooperation with Eurozet)

Agora SA company:

- TOK FM - rolling news, talk, current affairs (cross-regional station in 19 cities)
- Radio Złote Przeboje - mainly oldies music (Target Demographic 30-49) (23 local stations)
- Radio Pogoda - retro music (7 local stations)
- Rock Radio - classic rock music (Target Demographic 18-39) (4 local stations)

Other radio stations

- Radio Maryja - catolic (nationwide)
- Radio Wnet - universal (cross-regional station in 8 cities)

Independent local radio stations, broadcasting on FM

- Akademickie Radio Centrum (Lublin)
- Akademickie Radio Centrum (Rzeszów)
- Akademickie Radio Index (Zielona Góra)
- Akademickie Radio Kampus (Warszawa)
- Akademickie Radio LUZ (Wrocław)
- Białoruskie Radio Racja
- Bon Ton Radio (Chełm)
- Diecezjalne Radio Nadzieja (Łomża)
- Emaus – Katolickie Radio Poznań
- Katolickie Radio Anioł Beskidów (Bielsko-Biała)
- Katolickie Radio Podlasie (Siedlce)
- Katolickie Radio Rodzina (Wrocław)
- Katolickie Radio Zamość (Zamość)
- KRDP – Katolickie Radio Diecezji Płockiej (Ciechanów)
- KRDP – Katolickie Radio Diecezji Płockiej (Płock)
- Muzyczne Radio (Jelenia Góra)
- Nasze Radio (Sieradz)
- Nasze Radio Nostalgicznie (Zduńska Wola)
- POPradio (Pruszków)
- Radio Kaszëbë
- Radio 5 Ełk
- Radio 5 Suwałki
- Radio 7 (Mława)
- Radio Afera (Poznań)
- Radio Akadera (Białystok)
- Radio Alex (Zakopane)
- Radio Bartoszyce
- Radio Bayer FM (Suwałki)
- Radio Bielsko
- Radio Bogoria (Grodzisk Mazowiecki)
- Radio CCM
- Radio Centrum (Kalisz)
- Radio Doxa (Opole)
- Radio Elka (Głogów)
- Radio Elka (Leszno)
- Radio eM Katowice
- Radio eM Kielce
- Radio Express FM (Tychy)
- Radio Fama Kielce
- Radio Fama Słupsk
- Radio Fama Tomaszów
- Radio Fama Wołomin
- Radio Fama Żyrardów
- Radio Fara (Przemyśl)
- Radio Fest (Chorzów)
- Radio Fiat (Częstochowa)
- Radio Głos (Pelplin)
- Radio Gniezno
- Radio Hit (Włocławek)
- Radio i (Białystok)
- Radio Jard (Białystok)
- Radio Jasna Góra (Częstochowa)
- Radio Kolor (Warszawa)
- Radio Kołobrzeg
- Radio Konin FM
- Radio Kujawy (Włocławek)
- Radio Leliwa (Tarnobrzeg)
- Radio LEM FM (Gorlice/Polkowice)
- Radio Malbork
- Radio Nakło
- Radio Niepokalanów (Łódź-Warszawa)
- Radio Norda (Wejherowo)
- Radio Nysa FM
- Radio Oko (Ostrołęka)
- Radio ONY FM (Nysa)
- Radio Ostrowiec
- Radio Parada (Łódź)
- Radio Park (Kędzierzyn-Koźle)
- Radio Piekary
- Radio Płock FM
- Radio Płońsk
- Radio Puławy 24
- Radio Q (Kutno)
- Radio Radom
- Radio Rekord FM (Radom)
- Radio Rekord Mazowsze (Ciechanów)
- Radio Silesia (Zabrze)
- Radio Sochaczew
- Radio Starogard (Starogard Gdański)
- Radio Strefa FM Piotrków
- Radio SUD FM (Kępno)
- Radio Sudety 24 (Strzegom)
- Radio Super FM (Szczecin)
- Radio Tczew
- Radio UWM FM (Olsztyn)
- Radio Vanessa (Racibórz)
- Radio VIA (Rzeszów)
- Radio Victoria (Łowicz)
- Radio Warszawa
- Radio Weekend (Chojnice)
- Radio Wielkopolska
- Radio Września FM
- Radio Ziemi Wieluńskiej (Wieluń)
- Radio Żnin FM
- RDN Małopolska (Tarnów)
- RDN Nowy Sącz
- Rekord – Radio Świętokrzyskie (Ostrowiec Świętokrzyski)
- RSC Radio Skierniewice
- Studenckie Radio Żak (Łódź)
- Trendy Radio (Krosno)
- Twoja Polska Stacja (Częstochowa)
- Twoje Radio (Stargard Szczeciński)

== Press (all private) ==
=== Daily papers ===
- Gazeta Wyborcza (left-wing)
- Rzeczpospolita (centrist)
- Dziennik Gazeta Prawna (centrist)
- Polska (centrist; edited in cooperation with the British daily The Times)
- Gazeta Polska Codziennie (right-wing)
- Fakt (tabloid – German Swiss owned – Axel-Springer)
- Super Express (tabloid)
- Nasz Dziennik (catholic, right-wing)

=== Weekly magazines ===
- Polityka (left-wing)
- Newsweek Polska (Polish edition of Newsweek, left-wing. German Swiss owned. Axel-Springer)
- Do rzeczy (right-wing)
- Sieci (right-wing)
- Przekrój (left-wing)
- Przegląd (left-wing)
- NIE (left-wing, owned by Jerzy Urban, the Polish communist government's spokesman during 1981–1989)
- Gazeta Polska (right-wing)
- Najwyższy Czas! (right-wing to far-right)
- Tygodnik Powszechny (Catholic socio-cultural weekly, centrist to centre-right)
- Niedziela (Catholic, right-wing)
- Gość Niedzielny (Catholic, right-wing)
- Angora (centrist to centre-left Polish and world press review, owned by Agora SA Cox Communications Media Development Investment Fund)
- Forum (world press review, centrist)

== Internet ==
- Top-level domain: .pl
- Internet users: 25.0 million users, 21st in the world; 65.0% of the population, 54th in the world (2012).
- Fixed broadband: 6.4 million subscriptions, 17th in the world; 16.6% of the population, 54th in the world (2012).
- Wireless broadband: 18.9 million subscriptions, 16th in the world; 49.3% of the population, 33rd in the world (2012).
- Internet hosts: 13.3 million hosts, 12th in the world (2012).

== See also ==
- Internet in Poland
- Telecommunications in Poland
- Television in Poland
- CBOS
- Open access in Poland to scholarly communication
- 2023 Polish public media crisis

== Bibliography ==
- Euromedia Research Group; Mary Kelly; et al., eds. (2004). "Poland". Media in Europe (3rd ed.). SAGE Publications. ISBN 978-0-7619-4132-3.
- Glowacki, Michal (2015). "Governance of Public Service Media in Poland: The Role of the Public". Media and Communication. 3 (4): 26–34. doi:10.17645/mac.v3i4.377.
