= Polsat Seriale =

- Logo used since 30 August 2021
- Country: Poland
- Broadcast area: Poland
- Headquarters: Warsaw, Poland

Programming
- Language: Polish
- Picture format: 16:9 576i (SDTV)

Ownership
- Owner: Grupa Polsat Plus
- Sister channels: Polsat; Polsat Film; Polsat Film 2

History
- Launched: 1 September 2013 (Polsat Romans); 6 April 2020 (Polsat Seriale)
- Former names: Polsat Romans (2013–2020)

Links
- Website: https://www.polsatseriale.pl/

Availability

Terrestrial
- Polish digital: Channel 201

Polsat Seriale (formerly known as Polsat Romans) is a Polish television channel which broadcasts movies and television series. It is owned and operated by Polsat.

It started broadcasting on 1 September 2013, as Polsat Romans, 5 April 2020. but changed its name to Polsat Seriale on 6 April 2020.

== History ==
On 22 July 2013, Telewizja Polsat announced that it would launch a new channel called as Polsat Romans on the occasion of the beginning of the 2013/2014 school year.

Polsat Romans was finally launched on 1 September 2013. The on screen logo is colourful which lasted until 2015, before changing into a white Polsat Romans on screen logo, and it returned automatically on 4 April 2020, which is short-lived.

On 2 March 2020, it announced that Polsat Romans will be renamed into Polsat Seriale, in April 2020, after successful years of the "Romans" brand. The announcement was given by Krajowa Rada Radiofonii i Telewizji in 2019, but on 18 March 2020, it was confirmed that Polsat Seriale will launch on 6 April 2020, to coincide the annual rebranding of the thematic channels from Polsat.

On 6 April 2020, Polsat Seriale was launched, after the closure of Polsat Romans. At the same time, Polsat Doku, Polsat Play, Polsat Café, Super Polsat, Polsat Film, Polsat 2 and the international channel Polsat 1 received new logos and graphic design on the same day. The graphics and theme music are derived from the parent channel since February 2019.

On 30 August 2021, Polsat Seriale was rebranded along with other neighbouring Polsat channels. On the same day TVN 7 (TVN Siedem) was given a new look.

== Logo history ==
2013 – 2020	2020 - 2021	2021
