= Edyta Nawrocka =

- Born: Wałbrzych, Poland
- Genres: EDM, melbourne bounce, big room house
- Occupations: singer, songwriter, actress, dancer, TV presenter
- Years active: 2007–present
- Labels: MyMusic, ABP, Celebration
- Website: edytanawrocka.pl

Edyta Nawrocka is a Polish singer, songwriter, actress, dancer and TV presenter. Born in Wałbrzych and raised in Kołobrzeg. She performed dancing roles in stage productions until she decided to get into studio to record her own music. Her single "See More" (ft. Adam Tas) went down in history as the most played track in "DMC" chart of Muzyczne Radio. Her singles "Watch Me" (ft. Ne!tan), "New Chapter", "Escape This World", "Red Red Roses" (ft. Anna Montgomery) got to the top of "HOUSE 20 PL" chart of Muzyczne Radio and were played in "Hot Music Mix" auditions. She was the first and until now the only artist who recorded music videos in Maldives. Her video "See More" was in 5th place in "ONET TOP 10" ranking. Her singles "Nothing Else" and "Come 2 Me" from upcoming debut album "Realization" (ft. P-Turner) got to the top of Talent Pool by Spinnin' Records.

Since 2007 until now she is the news presenter in Telewizja Wałbrzych (WTV Media Group). She is also publicity movies producer and author of official movie relations of hugest Electronic Music Festivals and EDM music reporter. Interviewed Armin van Buuren, Fedde Le Grand, Sebastian Ingrosso, Dash Berlin, Nicky Romero, Dimitri Vegas & Like Mike, Felix da Housecat, Sander van Doorn, Marcel Woods, Westbam, Remady & Manu-L, Curbi, D.O.D and many others.

In 2015 her "Golden Train Song" achieved more than 300,000 views on the Internet only. The song was published and broadcast worldwide in international and Polish media: NBC, Discovery Channel, Daily Mail, RTL, Die Zeit, TVN Poland, Onet.pl, Radio ZET, Radio Eska, Radio Wrocław, History (European TV channel), NDR, MDR, Deutschlandradio.

Since 2016 she cooperates with German artist agency Luxus Events.

== Awards and honours ==
In 2014 she was titled "Hospice's Angel" for charitable activity.
In 2014 she was a panelist in Lower Silesian Women's Congress.
In 2013 she was a prizewinner of "Kobiece Twarze" (Women's Faces) Plebiscite in culture category.
In 2012 she won the Crystal in Lower Silesian Plebiscite "Kryształy i Kamienie" (Cristals & Stones), that honours unique personalities of sociocultural and political sphere.
In 2010 she was granted by the mayor of the city of Wałbrzych for the highest GPA during her postgraduate studies, community commitment and city promotion at national level.
In 2008 she won (next to Cleo) the first prize in POP category in All - Poland Music Competition "Studio Garaż" in Warsaw.
In 2007 she was awarded by Książ Castle Company in "The best student of the region" category for the highest GPA during her undergraduate studies and personal achievements.
In 2006 she reached the semi-finals in All – Poland music competition Eurotalent in Warsaw. She performed with the cover "Nothing Compares to you" by Sinéad O'Connor.

== Education ==
2008 – 2010 Postgraduate Studies, Higher School of Enterprise and Management in Wałbrzych, degree course – Management, major – HRM Human Resources Management, master's degree;
2005 – 2008 Undergraduate Studies, State Higher School of Vocational Education in Wałbrzych, degree course – Leisure and Tourism, speciality – Travel Industry Services, major – Leisure Animation, bachelor's degree;
2002 – 2005 Wałbrzych no. 1 High School with bilingual sections

== Shows ==
She mostly performs at clubs and music festivals. In 2010 - 2012 she gave several dozen concerts within the Muzyczne Radio Tour. Her concerts are dynamic vocal and dance shows. She is also known as Christmas performer, because of her annual Carols' Concerts and Christmas Shows. She was the main artist at the biggest Christmas Party in Poland at Explosion Club in Warsaw. She has appeared twice with Christmas repertoire at the market square in Wrocław during the biggest and most known Christmas Faire. She also performed at the hugest shopping malls during the festive season.

== Music ==
=== Singles ===
| Premiere year | Title | Released | Label |
|---|---|---|---|
| 2016 | Black & White 2.0 (with WaveFirez) | yes | RGMusic Records |
| 2015 | Nothing Else (with P-Turner) | yes | MyMusic |
| 2015 | Go Home B**ch (with P-Turner) | no | - |
| 2015 | Toy (with P-Turner) | no | - |
| 2015 | Come 2 Me (with P-Turner) | no | - |
| 2014 | Życie na Pozór | no | - |
| 2014 | List (with Smuta) | no | - |
| 2013 | Przybieżeli do Betlejem | yes | MyMusic |
| 2013 | Red Red Roses (with Anna Montgomery); Red Red Roses (PlayR Remix); Red Red Roses (Dimitrij & Adrena Line Remix); Red Red Roses (Yelhigh! Remix) | yes | MyMusic |
| 2012 | New Chapter | no | - |
| 2012 | Escape This World (Original Mix); Escape This World (David No Fuck & Vnalogic Remix); Escape This World (PlayR Remix); Escape This World (Soundmaker & Mario Remix) | no | - |
| 2010 | Watch Me (Original Mix by Ne!tan) | yes | MyMusic |
| 2010 | Watch Me (Saxo Extended Mix); Watch Me (Flashtune Remix); Watch Me (Slayback Remix); Watch Me (Daan'D Remix); Watch Me (Braincreator Remix); Watch Me (Cherry Coke Remix); Watch Me (Cuba Club Mix) | no | - |
| 2009 | See More (with Adam Tas); See More (C-Cole Remix); See More (DJ Gaston Arias Tribal Remix); See More (Hexy Remix); See More (Jimmy Stiffler Remix); See More (Mike Muzzo Remix); See More (PlayR Remix); See More (Rom.C, Remakerz & Scarmix Remix); See More (Ryal Remix); See More (Spychool Remix); See More (The Murderer Remix) | yes | ABP/Celebration |
| 2009 | Odnalazłam Się (with PlayR) | no | - |
| 2009 | Double Double (with Kilu) | yes | ABP/ADP |

=== Compilations and CD releases ===
| Release year | Release title | Song | Format | Label |
|---|---|---|---|---|
| 2013 | Music For Run | Red Red Roses (Extended) | Digital/CD | MyMusic |
| 2013 | Muzyczne Święta | Przybieżeli do Betlejem | Digital | MyMusic |
| 2013 | Party Level 1 | Red Red Roses | Digital/CD | MyMusic |
| 2013 | Jesień 2013 | Red Red Roses | Digital/CD | MyMusic/Sony |
| 2012 | Hej! DJ | Escape This World | CD (Promo) | DEE JAY Mix Club |
| 2012 | Treadmill Workouts Music | See More (Jimmy Stifler Remix) | Digital | Sports Audio Tools |
| 2012 | Must Hear House Tunes | See More (C Cole Remix); See More (PlayR Remix) | Digital | Acuna Digital |
| 2012 | Workout Trainer | See More (C Cole Remix); See More (Rom C., Remarkerz Remix) | Digital | Copyright Control |
| 2012 | Workout Music Best od 2012 | See Moe (C Cole Remix) | Digital | Copyright Control |
| 2012 | Legends Of House 2012 | See More (C Cole Remix) | Digital | Acuna Digital |
| 2011 | Sydney Harbour Ultimate Party | See More (Original) | Digital/CD | One Sound Records |
| 2011 | The Essential Electro House Christmas Party | See More (Spychool Remix) | Digital/CD | Club Traxx |
| 2011 | The Essential Xmas Party Big Room House | See More (Mike Muzzo Remix) | Digital/CD | Club Traxx |
| 2010 | Total Balearic Funky House | See More (Marc Lener Mix) | Digital/CD | ABP |
| 2010 | Now That's What I Call Disco | See More (C Cole Remix) | Digital | Celebration |
| 2010 | Poolside Anthems 2010 | See More (Marc Lener Remix) | Digital | Celebration |
| 2010 | This is 2010 Progressive House] | See More (C Cole Remix) | Digital | Baccara |
| 2010 | 100% Club & House Music (DJ Set) | See More (Original) | CD | K10 |
| 2010 | Club Ultra Eternal House | See More (Marc Lener Remix) | Digital | Celebration |
| 2010 | Headstroked | See More (Marc Lener Remix) | Digital | Hamilton |
| 2010 | Made In Tokyo | See More (Rom C., Racemakerz & Scarmix Remix) | Digital | Acunadeep |
| 2010 | Peak Hour Xmass Party Anthems | See More (Original) | Digital | Celebration |
| 2010 | Progressive House Party | See More (The Murderer Remix) | Digital | Celebration |
| 2010 | Sohal Beach House Sexy Sessions | See More (C Cole Remix) | Digital | Acunadeep |
| 2010 | Slimmers Guide Ibiza 2010 | See More (Marc Lener Remix) | Digital | Hamilton |
| 2010 | Techno Vision | See More (Rom C., Remakerz & Scarmix Remix) | Digital | Celebration |
| 2010 | Progressive Vox Attack | See More (The Murderer Remix) | Digital | Celebration |
| 2010 | Sohal Beach Progressive Sessions | See More (Rom C., Remakerz & Scarmix Remix) | Digital | Acunadeep |
| 2010 | Clubland October Sessions | See More (C Cole Remix) | Digital | Acunadeep |
| 2009 | Technolicious | Double Double | Digital | Acunadeep |

=== Music videos ===
| Year released | Song | Place recorded |
|---|---|---|
| 2016 | Black & White 2.0 | Wałbrzych |
| 2015 | Nothing Else | Ibiza |
| 2014 | Życie na Pozór | Książ Castle |
| 2013 | Red Red Roses | Ibiza, Los Angeles |
| 2012 | New Chapter | Warsaw |
| 2012 | Escape This World | Maldives |
| 2011 | See More | Maldives |
| 2009 | Nothing Wrong | Wałbrzych |

== Acting ==
- 2016 - "Trudne Sprawy - odcinek 613" (semi-documental series), role – Julia Bobrowska, on air: Polsat, produced by: Tako Media
- 2015 - "Detektywi w akcji - Potajemne związki" (semi-documental series), role - Marzena "Meggie" Sowińska, on air: Polsat, TV4, produced by: Tako Media
- 2015 - "Dzień, który zmienił moje życie - Dama Pik" (semi-documental series), main role - Agnieszka, on air: Polsat, TV4, produced by: Tako Media
- 2014 - "Sekrety Sąsiadów - Powrót rabusia" (semi-documental series), main role - Izabela, on air: Polsat, TV4, produced by: Tako Media
- 2014 - "Zdrady - Żona z daleka" (semi-documental series), main role - Kaja Glińska, on air: Polsat, Polsat Cafe, Polsat 2, produced by: Tako Media
- 2013 - "Szaniawing - Szaniawski ma władzę" (reading of "Professor Tutka. Nowe Opowiadania" by, Jerzy Szaniawski). VIPs read Szaniawski during celebration of 50 season of Teatr Dramatyczny im. Jerzego Szaniawskiego w Wałbrzychu, directed by: Arkadiusz Buszko
- 2012 - "Trudne Sprawy" (semi-documental series), main role - Julia Łęcka, on air: Polsat, Polsat Cafe, Polsat 2, produced by: Tako Media
