= Wydarzenia =

- Genre: news
- Presented by: Dorota Gawryluk; Bogdan Rymanowski; Agnieszka Mosór; Piotr Jędrzejek
- Country of origin: Poland
- Original language: Polish

Production
- Production locations: Polsat Headquarters, Warsaw
- Editors: Dorota Gawryluk (editor-in-chief); Ewa Jarosławska; Grzegorz Kozak; Artur Tamborski; Agnieszka Mosór; Michał Bochenek; Krzysztof Kaszyński; Iwona Wieraszko; Beata Grabarczyk
- Running time: 26 minutes (18:50); 15 minutes (15:50 on weekdays); 40 minutes (22:00, Polsat News)

Original release
- Network: Polsat; Super Polsat; Polsat News; Wydarzenia 24
- Release: 2004 – present

Related
- Gość Wydarzeń; Rozmowa Wydarzeń; Więcej Wydarzeń; Wydarzenia i opinie

Wydarzenia (Events) is the news program of Polsat, Poland's second biggest television channel, which started airing in 2004. The creator of “Wydarzenia” was Tomasz Lis. Currently, the editor-in-chief of the program is Dorota Gawryluk (at first from March to December 2016, then from March 2018 to present times). The program is produced and aired from Polsat News studio in Warsaw. In 2021, it was confirmed that average audience of "Wydarzenia" is estimated to be at 1.72 million.

Wydarzenia has four editions each day:

- at 12:50 p.m. (on weekdays) – shorter edition which presents a brief summary of the news,
- at 3:50 p.m. (on weekdays) – shorter edition which presents a brief summary of the news,
- at 6:50 p.m. – the main newscast,
- at 9:50 p.m. (only on Polsat News) – the evening forty-minute edition, a summary of the day.
