= Wydarzenia 24 =

Polish 24-hour news channel

- Country: Poland; Worldwide
- Headquarters: Warsaw, Poland

Programming
- Picture format: 16:9 (576i, SDTV); 16:9 1080i (HDTV)

Ownership
- Owner: Grupa Polsat Plus
- Sister channels: Polsat News; Polsat News 2 Polsat News Polityka

History
- Launched: 2 October 2006; 19 years ago (as Superstacja)
- Former names: Superstacja (2006-2021)

Links
- Website: wydarzenia.interia.pl

Wydarzenia 24 is a Polish all-news format TV channel, launched on 2 October 2006 as Superstacja. Prior to the Polsat takeover in 2018, STER, a company affiliated with Polsat's owner Zygmunt Solorz-Żak, was the channel's owner.

== History ==
=== 2006-2009 ===
In March 2006, the National Broadcasting Council awarded a license to Superstacja. The channel's first editor was Sławomir Kińczyk, who resigned in 2007.

Superstacja was launched by Astro Sp. z.o.o. and K&R Enterprises Sp. z.o.o., linked to television producer Ryszard Krajewski. The first company was known for producing Familiada, the Polish adaptation of Family Feud. Initially, financial assistance was assured by an agreement with Capital Partners, but the company resigned from the project. From launch to 30 June 2009 its president was Ryszard Krajewski.

The channel started broadcasting on 2 October 2006. Initially, the idea was to create a tabloid television channel. Among these contents were reports on showbiz stars and crime. Gradually, however, Superstacja started to add more political programming into its schedule. Notable political commentators during this time included Janina Paradowska, Eliza Michalik, Wojciech Mazowiecki and Waldemar Jan Dziak, later Piotr Gembarowski and Mariusz Max Kolonko.

In May 2007, 50% of Superstacja's stocks were sold to Ster, linked to Heronim Ruta, a Cyfrowy Polsat shareholder e and close associate of Zygmunt Solorz-Żak. The agreement between both parties had as its goal recapitalize the company and strengthen its brand in the market.

=== 2009-2019 ===
In March 2009, Ster had controlled all of Superstacja's stocks. A few weeks later, Ryszard Krajewski left and was replaced by Wojciech Mazowiecki. On 15 July 2009 Adam Stefanik was named president of the council of Superstacja.

On 30 September 2019, Superstacja received a new logo and graphics package. The red square is removed, the words Super and Stacja are in a different font and written in uppercase, and the Stacja word is green. Below there is a mini black bar. On screen, the logo was moved, from left-down corner to upper left corner.

=== 2021-present ===
On 7 May 2021 Telewizja Polsat, the owner of Superstacja since 2018, asked National Broadcasting Council about changes in the license to be allowed. These changes covered the channel name and its coverage, from the sensational programmes to the news-based ones. A month later (June 8) modifications were allowed to be taken into force - however, with respect to the former programme style. With that in mind, 10 days later Superstacja finished broadcasting their premieres, being replaced with earlier recorded programmes from the main channel - Polsat.

On 12 August 2021 a new logo was introduced. Also, Telewizja Polsat said that all programmes would be aired from one of state-of-the-art studios in Warsaw.

On 1 September 2021 the news and entertainment formatted Superstacja was renamed to Wydarzenia 24, a headline-based, rolling news channel, using Superstacja's talents and facilities to complement the coverage from Polsat. The channel has been relaunched at 6 am local time under the new name with news programme covered by Ewa Gajewska (since 2024, she works on Telewizja Polska).

== Logo History ==
| 2006 - 2011 | 2011 - 2015 | 2015 - 2019 | 2019 - 2021 | 2021 - 2022 | 2022–present |

== See also ==
- Polsat News
- Polsat News 2
- Polsat News Polityka
