= 8TV =

8TV is a common name for television networks, stations and channels. It may refer to:

- 8TV (Catalonia) in Catalonia, Spain
- 8TV (Malaysian TV network) in Malaysia
- 8TV (Poland) in Poland
- WISH-TV in Indianapolis, USA
