= Telewizja Polsat =

Polish media company

- Type: Subsidiary
- Founded: 5 December 1992; 33 years ago
- Headquarters: Ostrobramska 77, Warsaw, Poland

Telewizja Polsat is a Polish media company and broadcaster of television channels mainly under the Polsat brand.

In November 2010 Cyfrowy Polsat announced that it had acquired 100% of the Telewizja Polsat shares.

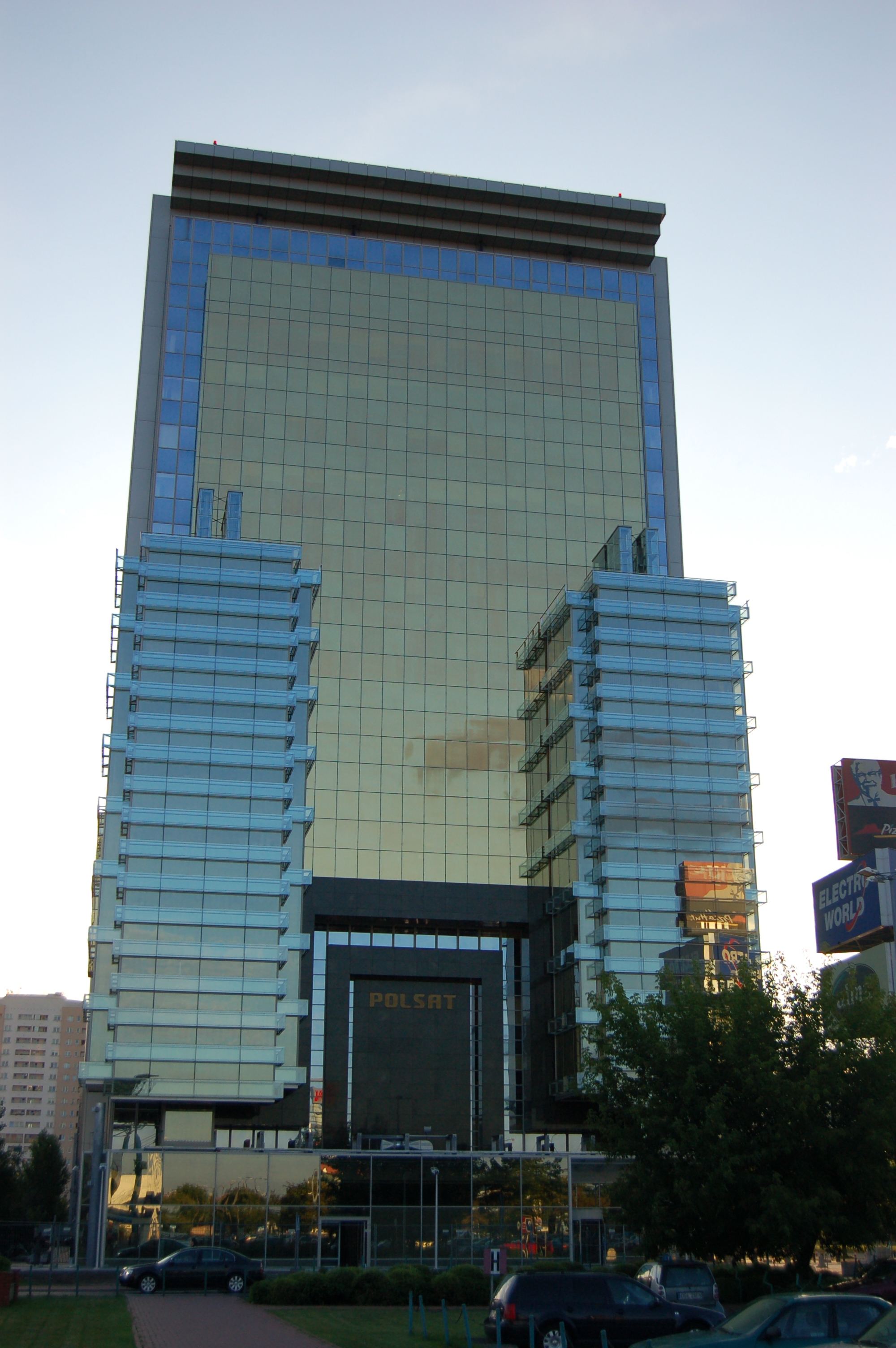
Polsat building in Warsaw.

== Channels ==
=== Entertainment ===
- Polsat (HD)
- Polsat 1 (international)
- Polsat 2 (HD)
- TV4 (HD)
- Super Polsat (HD)
- TV6 (HD)
- Nowa TV (HD)

=== News ===
- Polsat News (HD)
- Polsat News 2 (HD)
- Polsat News Polityka (HD)
- Wydarzenia 24 (HD)

=== Sports/Gaming ===
- Polsat Sport 1 (HD)
- Polsat Sport 2 (HD)
- Polsat Sport 3 (HD)
- Polsat Sport Fight (HD)
- Polsat Games (HD)
- Polsat Sport Premium 1 (HD)
- Polsat Sport Premium 2 (HD)
- Polsat Sport Extra 1 (HD)
- Polsat Sport Extra 2 (HD)
- Polsat Sport Extra 3 (HD)
- Polsat Sport Extra 4 (HD)
- Eleven Sports 1 (HD) (4K)
- Eleven Sports 2 (HD)
- Eleven Sports 3 (HD)
- Eleven Sports 4 (HD)

=== Movies & Series ===
- Polsat Film (HD)
- Polsat Film 2 (HD)
- Polsat Seriale (HD)
- Polsat Comedy Central Extra (HD)

=== Lifestyle ===
- Polsat Café (HD)
- Polsat Play (HD)
- Polsat Reality (HD)

=== Kids & Family ===
- Polsat JimJam
- Polsat Rodzina (HD)

=== Documentary ===
- Polsat Doku (HD)
- Fokus TV (HD)
- Polsat Viasat Nature (HD)
- Polsat Viasat History (HD)
- Polsat Viasat Explore (HD)
- Crime+Investigation Polsat (HD)
- Polsat X (HD)

=== Musical ===
- Polsat Music (HD)
- Disco Polo Music (HD)
- Eska TV (HD)
- Eska TV Extra (HD)
- Eska Rock TV (HD)
- Polo TV (HD)
- VOX Music TV (HD)
- 4fun.tv
- 4fun Dance
- 4fun Kids

=== Teleshopping ===
- TV Okazje
- Mango 24

=== FAST Channels ===
- Miodowe lata
- Chłopaki do wzięcia
- Daleko od noszy
- Dlaczego ja?
- Ewa gotuje
- Gliniarze
- Kabarety
- Komedie
- Nasz nowy dom
- Pamiętniki z wakacji
- Policjantki i policjanci
- Sprawiedliwi - Wydział Kryminalny
- Świat według Kiepskich
- Trudne sprawy
- Wielka rozrywka
- Wielkie festiwale
- Włatcy Móch
- Zbrodnie
- Życiowe historie
- Ślad

=== Planned Channels ===
- Eleven Extra

=== Former Channels ===
- Polsat Kielce
- Polsat Radom
- Polsat Rybnik
- Polsat Zduńska Wola
- Nasza TV
- TVR Bryza
- TV Vigor
- TV Aval
- TV 51
- Dla Ciebie / Ona
- Formuła 1 / On
- Smyk / Junior
- Komedia
- Polsat 2 Info
- Polsat 2 International
- Relaks / Muzyczny Relaks
- Info Dokument / Info
- Polsat Zdrowie i Uroda
- Playboy Polska
- Play TV
- Polsat Futbol
- TV Biznes
- Polsat Biznes
- Polsat News+
- Polsat Volleyball 1 / Polsat Volleyball 1 HD
- Polsat Volleyball 2
- Polsat Volleyball 3
- Polsat Volleyball 4
- Radio PIN
- Muzo TV
- 8TV / 8TV HD
- Hip Hop TV
- Polsat Food Network / Polsat Food Network HD
- Tenis Premium 1 / Tenis Premium 1 HD
- Tenis Premium 2 / Tenis Premium 2 HD
- Polsat Romans
- ATM Rozrywka
- Superstacja / Superstacja HD
- Polsat Sport / Polsat Sport HD
- Polsat Sport Extra / Polsat Sport Extra HD
- Polsat Sport News / Polsat Sport News HD
- Muzo FM
- Polsat Sport Premium 3 PPV / Polsat Sport Premium 3 PPV HD
- Polsat Sport Premium 4 PPV / Polsat Sport Premium 4 PPV HD
- Polsat Sport Premium 5 PPV / Polsat Sport Premium 5 PPV HD
- Polsat Sport Premium 6 PPV / Polsat Sport Premium 6 PPV HD
- Bajki

== Polsat Box ==
The Polsat group operates Polsat Box, one of the main providers of digital multichannel television in Poland. It is the fourth largest digital platform in Europe and the largest in Central and Eastern Europe. The service is distributed over the Hot Bird satellite and includes a mix of free-to-air and encrypted channels requiring a subscription for a minimum of 50 złoty.
