= Polsat Sport 2 =

Polish television sports channel

- Logo used since 26 April 2024
- Country: Poland

Ownership
- Owner: Grupa Polsat Plus
- Sister channels: Polsat Sport 1 Polsat Sport 3

History
- Launched: 15 October 2005
- Former names: Polsat Sport Extra (2005 - 2024)

Links
- Website: www.polsatsport.pl

Availability

Terrestrial
- Polish digital: TV Mobilna - MUX 4 (pay)

Polsat Sport 2 (formerly as Polsat Sport Extra) is a Polish television sports channel owned and operated by Polsat.

== Polsat Sport 2 HD ==
Polsat Sport 2 HD (formerly as Polsat Sport Extra HD) is a second sports channel owned by Polsat, which broadcasts in HD. This channel have the same programming schedule as Polsat Sport Extra.

== Programming ==
In addition to sports events transmitted on Polsat Sport, Polsat Sport Extra broadcasts include:

=== Football ===
- UEFA Champions League
- UEFA Europa League
- UEFA Europa Conference League
- Ukrainian Premier League
- Scottish Cup
- Copa América
- International Champions Cup

=== Tennis ===
- Wimbledon Championships
- ATP World Tour Masters 1000

=== Motorsports ===
- Formula One
- 24 Hours of Le Mans
- Dakar Rally
- Porsche Supercup

=== Speedway ===
- Elite League

=== Rugby ===
- Rugby World Cup
- European Nations Cup

=== Badminton ===
- BWF World Championships

== Logo history ==
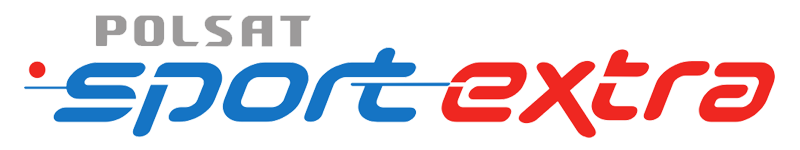
2005 – 2016

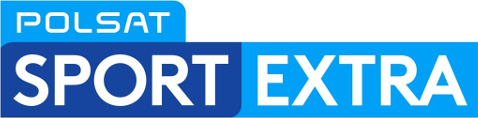
2016 - 2021

2021 - 2024

2024

== See also ==
- Polsat Sport 1
- Polsat Sport 3
