= Eska TV =

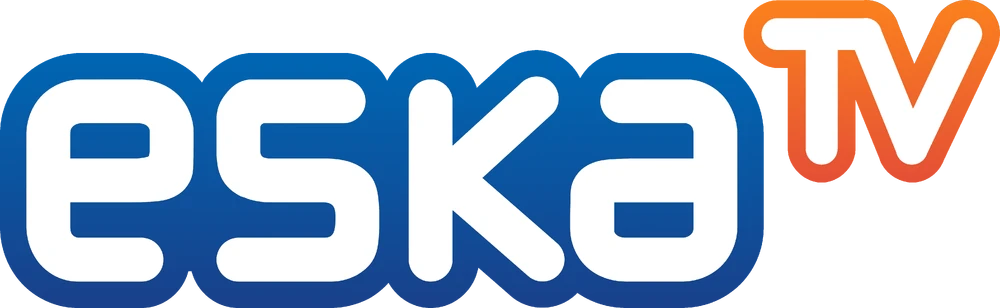
- Country: Poland
- Broadcast area: National; Also part of DVB-T2

Ownership
- Owner: ZPR Media Group (formerly), Grupa Polsat Plus (Present)
- Sister channels: Eska TV Extra; Eska Rock TV

History
- Launched: 8 August 2008

Eska TV is a free-to-air 24-hour Polish language music channel launched on 8 August 2008, in Poland. In the beginning the channel was only on the Internet. After receiving the license for satellite broadcasting, 28 May 2009 got to offer DTH platform n. 26 April 2011 received a concession for digital terrestrial broadcasting. The channel will be in the first DTT multiplex.

The channel presents music videos of artists known from the Eska radio station, interviews and information from the music scene. The station's presenters are journalists known from the Eska radio station Filip Antonowicz, Krzysztof Jankowski and Kamila Ryciak. Eska TV broadcasts its program via Internet and satellite transmission, based on the concession received on 21 April 2009, as well as terrestrially via DVB-T from 19 December 2011 to 28 September 2016 in the first multiplex, in the period from 2 January to 16 June 2017 on local multiplexes and again in the first multiplex from 16 June 2017.

== History ==
The Eska TV channel began its test broadcast on the Internet on 8 August 2008. Since 28 May 2009, Eska TV has been available via satellite and cable to a wider audience, at the same time the channel joined the digital platform n in the Style Moda Muzyka package. On 5 October 2009, the program was decoded from the Hot Bird satellite for owners of HDTV satellite receivers that receive transmissions in the DVB-S2 standard, even though the channel broadcasts its program in SD, not HD. Initially, the channel was supposed to be uncoded for only a few weeks, but after that period it was not coded. Since 1 September 2010, the program has been available on all FTA receivers thanks to broadcasting on the second transponder in the DVB-S system. The DVB-S2 broadcast was switched off on 2 September 2010. Since the beginning of the station's existence, new songs have been broadcast, from genres such as pop-rock, R&B, pop, disco, Hip-Hop, electronic dance music (club music), mainly dance (epic house, euro house, vocal trance), house (including hard house, electro house) and trance. In 2015, Polish-language dance music and disco polo music were also broadcast.

On 25 June 2011, the graphics were refreshed and a new logo and graphic design were introduced. In April 2014, a refreshed station logo appeared, and over the following days, a new design was gradually introduced. On 1 October 2014, a new graphic design was introduced with the current on-screen logo. The bars with the song name had the appropriate color scheme for the program being broadcast (i.e. in the 2011-April 2014 design). After the introduction of the 'cartoon' design in 2015, the bars in all programs had the same color scheme. On 10 July 2015, the HD version of the channel was launched.

Due to falling viewership, the station owner applied in April 2016 for a change of the license from music to entertainment and music and for a change of the station's name to 8TV. The National Broadcasting Council approved the change of the license in May 2016, and on 28 June 2016, granted a second license to broadcast the Eska TV station in cable networks and via satellite. On 28 September, the station was replaced in the first multiplex of digital terrestrial television and via satellite by the music and entertainment station 8TV. The next change of the setting was on 10 October 2016. A setting with dancers was introduced. The beams remained unchanged. On 2 January 2017, the station returned to DVB-T, this time being included in the multiplexes of local stations NTL Radomsko, TVT, Echo 24 and TV Łużyce, covering Silesia and partly the Łódź province. On 30 August 2018, new bars were introduced with the name of the artist and the title of the song. On 20 May 2019, new graphics were introduced.

On 28 May 2019, the station celebrated its 10th anniversary.

On 8 August 2022, the station began broadcasting in HD quality via satellite, replacing the SD version.

=== Terrestrial broadcasting ===
Eska TV entered the competition for a place in the MUX-1 of Terrestrial Digital Television. On 26 April 2011, the National Broadcasting Council granted Eska TV a license for terrestrial broadcasting within the NTC. The channel was in the first multiplex next to the three main TVP channels (TVP 1 HD, TVP 2 HD and regional television) and three selected in the same competition. From 19 December 2011 to 28 September 2016, Eska TV broadcast terrestrially. On 28 September 2016, it was replaced by the 8TV station. On 16 June 2017, Eska TV returned to the first multiplex, replacing the 8TV channel. The previous place of the Eska TV channel was taken by the Eska TV Extra station. Since 28 March 2022, with the introduction of the DVB-T2 broadcasting standard in the Lower Silesian and Lubuskie Voivodeships, the station has been broadcasting in HD quality. Since 27 June 2022, (only) the HD version is available throughout Poland.

== See also ==
- Television in Poland
