= 4fun.tv =

Polish music video channel

4Fun.tv
- Country: Poland

Programming
- Language: Polish
- Picture format: 576i (16:9 SDTV)

Ownership
- Owner: Grupa Polsat Plus
- Sister channels: 4Fun Dance; 4Fun Kids

History
- Launched: 14 February 2004; 22 years ago

Links
- Website: www.4fun.tv

4Fun.tv is a free-to-air 24-hour Polish language music video channel launched on 14 February 2004.

== History ==
On 27 November 2003, Nova Communications (later 4fun Media) signed a satellite transmission agreement with Canal+ Sp. z o.o. for the upcoming music channel. On 14 February 2004, 4fun.tv began broadcasting tests, and the licence for satellite broadcasting of the channel was granted to the broadcaster by Krajowa Rada Radiofonii i Telewizji on 14 May 2004. For some time in 2012, the videos broadcast on 4fun.tv and on the sister channel RBL.TV were broadcast on Puls 2.

The channel presents mainly music videos, music programs, interactive programs in Dolby Digital Plus audio transmission and compression standard. In 2013, 4Fun Media created a 4Fun App for its audiences - a second screen application that allows access to additional content, quizzes and live contact with audiences.

Since 19 December 2013, 4fun.tv has been broadcasting on local multiplexes as part of digital terrestrial television.

In 2016, the satellite operator Eutelsat awarded the station with an award in the category of the Best Musical Channel. 4fun.tv was the only award-winning Polish station in the Eutelsat TV Awards 2016 competition.

== Controversies ==
In 2007, the Krajowa Rada Radiofonii i Telewizji expressed reservations about programmes which may depress and adversely affect the moral and mental development of young people broadcast during a protected period (6 a.m. - 2 p.m.) and without proper designation (programmes only for persons over 18 years of age). The station ignored the Broadcasting Council's warnings and therefore threatened to withdraw the licence of the station, and consequently close and end the channel broadcasting.

== Logo ==
2004 - 2008	2008 - 2014	2014 - 2015	2015 - 2017	2017–present
