= Polsat Sport 3 =

Polish television sports news channel

- Logo used since 26 April 2024
- Country: Poland

Programming
- Picture format: 1080i (HDTV)

Ownership
- Owner: Grupa Polsat Plus
- Sister channels: Polsat Sport 1 Polsat Sport 2

History
- Launched: 30 May 2011; 15 years ago
- Former names: Polsat Sport News (2011 - 2024)

Links
- Website: https://www.polsatsport.pl/

Polsat Sport 3 (formerly as Polsat Sport News) is the first Polish TV station aimed at sports news. Polsat Sport News was launched on May 30, 2011, at 7:00.

== History ==
On October 25, 2010, the program appeared as an internal test channel on channel 146 of Cyfrowy Polsat. On May 25, 2011, the station began testing digital terrestrial television in the second multiplex. On May 30, 2011, regular broadcasting started at 7am, but was not available to digital satellite platform users. On August 11, 2011, the station was made available to the users of the Cyfrowy Polsat. On November 4, 2011, the channel was officially added to n and Telewizji na Kartę. On November 1, 2012, Polsat Sport News launched advertising. The channel starts at 7:00 and ends at 1:15.

On January 2, 2017, Polsat Sport News was replaced by Super Polsat in the second digital terrestrial multiplex.

Polsat Sport News started its broadcast in HD quality on the basis of a satellite concession. It will be available on satellite platforms as well as in cable and IPTV networks, and its schedule will be a continuation of the program offer previously broadcast on the grounds of the Polsat Sport News.

== Logo history ==
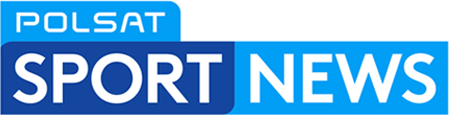
2011 – 2016	2016 – 2021	2021 – 2024	2024 - now
