= Polsat News =

Polish 24-hour news channel

- Logo used since 30 August 2021
- Country: Poland
- Broadcast area: Poland; United States

Programming
- Language: Polish
- Picture format: 16:9 576i (SDTV); 16:9 1080i (HDTV)

Ownership
- Owner: Grupa Polsat Plus
- Sister channels: Polsat; Polsat News 2 Polsat News Polityka; Wydarzenia 24

History
- Launched: 7 June 2008; 18 years ago (SD version); 3 February 2014; 12 years ago (HD version)

Links
- Website: www.polsatnews.pl

Availability

Terrestrial
- Polish digital: Polsat Box - MUX 4 Channel 119 (pay)

Streaming media
- Sling TV: Internet Protocol television

Polsat News is a Polish news channel, launched on 7 June 2008 at 7 am (UTC+1). Being a part of the Polsat Network, Polsat News is owned by the Polsat Group. It is available over Polsat Box, Platforma Canal+, and UPC Poland digital platforms in Poland. It is broadcast on Hot Bird 6, 11158V, 27500 3/4.

== History ==
Polsat News started broadcasting on 7 June 2008, thirty seconds before the 7 am hour (UTC+1). Polsat News is the first Polish news channel to broadcast in a 16:9 format. From 7 June to 14 July, the channel was broadcast in a test emission. Up to September, the channel was broadcast as FTA.

The live program is broadcast from 6 a.m. to 24:00 (UTC+1). The news programmes are broadcast every half an hour. The channel hires about 400 people.

On 1 August 2008, Polsat News started broadcasting adverts.

Programmes are split into three parts: morning – Nowy Dzień (New Day), afternoon – To jest dzień (It's the Day), and evening – To był dzień (That Was a Day).

On 6 June 2008, Polsat News opened a TV studio in which its programmes are recorded and where Wydarzenia (the main Polsat news programme) is recorded. Its cost was €6,000,000.

An HD version for this channel was launched on 3 February 2014 for a crystal-clear vision of the network.

Polsat News, along with other neighbouring ⁣⁣Polsat⁣⁣ channels, started teasing their rebranding on July 31, 2021. The logo change took effect on 30 August 2021.

== Programmes ==
- W rytmie dnia (In the rhythm of the day, every half an hour)
- Pogoda (Weather)
- Sport (Sport)
- Nowy dzień (New Day, block programming from 6:00 am to 10 am) – also in Polsat from 6 am to 9 am every day
- Dzień na świecie (Day in the World, an evening report of current affairs around the world, 10:30 pm – 11:30 pm)
- Obraz dnia (The Image of the Day, a report summarising the day, 11:30 pm - 12 am)
- Wydarzenia (Events, Polsat news service, 12:50 pm, 3:50 pm and 9:50 pm)
- Więcej "Wydarzeń" (More "Events", extended news service after the 3:50 pm edition of Wydarzenia)
- Interwencja (coverage of affairs that are minor but often controversial)
- Graffiti (a political morning talk show)
- Punkt widzenia (Point of View, talk show, 4:30 pm - 6:30 pm)
- Studio Parlament (6:30 pm - 19:20 pm)
- Gość "Wydarzeń" (Guest of "Events", a news service)
- Prezydenci i Premierzy (Presidents and Prime Ministers, Saturday weekly programme, 7:20 pm - 7:50 pm)
- Debata dnia (Debate of the day, 7:50 pm - 9:35 pm) - also in TV Biznes
- Debata wyborcza (Election Debate, Saturday weekly programme)

== Logo history ==
Years	Description	Logo
7 June 2008 - 30 August 2021	Modeled on the logotype Polsat television The bulk of the gray color or glaucous, with the word "NEWS" and the symbol of the arrow (top right), smaller - orange.	
from 30 August 2021	Blue (light blue and dark blue in the gradient version) stripes forming a sphere, below it is a blue text 'polsat news'.	

== Regional centres ==
Poland:

- Białystok
- Gdańsk
- Jelenia Góra
- Katowice
- Kraków
- Lublin
- Łódź
- Olsztyn
- Poznań
- Słupsk
- Szczecin
- Wrocław
- Zakopane

Centres in other countries:

- Berlin
- Brussels
- London
- Moscow
- Paris
- Washington D.C.

== See also ==
- Polsat
