= Polsat Sport 1 =

Polish television sports channel

- Logo used since 26 April 2024
- Country: Poland

Programming
- Picture format: 16:9 576i (SDTV); 1080i (HDTV)

Ownership
- Owner: Grupa Polsat Plus
- Sister channels: Polsat Sport 2 Polsat Sport 3

History
- Launched: 11 August 2000; 26 years ago
- Former names: Polsat Sport (2000 - 2024)

Links
- Website: www.polsatsport.pl

Availability

Terrestrial
- Polish Digital: TV Mobilna - MUX 4 (pay)

Polsat Sport 1 (Polish pronunciation: [ˈpɔl.sat ˈspɔrt jɛˈdɨŋ.ka]) is a Polish sports channel owned by Polsat. It launched on 11 August 2000 and is available via satellite on Polsat Box.

== Polsat Sport 1 HD ==
Polsat Sport 1 HD is a sports channel owned by Polsat, which broadcasts in High Definition. It was established in 2008. In its first showing in Poland UEFA European Football Championship (2008) in HD. Polsat Sport HD had own scheduling, combining sports, and stores shown in the other sports channels belonging to the Polsat. Polsat Sport HD have the same programming schedule as Polsat Sport from June 1, 2012.

== Programming ==
=== Football ===
- Eredivisie
- Fortuna:Liga
- Coupe de France
- Scottish Professional Football League
- Scottish Cup
- UEFA Europa League (Polsat Sport Premium channels)
- UEFA Europa Conference League (Polsat Sport Premium channels)
- UEFA Nations League

=== E-Sports ===
- League of Legends Championship Series

=== Motorsports ===
- MotoGP
- Moto2
- Moto3
- MotoE World Championship
- FIA World Endurance Championship (except for the 24 Hours of Le Mans )

=== Volleyball ===
- FIVB Volleyball Men's World Championship
- FIVB Volleyball Women's World Championship
- Men's European Volleyball Championship
- Women's European Volleyball Championship
- FIVB Volleyball men's and women's Nations Leagues
- FIVB Volleyball Men's World Cup
- FIVB Volleyball Women's World Cup
- FIVB Volleyball World Grand Champions Cup
- FIVB Volleyball Men's Club World Championship
- FIVB Volleyball Women's Club World Championship
- Polish Volleyball League
- Polish Women's Volleyball League
- FIVB Beach Volleyball World Tour

=== Tennis ===
- Wimbledon Championship
- ATP Tour

=== Athletics ===
- IAAF Diamond League

=== American football ===
- European League of Football
- NFL

=== Boxing ===
- Sauerland Events
- Premier Boxing Champions

=== Mixed Martial Arts ===
- UFC
- Cage Warriors

=== Rugby ===
- Rugby World Cup

=== Multisport Events ===
- 2024 Summer Paralympics

== Logo history ==
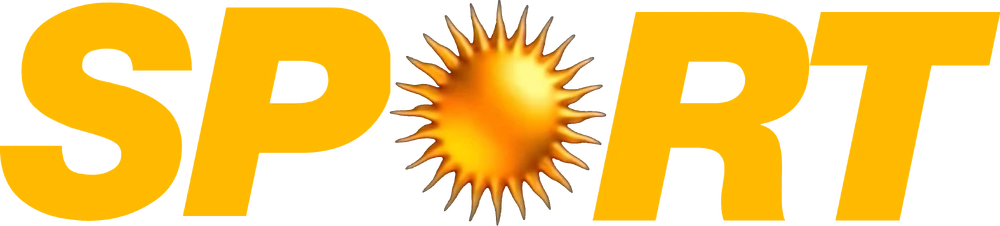
2000 – 2003

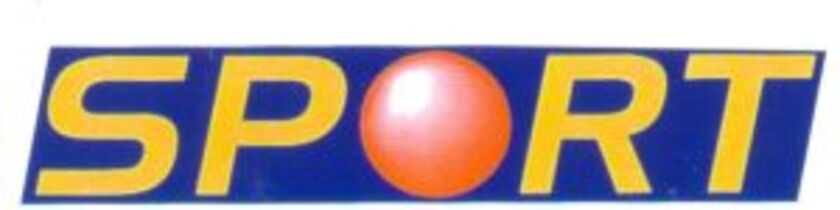
2003 – 2005

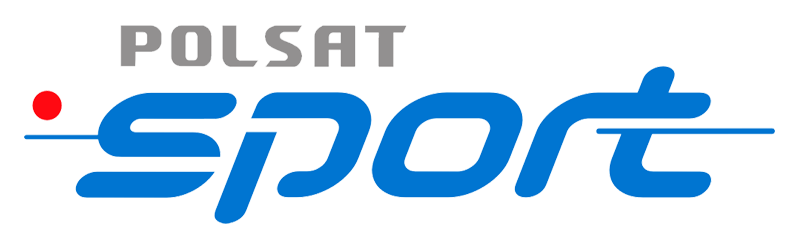
2005 – 2016

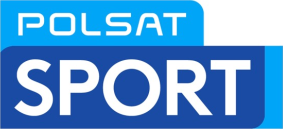
2016 - 2021

2021 - 2024

2024

== See also ==
- Polsat Sport 2
- Polsat Sport 3
