= Polsat 1 =

Polish television channel

- Logo used since 30 August 2021
- Country: Poland
- Broadcast area: Europe; United States; Canada; Caribbean; Latin America; Middle East; Africa; South Asia; Asia Pacific; Australia
- Network: Polsat
- Headquarters: Warsaw, Poland

Programming
- Language: Polish
- Picture format: 576i (16:9 SDTV)

Ownership
- Owner: Grupa Polsat Plus

History
- Launched: December 18, 2015; 10 years ago

Links
- Website: www.polsat1.pl

Availability

Streaming media
- Sling TV: Internet Protocol television

Polsat 1 is a Polish television channel belonging to Grupa Polsat Plus who started on 18 December 2015. This channel replaced Polsat 2 for International viewers (while still being available for Polish viewers).

== Programming ==
The channel offers Polsat series, including:

- Na krawędzi,
- Pielęgniarki,
- Przyjaciółki,
- Świat według Kiepskich,
- To nie koniec świata,
- Trudne sprawy;

hobby programs, like

- Ewa gotuje
- Taaaka ryba

entertainment programs, such as

- Kabaret na żywo
- Nasz nowy dom

and programs directed to Polish people living in the United States like Oblicza Ameryki.

== Logo history ==
| 2015–2020 | 2020–2021 | 2021–present |
