= Polsat Film =

Polish television channel

- Logo used since 30 August 2021
- Country: Poland
- Broadcast area: Poland
- Headquarters: Lublin, Poland

Programming
- Language: Polish
- Picture format: 16:9 576i (SDTV); 16:9 1080i (HDTV)

Ownership
- Owner: Grupa Polsat Plus
- Sister channels: Polsat; Polsat Film 2 Polsat Seriale

History
- Launched: October 2, 2009

Links
- Website: www.polsatfilm.pl

Availability

Terrestrial
- Polish digital: TV Mobilna - MUX 4 (pay)

Polsat Film is a Polish television channel which broadcasts movies.

Polsat received a license to broadcast on March 17, 2009, under the name "Polsat Kino". It started broadcasting on October 2, 2009. It is available from satellite platforms Polsat Box, and Canal+. It was one of several channels launched by Polsat within a few months. It initially broadcasts between 11 a.m. and about 1 a.m.

During its first week on the air, it received a 0.31 percent share of overall viewing, which was about the same as established channels such as Hallmark Channel and Comedy Central.

On April 6, 2020, Polsat Film changed its logo and graphic design along with neighboring Polsat Channels.

The logo was changed again, on August 30, 2021, with the major rebranding of Polsat, and its television channels.

== Logo history ==
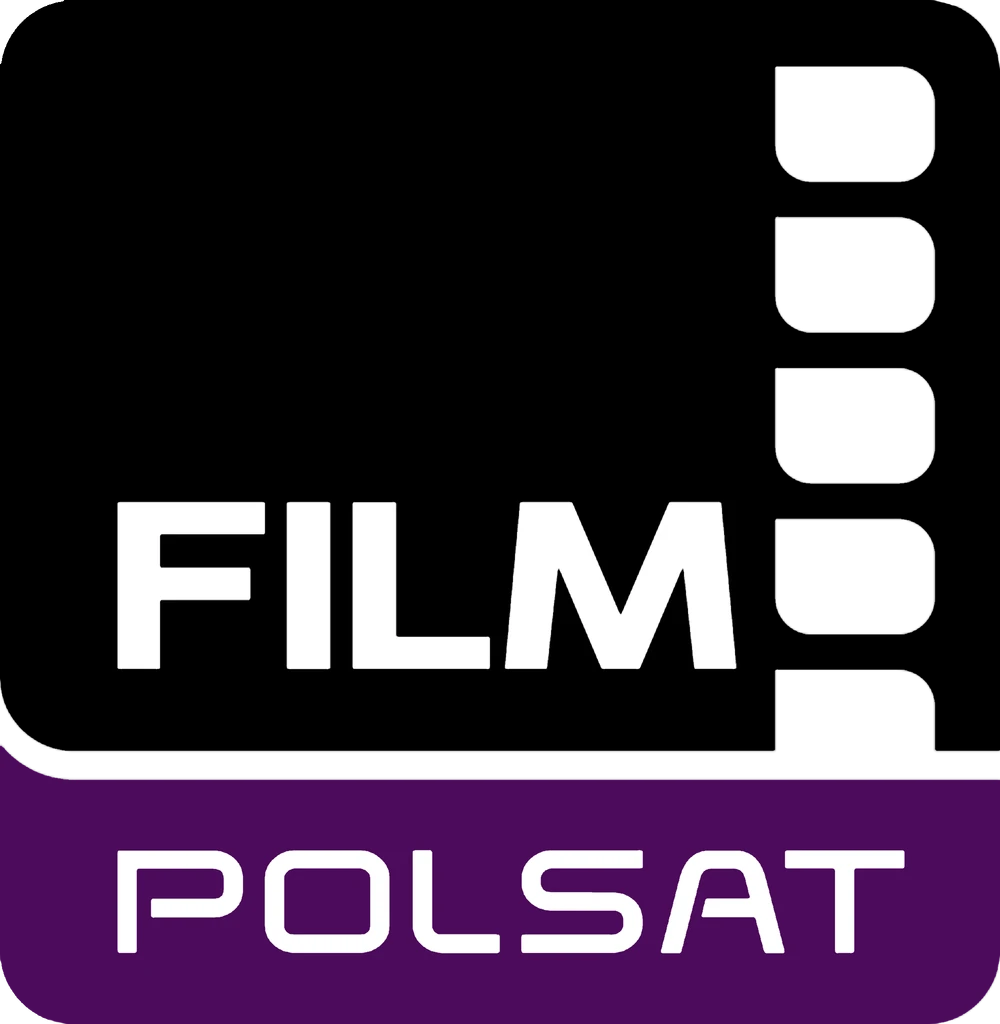
2009 – 2020

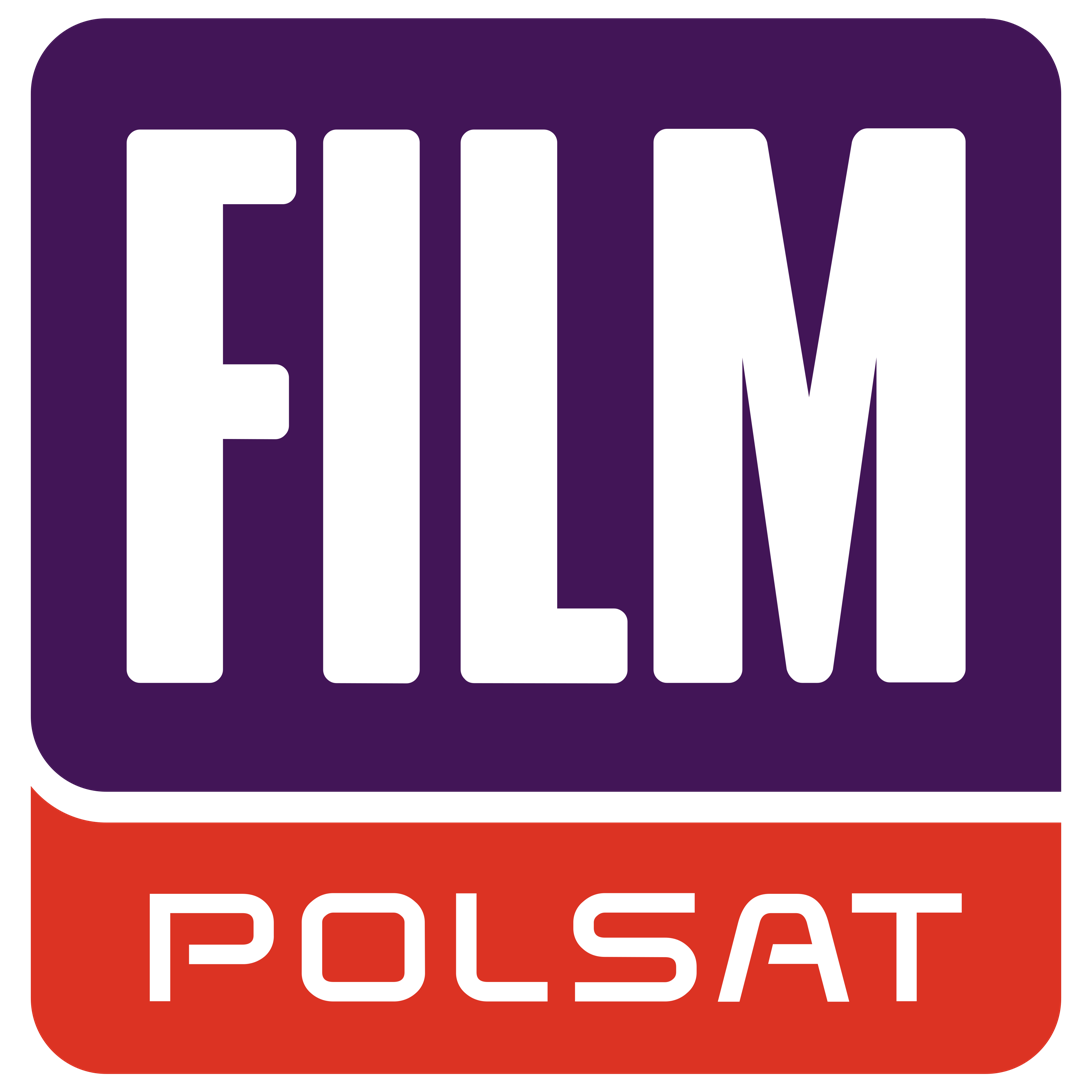
2020 - 2021

2021
