= Polsat News 2 =

Polish 24-hour publicist-information channel

- Logo used since 30 August 2021
- Country: Poland
- Broadcast area: Poland
- Network: Polsat
- Headquarters: Warsaw, Poland

Programming
- Language: Polish
- Picture format: 576i (16:9 SDTV); 1080i (16:9 HDTV)

Ownership
- Owner: Grupa Polsat Plus
- Sister channels: Polsat; Polsat News; Polsat News Polityka; Wydarzenia 24

History
- Launched: 9 June 2014; 12 years ago
- Former names: TV Biznes (2004–2013); Polsat Biznes (2013–2014); Polsat News + (2014)

Links
- Website: www.polsatnews.pl

Polsat News 2 (formerly TV Biznes, Polsat Biznes and Polsat News +) is a Polish publicist-information television channel. It complements the main sister channel Polsat News, with in-depth commentary. It broadcasts programs devoted to national, foreign, political, economic and cultural events.

== History ==
The channel was created in September 2004 as TV Biznes. The founder and owner of TV Biznes was Professor Piotr Chomczyński and Piotr Barełkowski. On 8 February 2007 Telewizja Polsat became the owner of the channel. On 18 February 2013 TV Biznes was renamed Polsat Biznes.

On 9 June 2014 at 10 am, the channel was relaunched as Polsat News +. The plus sign was saved in the same way as in the Plus mobile logo, having the same owner as Polsat. However, on 31 July 2014, the name was changed to Polsat News 2 following a lawsuit filed by Polsat with ITI Neovision, the owner of the competing nc+ platform. Since ITI Neovision has the plus sign (taken from its main shareholder Canal+) all its own channels, the District Court has decided to secure the suit for the duration of the ongoing process by ordering Polsat to change its name. In November 2014, the Court of Appeal reviewed Polsat's appeal and overturned the previous decision, allowing the channel to be restored to its current name. Polsat has not yet decided on a possible renaming of the channel. In December 2014 the District Court in Warsaw issued a judgment which dismissed the suit nc+ in its entirety, but the verdict is not legally binding. However, the Court has forbidden the platform to use the "+" symbol in the name of the channel Polsat News + and the programme + Kultura. In addition to the prohibition, the court ordered the TV station falsity to announce that it can not use the + sign in its channels.

In June 2018, the company stopped producing and broadcasting its own programs.

On 30 August 2021, the channel adopted a new logo, as a part of corporate-wide rebranding of Grupa Polsat Plus.

From 16 April 2024 the channel is available in HD quality.

== Programming ==
The flagship program is To był dzień na świecie. In addition, the framework includes programs previously broadcast on Polsat Biznes, i.e. Zoom na giełdę, Biznes Informacje, Nie daj się fiskusowi oraz nowe: Prawy do Lewego, Lewy do Prawego, Rozmowa polityczna, WidziMiSię, Wysokie C, poŚwiata, Od redakcji, Pociąg do polityki, Fajka pokoju i Naczelni.

== Logo History ==
Years	Description	Logo
18 February 2013 - 9 June 2014	Modeled on the logotype Polsat television The bulk of the gray color and cyan color or glaucous, with the word "BIZNES" and smaller - cyan.	
9 June - 31 July 2014	Modeled on the logotype Polsat television The bulk of the gray color or glaucous, with the word "NEWS" and the symbol of the plus, smaller - orange.	
31 July 2014 - 30 August 2021	Modeled on the logotype Polsat television The bulk of the gray color or glaucous, with the word "NEWS" and the symbol number 2, smaller - orange.	
from 30 August 2021	Blue (light blue and dark blue in the gradient version) stripes forming a sphere, below it is a blue text 'polsat news 2'.	
