= Polsat Doku =

- Logo used since 30 August 2021
- Country: Poland
- Broadcast area: Poland
- Network: Polsat
- Headquarters: Warsaw, Poland

Programming
- Language: Polish
- Picture format: 576i (16:9 SDTV); 1080i (HDTV)

Ownership
- Owner: Grupa Polsat Plus
- Sister channels: Polsat; Polsat X

History
- Launched: 10 February 2017; 9 years ago

Links
- Website: www.polsatdoku.pl

Polsat Doku is a Polish television channel belonging to Telewizja Polsat, which was launched on February 10, 2017 at 6 am. The broadcast, also as HD version via the Hot Bird 13B satellite, was included in the offer of Polsat Box, Platforma Canal+ and cable networks in Poland.

The concession to broadcast a program of universal character was obtained in December 2015. In the framework of the program are mainly film and documentary series and docu-soaps and crime documentaries. The channel is headed by Radosław Sławiński, who remains the head of Polsat Play.

The channel broadcasts documentaries, natural and foreign broadcasters' reports, among others in the band beginning around 8:00 pm, with different themes on every day of the week.

Polsat Doku's programming also includes the well-known items from the Polsat channels, such as the documentary series Chłopaki do wzięcia, Kochankowie z internetu, Stołeczna drogówka, Skarby III Rzeszy by Boguslaw Wołosząski, Skazany za… or Taaaka ryba. The documentaries Na ratunek 112 and Gliniarze, Sylwester Latkowski's documentary Tajemnice polskiej mafii and an educational magazine were also presented.

On April 6, 2020 and September 30, 2021 Polsat Doku changed its logo and graphic design along with neighboring Polsat channels.

== Logo history ==
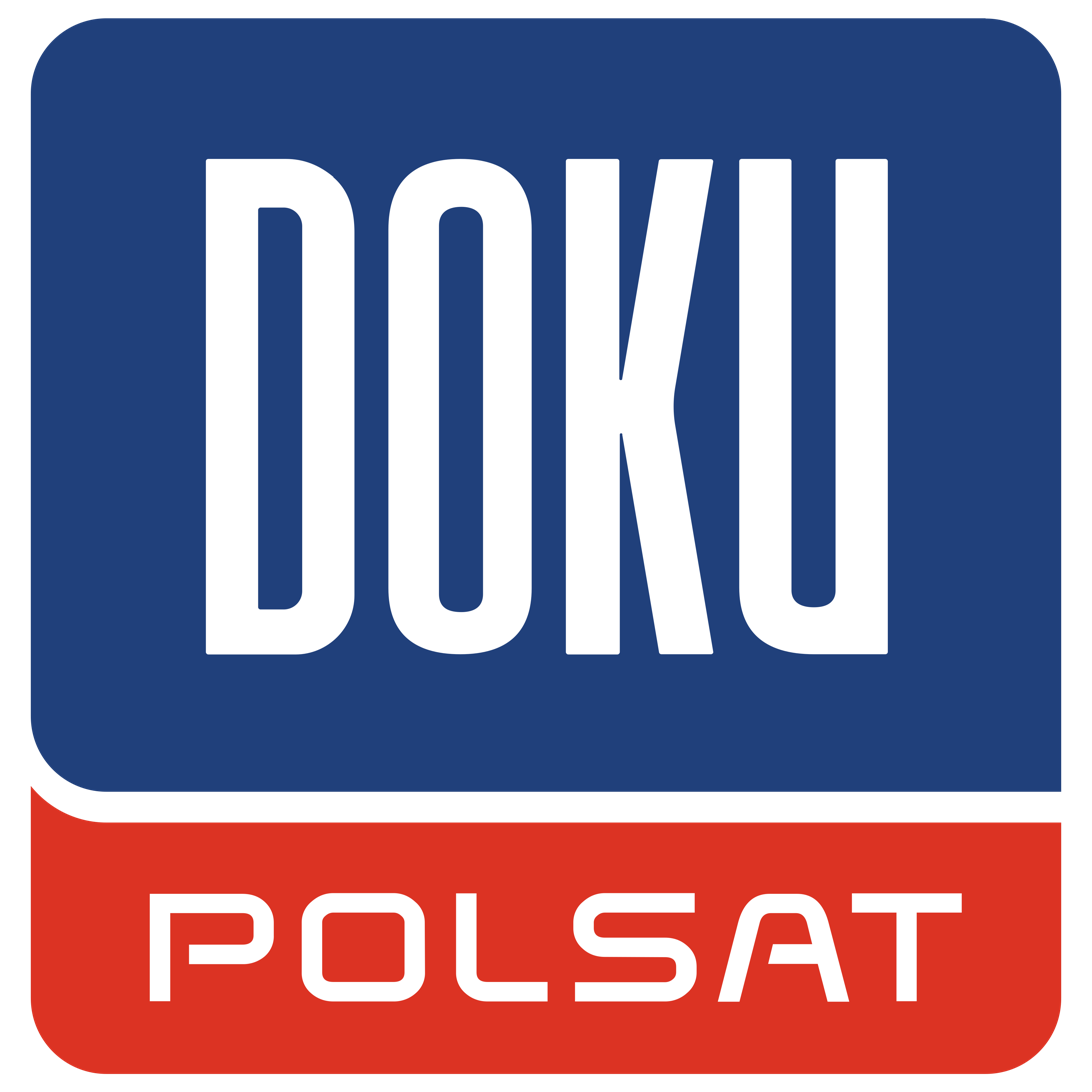
2017 – 2020	2020 - 2021	2021
