= 8TV (Poland) =

Polish television channel

- Country: Poland

Programming
- Language(s): Polish
- Picture format: 576i (16:9 SDTV); 1080i (HDTV)

Ownership
- Owner: ZPR Media Group

History
- Launched: 28 September 2016
- Closed: 16 June 2017

Links
- Website: www.se.pl/8tv

Availability

Terrestrial
- Polish Digital: MUX 1 - Channel 12 (SD)

8TV was a Polish television channel, launched on 28 September 2016. On June 16, 2017, the channel was replaced with Eska TV.
