= Polsat 2 =

Polish television channel

- Logo used since 30 August 2021
- Country: Poland
- Broadcast area: Poland
- Headquarters: Warsaw, Poland

Programming
- Picture format: 1080i HDTV (downscaled to 16:9 576i for the SDTV feed)

Ownership
- Owner: Grupa Polsat Plus
- Sister channels: Polsat; TV4; TV6; Polsat Rodzina; Super Polsat

History
- Launched: 1 March 1997
- Closed: 25 December 2015; 9 years ago (international)

Links
- Website: www.polsat2.pl

Polsat 2 is a Polish TV channel. Owned by Telewizja Polsat, it is a sister to the main Polsat channel.

== History ==
On 18 December 2015, Polsat 2 was replaced by Polsat 1 abroad and Polsat 2 remained for viewers available in Poland.

On 6 April 2020 Polsat 2 changed its logo and graphics along with other neighbouring Polsat channels.

The logo was changed again, on 30 August 2021, with the major rebranding of Polsat 2, and its television channels.

== Logo history ==
1997–2000	2002–2007	2007–2020	2020–2021	2021–present
