= Super Polsat =

Polish television channel

- Logo used since 30 August 2021
- Country: Poland
- Broadcast area: Various
- Headquarters: Warsaw, Olsztyn

Programming
- Language: Polish
- Picture format: 576i (16:9 SDTV); 1080i (HDTV)

Ownership
- Owner: Grupa Polsat Plus
- Sister channels: Polsat; Polsat 2 TV4; TV6; Polsat Rodzina

History
- Launched: 2 January 2017 (SD); 15 May 2017 (HD)

Links
- Website: www.superpolsat.pl

Super Polsat is a Polish television channel, launched on 2 January 2017. The channel provides programming with audio description and closed captioning for visually and hearing impaired.

== History ==
Super Polsat started broadcasting on 2 January 2017 on digital terrestrial television, replacing Polsat Sport News. By May 2017, it had twice the share of its predecessor, from 0.74% to 1.50%.

== Programming ==
Super Polsat broadcasts mainly light entertainment shows known from Polsat, such as talent shows (e.g. Dancing with the Stars. Taniec z gwiazdami, Must Be the Music. Tylko muzyka), reality shows (e.g. Wyspa przetrwania, Farma), TV series (e.g. Przyjaciółki, Świat według Kiepskich) and classic Polish films. A portion of programming is centred around disabilities.

Original programming include:

- Joker – game show based on Turkish Joker (2017–2018);
- Taxi kasa – game show based on British Cash Cab (2018);
- Łowcy nagród – game show based on Israeli Raid the Cage (2020);
- Pierwsza klasa – a pseudo-documentary series licensed from Dutch Brugklas (2018);
- Tatuśkowie – comedy TV series (2021);
- Miasto długów – TV series (2020);
- Kopernik była kobietą – popular science magazine (since 2020);
- SuperLudzie – documentary series about impaired people (2017–2019);
- Małe wielkie marzenia – impaired people's home makeovers (ca. 2018);
- Pozytywka SuperMagazyn – documentary series about impaired people's everyday life (ca. 2018–2019);
- Flesz Integracja – news magazine about issues of handicapped persons (2018).

From 28 August to 8 September 2024, it carried the 2024 Paralympic Games, with live coverage of the opening ceremony as well as daily highlights.

== Logos ==
2017–2020	2020–2021	2021–present
