= Polsat Café =

- Logo used since 30 August 2021
- Country: Poland

Programming
- Picture format: 16:9 576i (SDTV); 16:9 1080i (HDTV)

Ownership
- Owner: Grupa Polsat Plus
- Sister channels: Polsat; Polsat Play; Polsat Reality

History
- Launched: 6 October 2008
- Former names: Polsat Zdrowie i Uroda

Links
- Website: www.polsatcafe.pl

Polsat Café is a Polish lifestyle television channel aimed primarily at women. It is owned and operated by Polsat.

== Programmes ==
Example of programmings aired on Polsat Café:

- Szpital dziecięcy - the medical series in the world. Doctor Marta Cisek (Monika Piwek) - doctor a 1 in 3 doctors in the intro. Doctor Olga Wieczorek (Natasza Leśniak) - doctor a 2 in 3 doctors in the intro. Doctorman Paweł Wiślicki (Martin Budny) - doctor in finale in 3 doctors in the intro.
- Na zdrowie
- Zoom na miasto
- Zaskocz bliskich
- Shopping Queens: Królowe zakupów
- Botched Up Bodies
- Mała czarna
- Randki bez cenzury
- Odyseja życia
- Jak być młodym?
- Kobieta Cafe
- Looksus
- Zdrady
- Gwiazdy bez cenzury
- Grunt to rodzinka
- Baby Room
- Randka z nieznajomym
- Walka o piersi
- Café w formie
- W obiektywie Justyny Steczkowskiej
- Demakijaż
- WySPA
- Jem i chudnę
- Niebezpieczne kobiety
- Seks na weekend

== History ==
It launched on 2 August 2004. Polsat Zdrowie i Uroda Polsat Cafe on 5 October 2008 Zakończenie Programu on 6 October 2008 Rozpoczęcie Programu startu kanału 6 pażdziernika 2008 It was renamed as Polsat Café on 6 October 2008.

On April 6, 2020, On August 29, 2021, Polsat Café changed its logo and graphic design along with neighboring Polsat Cafe channels.

The logo was changed again, on August 30, 2021, with the major rebranding of Polsat Cafe, and its television channels.

== Logo ==
Logo	Date of use	Caption
	1 August 2004 – 6 October 2008	A stylized logo featuring a honeycomb design at the top; below the flower, the orange word "POLSAT" appears above a line of the same color. Beneath the line, the blue text "ZDROWIE i uroda" is written across two lines.
	6 October 2008 - 7 April 2020	The Polsat logo, but the sun is replaced by Café, the orange square is red, and the red rectangle is white.
	8 April 2020 - 29 August 2021	The previous logo, but Café is in a different font, the red square is pink, and the white rectangle is red.
	From 30 August 2021	A brand new logo with the "Polsat Globe", colored in magenta with the words "Polsat Café" below it.
