= Polsat Play =

- Logo used since 30 August 2021
- Country: Poland

Ownership
- Owner: Grupa Polsat Plus
- Sister channels: Polsat; Polsat Café; Polsat Reality

History
- Launched: 6 October 2008
- Former names: Play TV (2007–2008)

Links
- Website: https://www.polsatplay.pl/

Polsat Play is a Polish lifestyle television channel aimed primarily at men. It is owned and operated by Polsat.

== History ==
On 6 October 2008, 6 April 2020 and 30 August 2021, Polsat Play changed its logo and graphic design along with neighboring Polsat channels.

On 21 September 2012, the channel moved its on-screen graphics from the 4:3 safe area to a 16:9 widescreen placement, a change which also affected other Polsat channels.

The logo was changed again, on 30 August 2021, with the major rebranding of Polsat Play and its television channels.

Polsat Play also broadcasts some programmings from this channel.

== Programming ==
- Gliniarze
- Kołowrotek
- Magicy z ulicy
- Łowca pedofilów
- Emil pogromca mandatów
- Autościema
- Kloszard story
- Kolekcjonerzy
- Polacy za granicą
- Policjanci
- Górale
- Poszukiwacze historii
- Selekcja
- 1000 rzeczy, które mężczyzna powinien zrobić w życiu
- 120 mil na godzinę
- Przystanek Łaska
- Gadżety Salety
- Granice kariery
- Pięściarze
- Tajemnice polskiej mafii
- Terminator
- Drwale i inne opowieści Bieszczadu

== Logo ==
Logo	Date of use	Caption
	6 October 2008 - 5 April 2020	The Polsat logo, but the sun is replaced by Play from the symbol „►”.
	6 April 2020 - 29 August 2021	The previous logo, but Play is in a from the symbol „►”, there is big writing in the middle the „PLAY” is letter alfabet „P” with symbol „►”.
	From 30 August 2021	A brand new logo with the "Polsat Globe", colored in blue and grey with the words "Polsat Play" below it.
