= National Broadcasting Council =

Polish broadcasting regulator

- Krajowa Rada Radiofonii i Telewizji
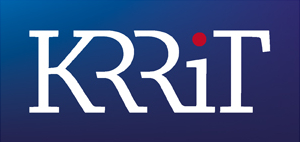

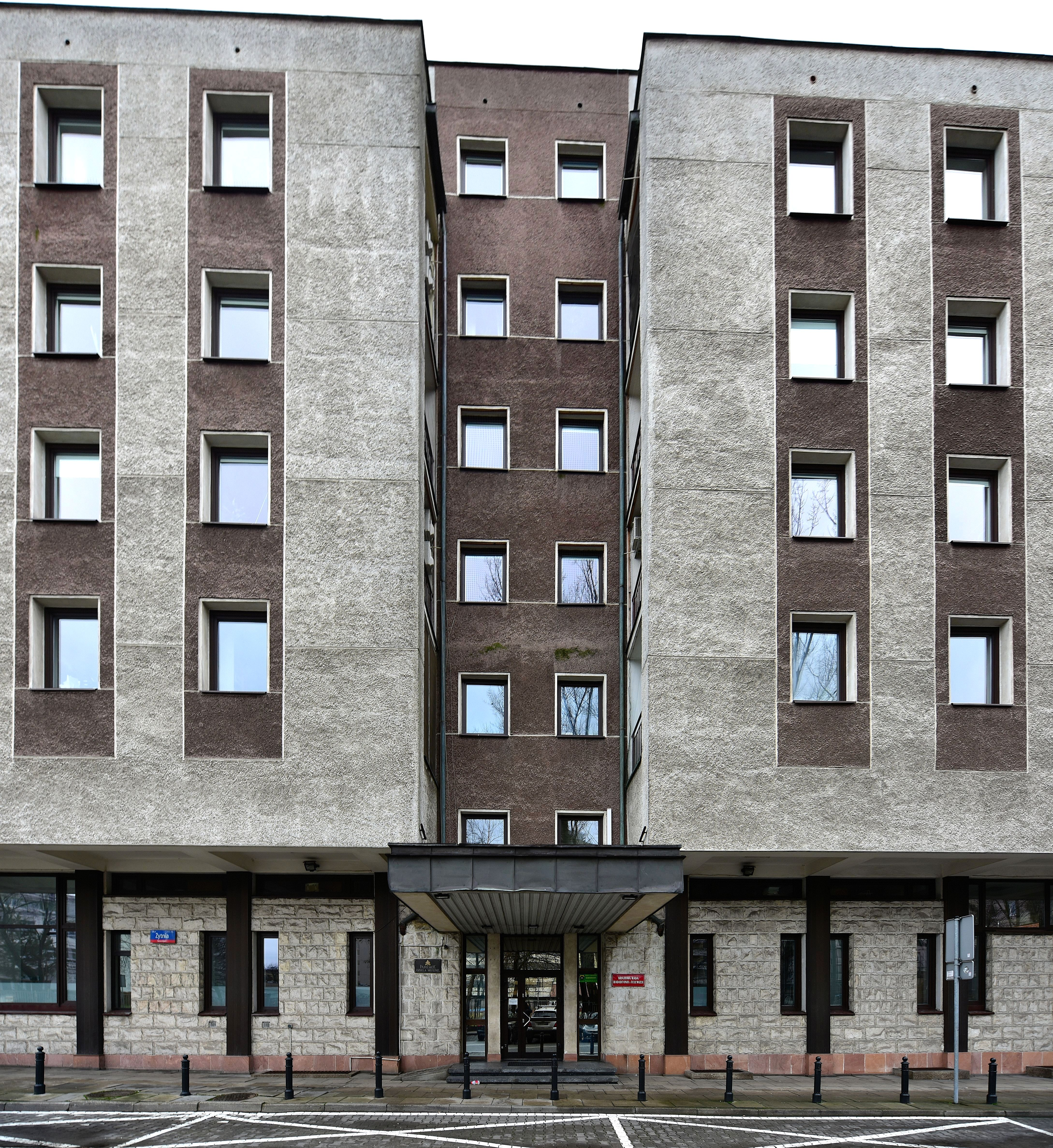
- Headquarters of the council

Agency overview
- Formed: April 28, 1993; 33 years ago
- Jurisdiction: Council of Ministers of Poland
- Headquarters: 52°14′24″N 20°58′55″E
- Employees: 147 (2017)
- Annual budget: 24.65 million PLN (2017)
- Minister responsible: Agnieszka Glapiak
- Website: gov.pl/web/krrit

The National Broadcasting Council (Polish: Krajowa Rada Radiofonii i Telewizji, KRRiT, lit. 'State Council of Radio and Television') is the Polish broadcasting regulator, which issues radio and television broadcast licenses, ensures compliance with the law by public broadcasters, and indirectly controls state-owned media. It is roughly equivalent to the Federal Communications Commission in the United States. The council is chaired by Agnieszka Glapiak, with Hanna Karp serving as vice-chair; its other members are Marzena Paczuska, Tadeusz Kowalski and Maciej Świrski.

KRRiT is an independent agency, with powers specified directly in the Polish Constitution, and members elected by the President and each of the chambers of the Parliament for 6-year terms. It was created in 1992 to manage the public media, previously tightly controlled by the state, and regulate private broadcasting, which was then emerging.

The direct constitutional empowerment, election of members for very long terms by various branches of the government, and requirement that the KRRiT members can't belong to a political party, give it very strong position, compared to similar agencies in other countries. It was considered crucial that the media be freed from political pressures.

While theoretically apolitical, members of the council were de facto appointed by the political parties, in rough proportion to their power. For a few years, because of the fragmentation of the Parliament, and ongoing conflict between the parliament and the president Lech Wałęsa, the council was in relative political balance, and so the public media weren't controlled by any particular party, while the private media were more concerned by economical expansion than politics.

However, after the victory of the post-communist Democratic Left Alliance (SLD) in the 1993 parliamentary elections, and of their candidate Aleksander Kwaśniewski in the 1995 presidential elections, the council soon became dominated by people connected to the post-communist left. Even the right-wing 1997-2001 Parliament couldn't reverse that, because of the long terms of KRRiT members and the presence of the members appointed by the President. Having won the next elections in 2001, the post-communists were able to retain control of the public media for the second part of the 1990s and the early 2000s.

The post-communist head of the public Polish Television, Robert Kwiatkowski, was widely accused of using it as a propaganda machine for the Democratic Left Alliance. Some of the early accusations include highly disproportional coverage of SLD in 1997–2001, when SLD leader Leszek Miller was given more airtime than all members of the government combined (according to some calculations), airing a documentary claiming Lech Kaczyński's involvement in the FOZZ scandal just before the elections (later found to be baseless), and a general bias in coverage of political news. KRRiT was also in constant conflict with private broadcasters, for example forbidding RMF FM to air local news.

The big problems however started only after the 2001 elections, when some members of the KRRiT were named in a conspiracy to gain control over the private media (the newspaper Gazeta Wyborcza and the TV station Polsat) by falsifying the laws (in the strand of the Lew Rywin scandal referred to as "or newspapers" (lub czasopisma, in honor of wording of the media law that was illegally switched after approval by the government), and using their broadcast licensing power to exert political and economical pressure over local private broadcasters. These events, and other corruption scandals revealed soon afterward, shattered the Polish political class. These events were all tied into a complex scandal referred to as the Rywin Affair.

In 2004 Robert Kwiatkowski was replaced by a compromise candidate, Jan Dworak, as the head of Polish Television.

== Relevant sections of the Polish Constitution ==
=== National Broadcasting Council ===
==== Article 213 ====
1. The National Broadcasting Council shall safeguard the freedom of speech, the right to information, and the public interest in radio and television broadcasting.
2. The National Broadcasting Council may issue regulations or, in individual cases, adopt resolutions.

==== Article 214 ====
1. The members of the National Broadcasting Council shall be appointed by the Sejm, the Senate and the President of the Republic.
2. A member of the National Broadcasting Council shall not belong to a political party or trade union, or perform public activities incompatible with the dignity of the office.

==== Article 215 ====
The rules and manner of operation of the National Broadcasting Council, its organization, and specific rules for appointment of its members shall be determined by statute.
