= Polsat =

Polish commercial television channel

- Logo used since 30 August 2021
- Country: Poland
- Headquarters: ul. Ostrobramska 77; 04-175 Warsaw

Programming
- Language: Polish
- Picture format: 1080i HDTV (downscaled to 16:9 576i for the SDTV feed)

Ownership
- Owner: Grupa Polsat Plus
- Sister channels: TV4; TV6; Polsat Café; Polsat Play; Polsat Doku; Polsat News; Polsat News 2 Polsat Film; Polsat Seriale

History
- Launched: 5 December 1992; 33 years ago
- Former names: PolSat (with a capital "S") (1992–1994)

Links
- Website: polsat.pl

Availability

Terrestrial
- Digital terrestrial television: Channel 4
- UPC: Channel 5
- Polsat Box: Channel 1
- Orange: Channel 5
- Vectra: Channel 105

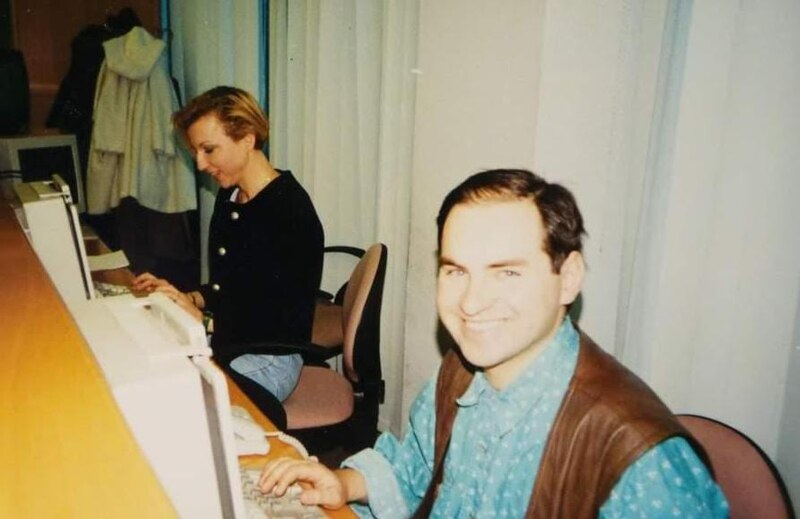
The journalists at the Polsat TV newsroom began creating, in 1993, the groundbreaking, pioneering independent news service in Central and Eastern Europe following the collapse of communism (on the photo Foreign Desk editors Pawel Maciag and Marta Bark).

Polsat is a Polish free-to-air (Note: Available free-to-air via terrestrial broadcast; it is typically included in paid packages on satellite and cable.) television channel that was launched on 5 December 1992 by Zygmunt Solorz-Żak. As of 2019, it is the most watched television channel in Poland with a market share of 11.30%

Polsat belongs to Grupa Polsat Plus (WSE: CPS), which also owns other channels.

The channel was originally based in Hilversum to circumvent the law, having studios there as well as offices in Poland. In this phase, the channel launched the first independent television news service in Central and Eastern Europe, Informacje. A ten-year license was granted to the channel in October 1993; months later it started rolling out terrestrial broadcasts and was now legally operating from Poland.

A high-definition simulcast feed of Polsat HD was available since 1 September 2009.

== History ==
=== 1992–1994 ===
When Polsat was in its planning stages, the network was practically unheard of. Network representative Piotr Nurowski together with its first head of feature films Oskar Sobański, entered the editing team of the Film magazine on 12 November 1992, with Sobański asking to its staff for a position in the new network. The following day, one of the initial members of the staff sent a package of movies for the channel, to begin planning for the 5 December launch. Alongside Zygmunt Solorz, the co-founders were Andrzej Rusko, Józef Birka, Aleksander Myszka, Wiesław Walendziak, Heronim Ruta and the deceased Piotr Nurowski. A part of them still work at Grupą Polsat Plus.

Polsat began test transmissions on 1 December 1992, and started regular broadcasts on 5 December 1992 at 16:30 CET via the Eutelsat II-F3 satellite. The first programme broadcast by Polsat was the Polish animated series Wędrówki Pyzy. It originally broadcast from a studio in Hilversum, the Netherlands, and imported programming had to come by plane (over 1,000km between the two countries) to prevent licensing issues. Its initial broadcasting reach was very small at only 20% of the population, but was considered to be attractive for advertisers, as most of its viewers were found in larger cities, had a significant overrepresentation of under-50s and had higher incomes. The owner and main founder of the channel, Zygmunt Solorz-Żak, originally planned that after the regulation of radio and television regulations, the television headquarters would be located in Wrocław, but ultimately they were located in Warsaw.

1993 was marked by firsts, the first large-scale talk show on a private television channel (Na każdy temat) premiered in October of that year, which was made popular by the introductory phrase "a helicopter has landed at the Polsat skyscraper", even though Polsat wouldn't have an actual skyscraper as its facilities until 2000. The talk show was, as the name suggested, about every topic, including taboo topics for the time. On 5 October 1993, Polsat gained a license from the National Broadcasting Council to broadcast terrestrially, as the channel was concerned about making money on satellite broadcasting alone.

A group of nine young journalists at the Polsat TV newsroom at Aleja Stanów Zjednoczonych 53 initiated the first independent news program in Central and Eastern Europe during the summer of 1993, airing live every evening as "Informacje." The core team featured journalists such as Jarosław Sellin, Pawel Maciag, Tadeusz Święchowicz, and Adam Pawłowicz. Pawel Maciag became the first-ever United States correspondent for Polsat TV based in New York City in 1999. As an eyewitness, he covered the tragic events of 9/11 from Ground Zero in New York.

In late January 1994, talks emerged of a possible buying by News International, owned by Australian-American media tycoon Rupert Murdoch, shortly after the network was awarded the right to broadcast terrestrially nationwide. No final decisions had been taken under the grounds that Murdoch was not a legal member of the consortium. Had Polsat accepted, Murdoch would take up to 33% of the shares. Polsat had said that its bid for the national license were under the grounds that its license was a "purely Polish bid with no foreign links".

=== 1994–2000 ===
In 1994, Polsat won the bid for terrestrial television broadcasting, surpassing local and international competitors, and in the summer of that year, announced that a new schedule was to be introduced that autumn, with the aim of becoming "better, more attractive and perfect", in the words of director of programming Bogusław Chrabota.

Polsat started buying in more content from more profitable international production companies, whereas TVP responded by changing its primetime schedule to be more competitive. On 17 March 1994, Gazeta Wyborcza said that, thanks to Polsat's influence, was going to air movies in the 8 pm timeslot after the main news from 1 April. It played a pivotal role in the dissemination of disco polo music thanks to Disco Relax, leading to the skyrocketing popularity of notable artists of the genre.

As the decade continued, Polsat started attracting more and more successes – both national and international. Tadeusz Drozda gained a satirical program of his own (Dyżurny Satyryk Kraju) in 1995, with 350 episodes broadcast in a period of nearly six years. There was also the game show Kalambury, where two teams guessed phrases and words based on mimics alone. The channel's first homemade TV series premiered in 1995, Próby domowe, while Informacje gained a media analysis spin-off called Sztuka Informacji, renamed Boomerang in 1998. The channel also premiered Knight Rider and Walker, Texas Ranger, both shows that became national hits. Also in 1995, the channel televised its first Miss Polonia pageant.

Polsat started a foundation in 1996 to help people in difficult situations. The channel became among the first in Poland to use virtual studios and started its own membership club (Klub Polsatu) in September of that year. From March 1997 it started airing the MegaHit slot for premiere movies on Mondays, also in the year the game show Piramida (produced with franchise owner Columbia TriStar Television), the crime prevention program Telewizyjne Biuro Śledcze and Przytul mnie premiered.

A contract was signed with executives of 20th Century Fox in Los Angeles in June 1998, enabling Polsat to become the first television station in the world to air Titanic, in a contract worth US$500,000. In September, Tok Szok moved from TVP2 to Polsat. The channel's first Polish sitcom, Miodowe lata, also premiered that year. That year was also marked by its first international co-production, the American series V.I.P. with Columbia TriStar Television. 1999 was marked by premieres of two successful local series, Rodzina zastępcza and The Lousy World.

=== 2000–2006 ===
Polsat moved to its current premises, an actual skyscraper built by Wojciech Kluk, in 2000. In May that year, Muñeca brava aired on the channel, leading to a successful visit of lead actress Natalia Oreiro to Warsaw, attracting fans to receive an autograph. In September it premiered an adaptation of the Danish interactive game show Hugo and the sitcom Adam i Ewa, with 187 episodes. On 29 December 2000 it broadcast Home Alone for the first time, becoming a cult classic in Poland in the coming years.

In March 2001, the network premiered Dwa światy, among the first Polish reality shows. Polsat moved to its current facility in 2002, at a skyscraper with a heliport on top, a dream from Na każdy temat that came into fruition. Idol, the local adaptation of Pop Idol, premiered in March. The channel started its own music festival in Sopot (TOPtrendy) in 2003.

On October 11, 2004, Informacje was replaced by the current Wydarzenia. In December, the network started airing Mikołajkowy Blok Reklamowy (Santa Claus's Commercial Break), similar to TVP1's Reklama Dzieciom, at Christmas. The proceeds of the advertisements seen in the break are handed over to treatment and rehabilitation of children.

=== 2006-2021 ===
On February 27, 2006, Polsat introduced a new identity developed by German company Velvet. The network held the first of its annual New Year's specials with its celebrities at the end of 2006, in Kraków, surpassing TVP2's equivalent, which was held that year in Wrocław. The main channel started airing Formula 1 races in 2007 at a time when Robert Kubica was competing. That same year, Polsat bought its own HD broadcasting van and started converting its channels to high definition, starting with Polsat Sport; the main channel did so at the time of UEFA Euro 2008, coinciding with the launch of Polsat News and the simultaneous relaunch of Wydarzenia. In 2009, the Moment prawdy game show premiered.

One of the 96 people killed in the Smolensk air disaster was Piotr Nurowski, who had worked with Polsat since the beginning and helped establish relations with Eutelsat in 1992. Polsat was responsible for the production of the presidential funeral, which was pooled between it, TVP and TVN. On Christmas Day 2010, Polsat aired Home Alone due to viewer requests, after excluding it from the planned Christmas schedule. The airing alone attracted 4 million viewers

Polsat rebranded again on February 27, 2019, replacing its longest-serving look after thirteen years on air.

=== 2021-present ===
At the end of 2022, information emerged that Edward Misczak had entered Grupa Polsat Plus. On January 16, 2023, he became its director of programming, replacing Nina Terentiew.

== Identity ==
The name Polsat was thought up by Polish satirist Tadeusz Drozda, at a time when the channel broadcast from the Netherlands by satellite. The first logo, made up of an S formed by two arches, and to the left the word Polsat divided in two separate syllables (with the second below the first) was designed by Jacek Błach, and the music for the ident was composed by Grzegorz Ciechowski. In 1994, after achieving its terrestrial license, the channel rebranded and adopted a sun as its logo. In an interview given to Super Express in 2011, Zygmunt Solorz-Żak was believed to be "superstitious", with the sun being created by a friend – the golden Aztec sun – to assure the success of the channel.

On 27 February 2019, the longest-running graphic design (2006–2019) was changed to a new one, and the station's logo was changed again as part of a major overhaul in 2021; however, the sun concept of the logo has remained.

=== Logo history ===
1992 - 1994	1994 - 2003	2003 - 2006 (3 versions)	2006 - 2021	2021 - present

== Programming and schedule ==
Programming

Schedule
