= Cartoon Network (Poland) =

Former Polish television channel

- Country: Poland; Czech Republic
- Broadcast area: Poland
- Headquarters: Warsaw, Poland; Prague, Czech Republic

Programming
- Languages: Polish, English
- Picture format: 1080i HDTV (downscaled to 16:9 576i for the SDTV feed)

Ownership
- Owner: Warner Bros. Discovery EMEA
- Parent: Warner Bros. Discovery Poland
- Sister channels: TVN; TVN 7; TVN24; TVN24 BiS; TVN Fabuła; TVN International; TVN International Extra; TVN Style; TVN Turbo; TTV; Cartoonito CEE; Food Network; HGTV Home&Garden; Travel Channel

History
- Launched: 17 September 1993; 33 years ago (as part of Cartoon Network Europe); 1 June 1998; 28 years ago (as independent channel)
- Closed: 18 September 2024; 2 years ago
- Replaced by: Cartoon Network CEE

Cartoon Network was a Polish television channel aimed at children, which launched in 1998 as a localized version of the eponymous American cable television channel. The channel was owned by TVN Warner Bros. Discovery, a subsidiary of Warner Bros. Discovery.

== History ==
Cartoon Network was launched in June 1998 in the country, replacing Cartoon Network UK/Europe.

On 30 September 2002, the channel began airing in Hungary and Romania, thus sharing its video feed with those countries while adding two additional audio tracks in Hungarian and Romanian.

In March 2007, Cartoon Network started broadcasting 24 hours a day. In October 2009, a separate feed of Cartoon Network was created for Hungary and Romania, while the two additional audio tracks that were previously to the channel added on 30 September 2002 were moved there. Both feeds are transmitted from Warsaw. The channel also carried a Toonami programming block between 2002 and 2006.

On 14 October 2015, Cartoon Network launched in HD.

In September 2016, Cartoon Network, along with German feed, rebranded using CHECK it 4.0 package.

On 4 June 2018, Cartoon Network aired Cartoon Network Classics block for the first time.

On 31 December 2019, Cartoon Network aired Cartoon Network Classics block for the last time.

On 1 January 2021, Cartoon Network began airing with the Czech license from RRTV.

On 18 September 2024, Cartoon Network merged with the CEE and RSEE feeds.

== See also ==
- Cartoonito (CEE)
- Cartoon Network CEE
- Cartoon Network RSEE
