= TVN Warner Bros. Discovery =

Polish media company

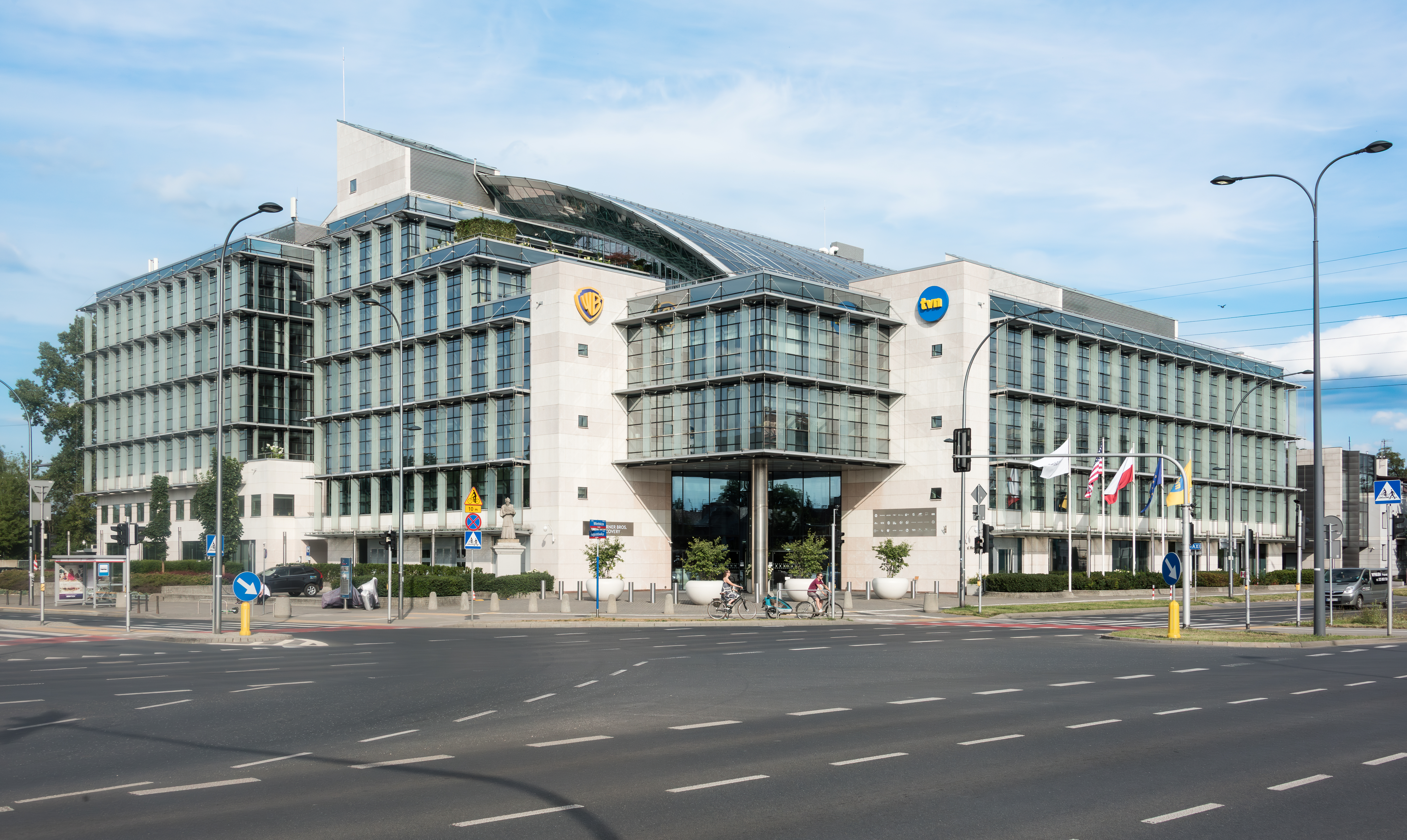
- TVN HQ in Warsaw, Poland
- Formerly: TVN Grupa Discovery (2018–2022)
- Type: Subsidiary
- Industry: Media
- Founded: 6 March 2018; 8 years ago
- Headquarters: Media Business Centre, Warsaw, Poland
- Key people: Kasia Kieli (President and CEO); Rafał Ogrodnik (CFO, COO); Dorota Żurkowska-Bytner (CRO)
- Owner: Skydance
- Parent: Discovery Networks International (2018–2022); Warner Bros. Discovery International (2022–2026); Skydance Europe and Africa (2026–present)
- Subsidiaries: TVN Group
- Website: wbdpoland.pl

TVN Warner Bros. Discovery (formerly known as TVN Grupa Discovery) is a Polish media company that, as of October 2026, operates as a subsidiary of Skydance International Networks. The business includes the assets of the TVN Group, a media company acquired by Scripps Networks Interactive, which later got bought by Discovery, Inc., and then merged with Warner Media to form Warner Bros. Discovery, which also later got bought by Paramount Skydance to form Skydance.

Originally, with the merger of WarnerMedia with Discovery, Inc., and the restructuration of its international business, the company's Polish assets, instead of being under Warner Bros. Discovery EMEA control, were left under its own subsidiary under control of Kasia Kieli, who is also a president of TVN Group.

== History ==
=== Background ===
TVN Group, a Polish media company founded on 1995, was acquired by Scripps Networks Interactive in 2015; first a 52.7% majority stake on March, and the remaining stake owned by ITI Group and Canal+ Group on July.

In December 2016, Discovery, Inc. bought a 49% stake on Metro, a recently launched television channel by Agora. In August 2017, Discovery announced that it would buy the remaining 51% stock, gaining complete ownership over the channel.

=== Establishment ===
On 6 March 2018, Scripps was acquired by Discovery, which led to the latter to expand its Polish business. Since then, Discovery merged its localized global networks under TVN Group control.

In 2022, after Discovery completed its merger with WarnerMedia, Kasia Kieli was named president for the group operations in Poland (also being named CEO of TVN Group), noting that Warner Bros. Discovery EMEA had no oversight over operations in the country, making it a separate entity under Warner Bros. Discovery International.

On 7 July 2022, Edward Miszczak, programming director at TVN since its beginnings and member of the board of directors of the company announced its departure, with a transition period in which he will be the director of the newly created programming division at TVN Warner Bros. Discovery.

== Local assets ==
TVN

- TVN Group
  - TVN
  - TVN 7
  - TVN24
    - TVN24 BiS
  - TVN Fabula
  - TVN International
    - TVN International Extra
  - TVN Style
  - TVN Turbo
  - TTV
  - Canal+ Poland (32%; with Canal+ Group and Liberty Global)
- Discovery Historia
- Metro
- DTX

== FAST assets ==
- TVN Rewolucje w Kuchni
- TVN Millionerzy
- TVN Kultowe Seriale
- TVN Rajska Miłość
- TVN Telenowele
- TVN Kryminalnie
- TVN Momenty Prawdy
- TVN Życie Jak w Bajce
- TVN Szpitalne Historie
- TVN Talk Show
- TVN Szkoła Życia
- TVN Seriale o Kobietach
- TVN W Domu
- TVN Moto
- TVN Usterka
- TVN Prawo i Życie
- TVN Pora na Show
- TVN Czas na Ślub
- TVN Kulinarne Podróże
- TVN Patrol
- TVN Puls Życia
- TVN BrzydUla

== Leadership ==
- Kasia Kieli, President & Managing Director TVN Warner Bros. Discovery and CEO TVN
- Rafał Ogrodnik, Chief Financial Officer, Chief Operating Officer
- Dorota Żurkowska-Bytner, Chief Revenue Officer
- Michał Samul, News Director
- Maciej Gozdowski, Streaming Director
- Bogdan Czaja, Programming & Operations Director
- Jarosław Potasz, Studios & Productions Director
- Dominika Stępińska-Duch, Chief Legal, Privacy and Compliance Officer
- Agnieszka Maciejewska, Chief People and Culture Officer
- Jan Mróz, Chief Communication & PR Officer
- Marcin Bogłowski, Chief Strategy, Insights and Data Officer
- Krzysztof Kozłowski, Chief Technology Officer
