= TVN Meteo =

- Country: Poland
- Broadcast area: Poland
- Network: TVN
- Headquarters: Media Business Centre; Warsaw, Poland

Programming
- Picture format: 576i (16:9 SDTV)

Ownership
- Owner: TVN Group
- Sister channels: TVN24; TVN24 BIS

History
- Launched: 10 May 2003; 23 years ago
- Replaced: TVN Meteo Active
- Closed: 15 April 2015; 11 years ago(as television channel)

Links
- Website: tvnmeteo.pl

TVN Meteo was a Polish channel dedicated exclusively to weather forecasts, it launched on May 10, 2003. It was part of the TVN network and is owned by TVN Group. Its programmes are prepared by the same weather team that presents the forecasts for TVN Meteo's sister channel TVN 24 and the group's flagship channel, TVN. It was available on most Polish cable networks.

Executives of TVN Meteo: Agnieszka Górniakowska, Agnieszka Cegielska, Maja Popielarska, Omenaa Mensah, Bartłomiej Jędrzejak, Tomasz Zubilewicz, Dorota Gardias and Hubert Radzikowski.

== History ==
TVN Meteo began broadcasting on 10 May 2003. The program included mainly thematic weather forecasts. Over the time, programmes on health, animals, plants and weather anomalies were also added to the programming.

Since March 2, 2009, the channel has been broadcasting in the 16:9 format.

From 1 August 2009 to the end of 2012, esoteric bands produced by Kosmica TV were present on TVN Meteo. From February 2013 to 2015, after a month without esoteric broadcasts, Ezo TV broadcasts came into this place. From 2016, the afternoon esoteric band was replaced by the teleshopping band Telezakupy Mango, and at night, the esoteric program Klub Magii produced by Polcast Television.

On 20 June 2011, the tvnmeteo.pl weather portal was launched. However, the official launch date was 21 June 2011. In July 2011, TVN Meteo also started broadcasting documentary programmes. From the very beginning, the station broadcast 24 hours a day.

In October 2014, two new channels were announced: TVN Fabuła, a series and film channel, and TVN Sportive dedicated to health, fitness and physical activity. In December 2014, the broadcaster applied to the Krajowa Rada Radiofonii i Telewizji to suspend the concession procedure for TVN Sportive. However, the broadcaster did not resign from the project, but it was decided to transform the weather channel into a lifestyle and sports channel under the name TVN Meteo Active. The decision was explained by the partial exhaustion of the channel's formula and falling viewing figures.

On 16 April 2015, the station underwent a rebranding and changed its name to TVN Meteo Active and received a new logo. The station combined earlier broadcast weather services with new programmes such as sports, healthy lifestyle and eating, fitness and leisure activities. However, weather forecasts were mainly issued during the night hours.

The TVN Meteo brand as a separate project was not abandoned. A separate portal TVNmeteo.pl with current weather forecast, weather information and social networking sites remained online.

In 2016, TVN announced the rebranding of TVN Meteo Active, which on 7 January 2017 was transformed into HGTV, a channel dedicated to interior design and gardening.

TVN Meteo Active was shut down on 7 January 2017. However, the broadcaster returned to TVN Meteo and a live web TV broadcast was launched, focusing entirely on the presentation of weather forecasts.
