= TVN Gra =

- Country: Poland
- Network: TVN

Programming
- Picture format: 576i (4:3 SDTV)

Ownership
- Owner: TVN Group

History
- Launched: 3 October 2005; 20 years ago
- Closed: 1 June 2008; 17 years ago

Links
- Website: www.tvngra.pl

TVN Gra was an interactive games channel that launched in March 2005 as part of the TVN network, owned by ITI Group. It featured contests, game shows and quizzes. It also used technology to allow the viewer to interact and play along at home. Series included: Rozbij Bank ("Hit the Bank"), an interactive show consisting of different letter and picture games; and Seans Filmowy ("Movie Show"), a program featuring film-based quizzes and games..

The channel closed down in 2008 due to low viewership, having survived only two years. The channels frequencies were taken by Mango 24.
