= Scripps Networks Interactive =

American media company (2008–2018)

Scripps Networks Interactive, Inc.
- Type: Public
- Traded as: Nasdaq: SNI
- ISIN: US8110651010
- Industry: Broadcasting; Digital media
- Predecessor: E. W. Scripps Company cable networks
- Founded: July 1, 2008; 18 years ago
- Defunct: March 6, 2018; 8 years ago
- Fate: Acquired by and merged into Discovery Communications
- Successors: Discovery, Inc. (2018–2022); Warner Bros. Discovery (2022–2026); Skydance (2026–present)
- Headquarters: Knoxville, Tennessee, United States
- Key people: Kenneth W. Lowe (chairman, president & CEO); Burton Jablin (president, Scripps Networks)
- Revenue: ▲US$ 2.5 billion (2013)
- Operating income: ▲US$ 958.5 million (2013)
- Net income: ▼US$ 683 million (2013) cs
- Total assets: ▲US$ 4.4 billion (2013)
- Total equity: ▲US$ 2.1 billion (2013)
- Number of employees: 3,600 (2017)

Scripps Networks Interactive, Inc. (SNI) was an American mass media company, which was formed on July 1, 2008, and acquired by and merged into Discovery Communications on March 6, 2018. Its former successors are Discovery, Inc. along with Warner Bros. Discovery and its current successor is Skydance. It was formed in 2008 through the spin-off of the E. W. Scripps Company's cable television networks and online assets. Discovery Communications completed its acquisition of SNI after receiving approval from the United States Department of Justice and European Commission on March 6, 2018. It was the owner of several major factual television cable channels, including Food Network, HGTV and Travel Channel, and operated or held stakes in localized international versions of these brands. SNI also owned Polish broadcaster TVN and half of the British channel group UKTV.

SNI was headquartered in Knoxville, Tennessee. The company had additional office locations in New York City; Los Angeles; Chicago; San Francisco; Chevy Chase, Maryland; Atlanta; Detroit; Nashville; Cincinnati; and offices in São Paulo (Brazil), London (UK) and Singapore.

== History ==
In 1994, Scripps acquired the Knoxville-based Cinetel Productions to serve as a production base for a new home lifestyle-oriented cable network, which would eventually launch in December as HGTV. Scripps later acquired a stake in the Food Network from the A.H. Belo Corporation in 1997, and launched a spin-off of HGTV known as DIY Network (now Magnolia Network) in 1999 as well as Fine Living Network (renamed as Cooking Channel in 2010) in 2002.

On October 12, 2004, the first incarnation of Scripps Networks (then a division of the E.W. Scripps Company) announced that it would acquire Great American Country (later renamed as Great American Family in 2022) from Jones Radio Network for $140 million.

On July 1, 2008, Scripps spun out its cable networks and online properties as a new, publicly traded company known as Scripps Networks Interactive. The split was performed to reduce the financial burden of Scripps' broadcast television and print assets on its profitable cable network properties.

The company acquired a majority interest in the Travel Channel from Cox Communications for a reported $975 million in late 2009, and the following year rebranded Fine Living Network as Cooking Channel.

In April 2011, the company announced the sale of Shopzilla to Symphony Technology Group for $165 million. From within its Travel Channel unit, Scripps also invested in Oyster.com, a hotel research and booking site.

In 2011, Virgin Media agreed to sell its 50% stake in UKTV to Scripps Networks Interactive for $495 million (£339 million). Completion of the transaction was contingent on regulatory approvals in Ireland and Jersey, which was received on October 3, 2011.

On March 22, 2012, Scripps Networks Interactive announced that it had agreed to pay £65m (US$102.7m) to acquire Travel Channel International Limited (TCI), the UK-based broadcaster that ran travel-themed television channels under the Travel Channel brand across the Europe, Middle East, Africa and Asia Pacific markets, but had no connection with the American television channel of the same name until that time. The deal was completed on May 1, 2012, following regulatory approval. The channels ran by TCI were rebranded after the American channel since then.

In May 2013, Scripps Networks Interactive announced that it would open a Brazilian headquarters, in São Paulo, and had appointed the former vice-president of strategy of Fox as managing director, broadcasting its channels to the entire Latin America region.

On June 5, 2013, the company launched ulive, a digital-only lifestyle video brand that combined video content from the company's media brands with third-party videos and original series. Later rebranded as Lifestyle Studios, his video portal and distribution network expanded on the company's food, home and travel verticals, adding coverage for topics including parenting and wellness.

By way of its acquisition of Polish company N-Vision, Scripps Networks Interactive gained a 52.7% controlling interest in Polish broadcaster TVN in March 2015 for $615.3 million (€584 million) from ITI Group and French media giant Vivendi. The company bought out TVN's remaining owners, ITI Group and Canal+ Group in July 2015.

On May 3, 2017, Scripps acquired millennial-targeted food website Spoon University.

=== Acquisition by Discovery ===
On July 31, 2017, Discovery Communications announced that it would acquire Scripps Networks Interactive for $14.6 billion in a cash and stock deal. Discovery will establish an operational hub in Knoxville, but the company also announced plans to relocate its worldwide headquarters from Silver Spring, Maryland to New York City in 2019.

On February 6, 2018, the European Commission approved the deal. Since Liberty Global, which operated pay television services in Poland under the UPC Polska brand, was a major shareholder in Discovery Communications, the EU required that Discovery ensure the continued availability of TVN24 and TVN24 BiS to third-party television providers.

The purchase was approved by the U.S. Department of Justice on February 27, 2018, and was completed on March 6, 2018; at that time, the company also changed its name to Discovery, Inc. SNI's chief programmer Kathleen Finch was retained as Discovery's Chief Lifestyle Brands Officer, overseeing the former SNI channels, as well as Discovery lifestyle networks such as TLC. In turn, Discovery, Inc. merged with WarnerMedia in April 2022 to form Warner Bros. Discovery; Finch was subsequently promoted to head of U.S. Networks, overseeing all non-premium cable networks run by Warner Bros. Discovery (besides Magnolia Network, which reports to HBO head Casey Bloys).

== Assets ==
=== United States ===
- Cooking Channel (70% with Tribune Media)
- DIY Network
- Food Network (70% with Tribune Media)
- Great American Country
- HGTV
- Travel Channel

=== International ===
- Asian Food Channel
- Fine Living (European TV channel)
  - Fine Living (Italian TV channel)
- TVN Group
- UKTV
