= TVN International Extra =

iTVN Extra
- Country: Poland
- Broadcast area: Worldwide, except Poland
- Network: TVN
- Headquarters: Media Business Centre; Warsaw, Poland

Programming
- Language: Polish
- Picture format: 1080i (16:9 HDTV)

Ownership
- Owner: Warner Bros. Discovery Poland
- Parent: TVN Group
- Sister channels: TVN International

History
- Launched: 4 February 2015; 10 years ago

Links
- Website: www.itvnextra.pl

TVN International Extra (iTVN Extra) is a Polish television channel belonging to the TVN Group. It is the second TV channel of TVN International addressed to Poles living abroad. It is targeted at the Polish community living in the United States, Germany, Great Britain, France, Latin America, Spain and the Caribbean. The channel is not available in Poland.

== Programming ==
The programme offer in the weekly broadcasting time between 6 a.m. and 2 p.m. includes five types of programmes: news programmes (6%), journalistic programmes (19%), documentaries (11%), entertainment programmes (5%) and other programmes (18%). Reruns of the programming will take up about 80% of the weekly transmission time.

Its entries are mainly programmes from thematic channels of ITI Neovision, TVN, TVN 7 and TTV.

== History ==
The station started broadcasting on February 4, 2015, and it is for people living abroad. On the same time of its launch, it introduced its set of graphics. The idents were similar to the main parent channel, TVN, but with a different colour scheme. The idents has its two colours blue and grey, rather than yellow and blue and five idents were used by that network, and so does him.

== Distribution ==
The channel is available in France via Numericable-SFR, in Germany via wilhelm.tel, in Great Britain via Virgin Media and in the United States via Dish Network and Sling TV. The channel is also available in Latin America, Spain and the Caribbean.
