= Mango 24 =

Mango
- Country: Poland
- Broadcast area: Poland
- Headquarters: Warsaw, Poland

Programming
- Language: Polish
- Picture format: 16:9 576i (SDTV)

Ownership
- Owner: TVO sp. z o.o. (Cyfrowy Polsat)

History
- Launched: 1 March 2002; 24 years ago (original); 9 September 2025; 8 months ago (relaunch)
- Closed: 31 July 2020; 5 years ago (original)

Links
- Website: www.mango.pl

Mango is Poland's first all-day teleshopping channel owned by TVOkazje. it was launched on March 1, 2002 it's was acquired by TVN Group in 2007. and later by Slovenian teleshopping company Studio Moderna in 2017. On July 2020, it was announced that the broadcasting of Mango 24 would be ended on July 31, 2020 as a television channel it was continued as a teleshopping block on channels like TVN and TVN7. On September 9, 2025 Mango 24 relaunched as a television channel by TVOkazje.
