= W roli głównej... =

Polish chat show

- Presented by: Magda Mołek; Piotr Najsztub (one episode)
- Country of origin: Poland
- No. of series: 8

Production
- Producer: TVN Style
- Running time: 30 minutes

Original release
- Network: TVN Style, TVN, TVN7
- Release: September 2007 – present

W roli głównej... is a Polish television chat show presented by journalist Magda Mołek. Each programme is an interview with one special celebrity guest. The talks are often intimate and emotionally charged.

== Episodes ==
=== Series 1 ===
No. overall	No. in series	Guest
1	1x01	Piotr Najsztub
2	1x02	Małgorzata Niezabitowska
3	1x03	Aleksander Wolszczan
4	1x04	Irena Eris
5	1x05	Robert Więckiewicz
6	1x06	Dorota Zawadzka
7	1x07	Justyna Steczkowska
8	1x08	Agnieszka Holland
9	1x09	Ilona Łepkowska

=== Series 2 ===
No. overall	No. in series	Guest	Original release date
10	2x01	Joanna Chmielewska	4 March 2008
11	2x02	Dorota Wellman	11 March 2008
12	2x03	Kayah	18 March 2008
13	2x04	Małgorzata Braunek	25 March 2008
14	2x05	Marek Kondrat	1 April 2008
15	2x06	Paweł Małaszyński	8 April 2008
16	2x07	Kuba Wojewódzki	15 April 2008
17	2x08	Magdalena Środa	22 April 2008
18	2x09	Sebastian Karpiel-Bułecka	29 April 2008
19	2x10	Iwona Szymańska-Pavlović	6 May 2008
20	2x11	Maryla Rodowicz	13 May 2008
21	2x12	Katarzyna Figura	20 May 2008
22	2x13	Marcin Meller	27 May 2008
23	2x14	Bożena Dykiel	
24	2x15	Ewa Minge	3 June 2008
25	2x16	Sharon Stone	10 June 2008

=== Series 3 ===
No. overall	No. in series	Guest
26	3x01	Tomasz Jacyków
27	3x02	Joanna Senyszyn
28	3x03	Agnieszka Chylińska
29	3x04	Anna Maria Wesołowska
30	3x05	TBA
31	3x06	Anna Głogowska
32	3x07	Michał Wiśniewski
33	3x08	Robert Kozyra
34	3x09	Mateusz Kusznierewicz
35	3x10	Agnieszka Perepeczko
36	3x11	Sonia Bohosiewicz
37	3x12	Wojciech Fibak
38	3x13	Tomasz Raczek
39	3x14	Ewa Kasprzyk
40	3x15	Kasia Kowalska
41	3x16	Katarzyna Cichopek
42	3x17	No guest (The Best of series 3)

=== Series 4 ===
No. overall	No. in series	Guest
43	4x01	Tomasz Karolak
44	4x02	Izabella Miko
45	4x03	Michał Piróg
46	4x04	Maria Peszek
47	4x05	Andrzej Piaseczny
48	4x06	TBA
49	4x07	Dariusz Michalczewski
50	4x08	Shazza
51	4x09	Piotr Rubik

=== Series 5 ===
No. overall	No. in series	Guest
52	5x01	Katarzyna Dowbor
53	5x02	Weronika Rosati
54	5x03	Olivier Janiak
55	5x04	Anna Mucha
56	5x05	Mandaryna
57	5x06	Martyna Wojciechowska
58	5x07	Krzysztof Ibisz
59	5x08	Katarzyna Grochola

=== Series 6 ===
No. overall	No. in series	Guest	Original release date
60	6x01	Monika Richardson	1 March 2010
61	6x02	Anita Werner	8 March 2010
62	6x03	Katarzyna Montgomery	15 March 2010
63	6x04	Urszula Kasprzak	22 March 2010
64	6x05	Bogusław Linda	29 March 2010
65	6x06	Natalia Kukulska	5 April 2010

=== Series 7 ===
No. overall	No. in series	Guest	Original release date
66	7x01	Trinny Woodall & Susannah Constantine	6 September 2010
67	7x02	Aleksandra Kwaśniewska	13 September 2010
68	7x03	Jarosław Kuźniar	20 September 2010
69	7x04	Magda Gessler	27 September 2010
70	7x05	Mateusz Damięcki	4 October 2010
71	7x06	Robert Korzeniowski	11 October 2010
72	7x07	Marcin Prokop	18 October 2010
73	7x08	Magda Mołek (presented by Piotr Najsztub)^{1}	25 October 2010
This was meant to be the last episode of the show as Mołek decided to leave it, though after much protest by viewers, the programme was renewed for its eight series a few months later.

=== Series 8 ===
No. overall	No. in series	Guest	Original release date
74	8x01	Janusz Józefowicz	7 November 2011
75	8x02	Wojciech Mecwaldowski	14 November 2011
76	8x03	Alicja Janosz	21 November 2011
77	8x04	Karolina Korwin-Piotrowska	28 November 2011
78	8x05	Małgorzata Kożuchowska	5 December 2011
79	8x06	Maja Sablewska	12 December 2011

=== Series 9 ===
No. overall	No. in series	Guest	Original release date
80	9x01	Szymon Hołownia	5 March 2012
81	9x02	Beata Kozidrak	12 March 2012
82	9x03	Jan Englert	19 March 2012
83	9x04	TBA	26 March 2012

=== Special episodes ===
No. overall	No. in series	Guest	Original release date
1	Sp.x01	Edyta Górniak	17 May 2010
