= Artur Andrus =

Polish journalist and singer (born 1971)

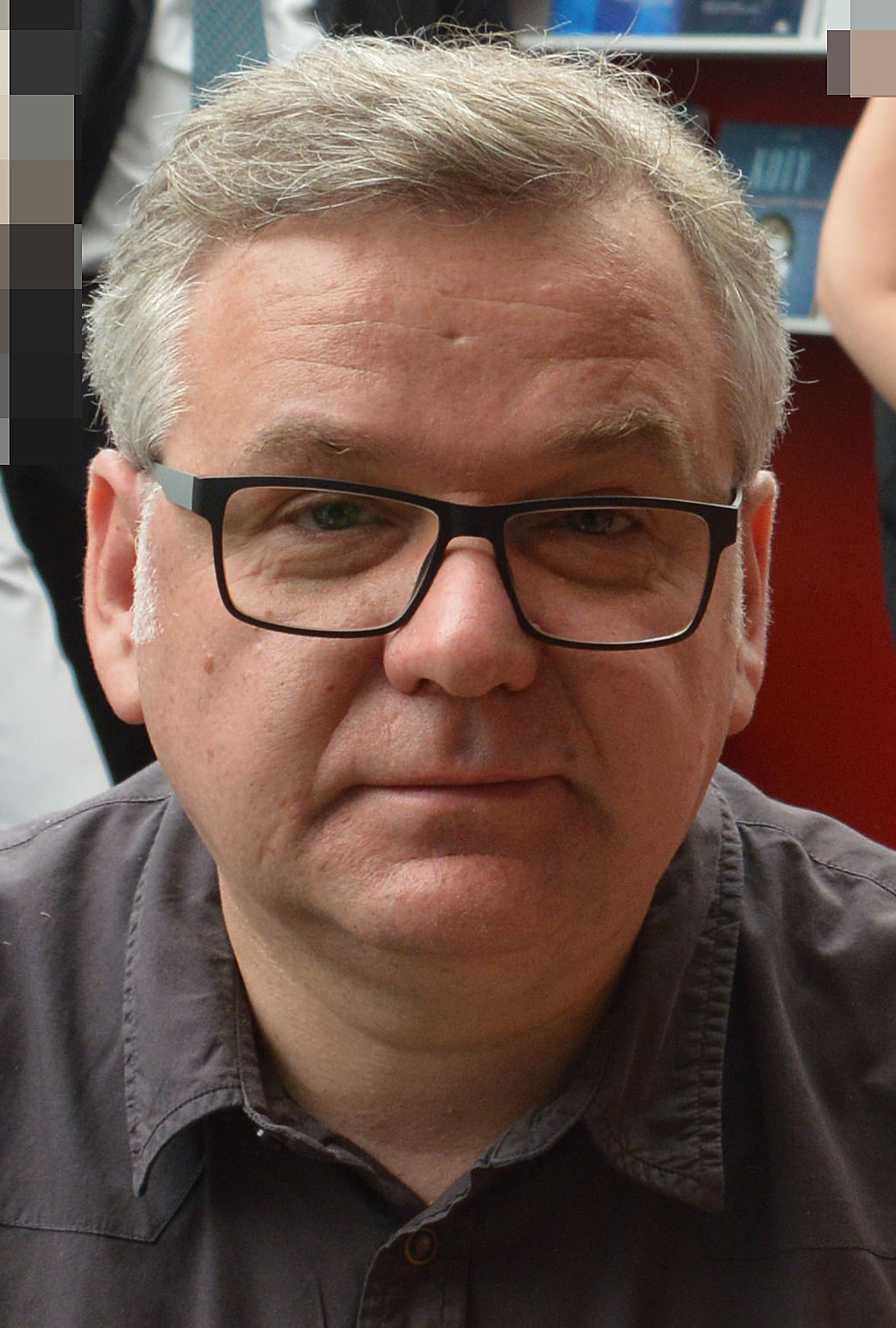
- Born: Artur Józef Andrus; 27 December 1971 (age 54); Lesko, Poland
- Education: University of Warsaw
- Occupations: journalist, poet, singer-songwriter, cabaret artist, master of ceremonies
- Awards: Gold Cross of Merit; Silver Cross of Merit
- Website: arturandrus.art.pl

Artur Józef Andrus (born 27 December 1971) is a Polish journalist, poet, singer-songwriter and cabaret artist. He is best known for his radio shows at Polskie Radio Program III, and as a master of ceremonies during various TV shows.

Andrus has published three books and released three albums. His 2012 album Myśliwiecka debuted at number 1 at Polish albums chart and was certified 2× Platinum in Poland. Andrus is a recipient of Gold Cross of Merit (2011) and Silver Cross of Merit (2005).

== Career ==
Artur Andrus studied journalism at Warsaw University. He worked at Rozgłośnia Harcerska and Radio Rzeszów. His breakthrough was an interview with poet and singer Wojciech Młynarski, during which Andrus was rhyming when asking questions, and Młynarski was answering with improvised rhymes. After that, Andrus received an offer to run a radio show on Polskie Radio Program IV. Since 1994, he has worked in Polskie Radio Program III in "Powtórka z rozrywki" and "Akademia rozrywki" shows.

In December 2004, Andrus published a collection of songs and poems titled Popisuchy. Since 2005, he has been a commentator on a satirist TVN 24 show Szkło kontaktowe. On 2 December 2005, he released his first album, Łódzka.

In 2008, Polityka magazine released a set of 15 DVDs titled Kolekcja polskich kabaretów (A Collection of Polish Cabarets), which contained various cabaret performances selected by Andrus. That year, Andrus also starred in TV series Rodzina Trendych on TVP 2, and in an improvised soap opera parody Spadkobiercy, which was broadcast on Polsat from 2008 to 2009, and on TV 4 from 2009 to 2012.

In 2011, his second book, Każdy szczyt ma swój Czubaszek (an interview with Polish satirist Maria Czubaszek), was published.

In 2012, Andrus published a collection of his blog posts, Blog osławiony między niewiastami, and released his second studio album Myśliwiecka, which became a commercial success. The album debuted at number 1 on Polish Albums Chart, held that position for a total number of twelve weeks, and was certified 2× Platinum.

On 22 April 2012, Andrus' concert in Teatr Syrena in Warsaw was filmed, and released in April 2013 on a DVD titled Piłem w Spale... I co dalej?. The album debuted at number 5 on the Polish chart.

== Publications ==
- Popisuchy (2004, ISBN 83-7415-047-5)
- Każdy szczyt ma swój Czubaszek (2011, with Maria Czubaszek, ISBN 978-83-7648-950-6)
- Blog osławiony między niewiastami (2012, ISBN 978-83-7839-138-8)

== Discography ==
=== Studio albums ===
Title	Album details	Peak chart positions	Certifications
Title	Album details	POL	Certifications
Łódzka	Released: 2 December 2005; Label: Wyższa Szkoła Promocji/EMI; Formats: CD	—	
Myśliwiecka	Released: 5 March 2012; Label: Mystic Production; Formats: CD, digital download	1	ZPAV: 2× Platinum
Cyniczne Córy Zurychu	Released: 26 March 2015; Label: Mystic Production; Formats: CD, digital download	2	ZPAV: Platinum
Sokratesa 18	Released: 20 April 2018; Label: Mystic Production; Formats: CD, digital download	7	ZPAV: Gold

=== Live albums ===
Title	Album details	Peak chart positions
Title	Album details	POL
Piłem w Spale... I co dalej?	Released: 15 April 2013; Label: Mystic Production; Formats: CD+DVD, DVD, Blu-Ray, digital download	5
