= TVN Style =

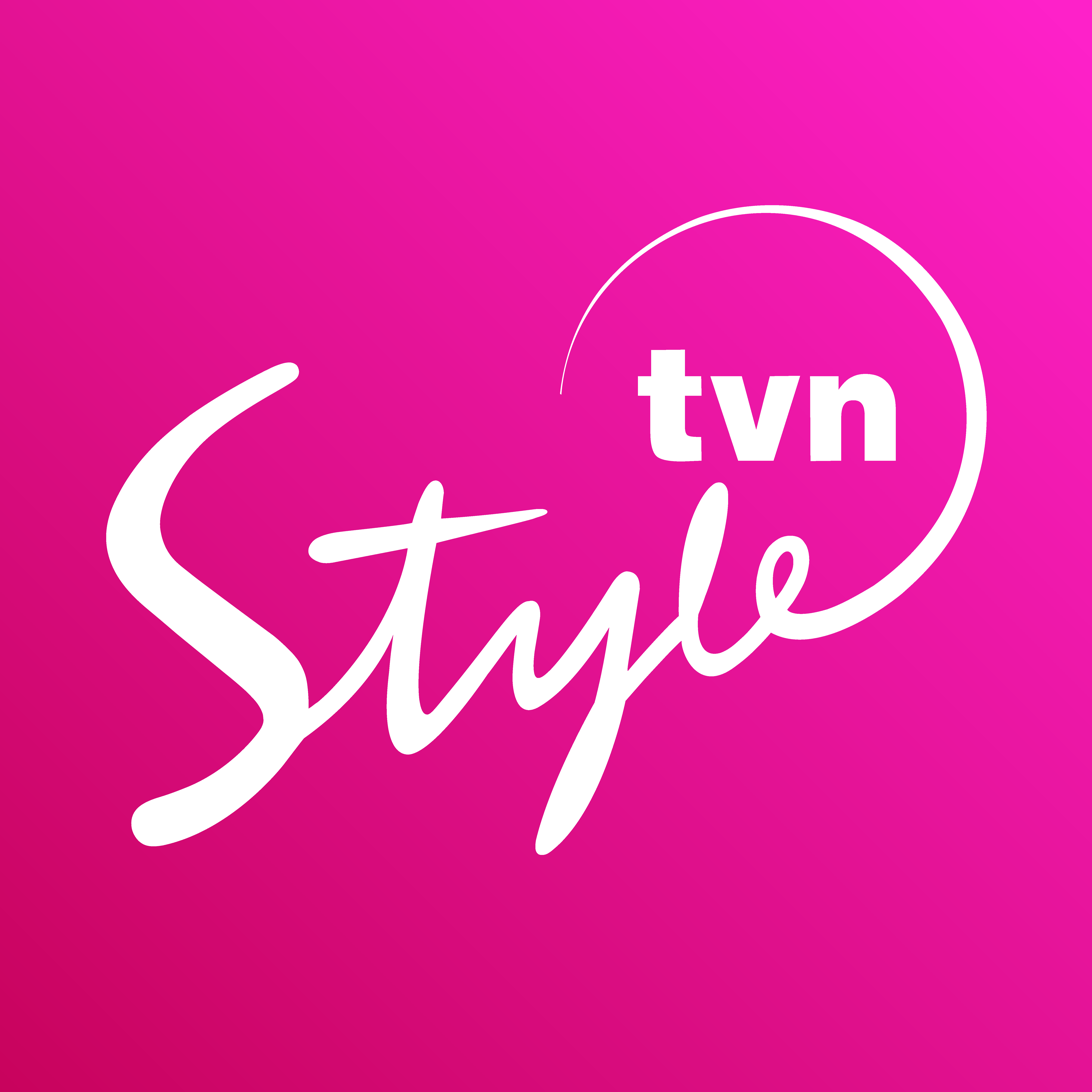
- Country: Poland
- Broadcast area: Poland
- Network: TVN
- Headquarters: Media Business Centre; Warsaw, Poland

Programming
- Picture format: 576i (SDTV) 16:9; 1080i (HDTV)

Ownership
- Owner: Warner Bros. Discovery Poland
- Parent: TVN Group
- Sister channels: TVN Turbo

History
- Launched: 1 August 2004; 22 years ago

Links
- Website: tvnstyle.pl

TVN Style is a Polish pay-TV channel aimed at women featuring the latest in fashion, health and beauty. It was first launched on 1 August 2004 and a part of the TVN network, owned by Warner Bros. Discovery.

== Line-up ==
- Miasto kobiet (City of women) - a daily talk-show about women's issues
- Lekcja stylu (Lesson of Style) - a show about style, how to look and act
- Salon piękności (The Beauty Salon) - a magazineshow about beauty care
- WF (PE) - a gymnastic show
- Zaklinacze wnętrz (The House Doctor)
- Notes Kulinarny (Cooking Note-book) - a cooking show
- Przeglądarka (Browser)
- Co za tydzień (What a Week) - a magazineshow about weekly news (mainly in fashion and movies)
- Telewizja od kuchni (TV. Making of) - a show about working in TV
- Maja w ogrodzie (Maya in the garden) - a show about gardens, how to make them beautiful, how to create good flower compositions, and how to take care about your garden
- Zielone drzwi (The Green Door)
- Biografie (Biographies) - a show about famous people
- Kto tu rządzi? (Who's the boss now?)
- Ona czyli ja (She or me)
- Mamo już jestem (Mom, I'm here)
- I ty możesz mieć super dziecko (You too can have SuperBaby) - a talkshow for parents how to take good care of children
- Superniania - a show about woman who comes to desperated parents houses, and helps them take care of very naughty children
- W roli głównej... - Polish television chat show
- 101 powodów dlaczego kochamy lata 90. (101 reasons for why we love the 90s.)
- Przytulaki (Hug Friends) - an animation for children in young age (airing mainly in 6 am)
- Bądź zdrowa (Be healthy) - a show about healthy eating and taking care of your body
- Seks inspektorzy (Sex inspectors)
- Coś więcej, niż cztery ściany (Something more than four walls) - a show about houses, how to make them look good, and buy suitable furniture
- Wiem co jem

== Presenters ==
=== Current ===
- Jolanta Kwaśniewska
- Wojciech Cejrowski
- Klaudia Carlos
- Magda Mołek
- Katarzyna Bosacka
- Anna Maruszeczko
- Dorota Zawadzka
- Karolina Korwin-Piotrowska
- Paulina Smaszcz
- Dorota Wellman
- Joanna Racewicz
- Omenaa Mensah
- Paulina Młynarska
- Weronika Marczuk-Pazura
- Tomasz Kin
- Olga Kuźniak
- Anna Orłowska-Filasiewicz

=== Previous ===
- Marzena Rogalska (Current TVP 2)
- Iwona Radziszewska
- Beata Tadla (Current Fakty TVN i TVN24)
- Marta Kuligowska (Current TVN24)
- Sylwia Paszkowska
- Joanna Brodzik
- Karolina Malinowska
- Beata Sadowska (Current TVP2)
- Anna Dziewit
- Katarzyna Montgomery (Current TV 4)
- Joanna Horodyńska (Current VH1 Polska)
- Monika Tarka-Kilen (Current Radio WAWA)

== Logos ==
2004 – 2011

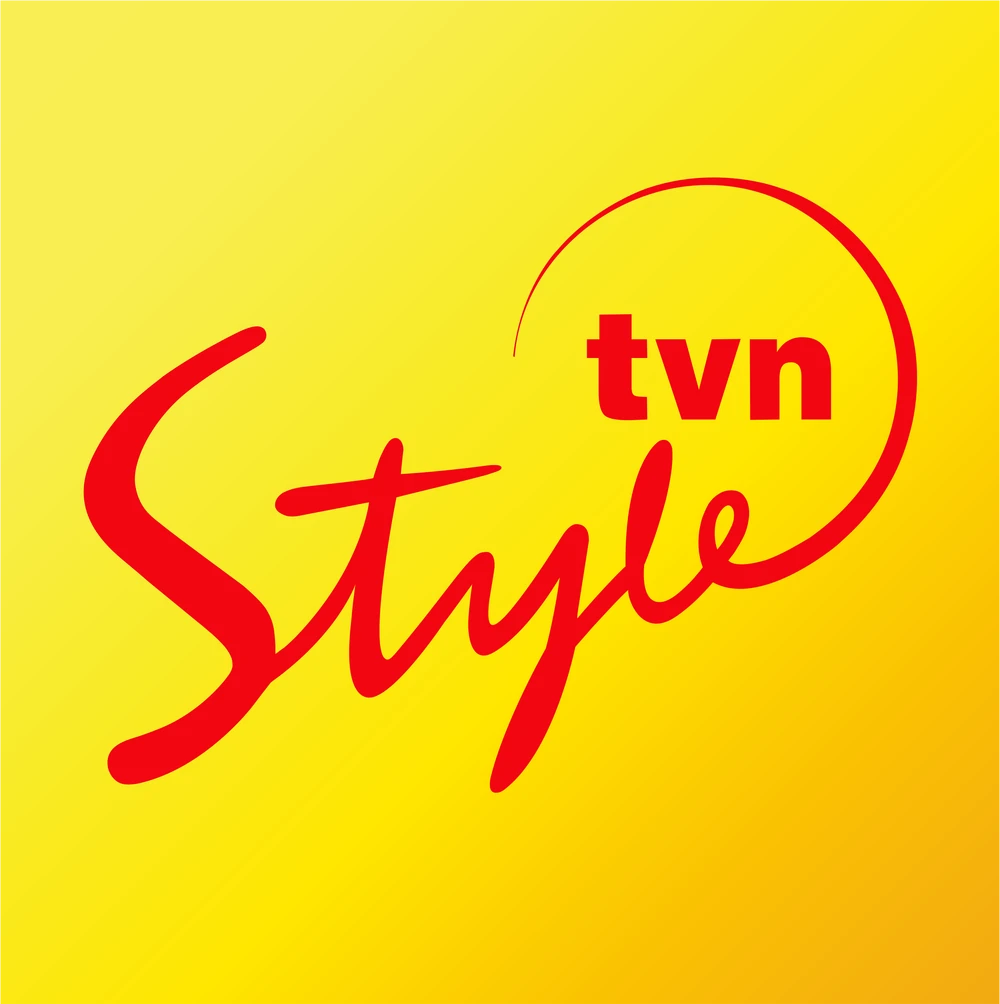
2011 – 2014

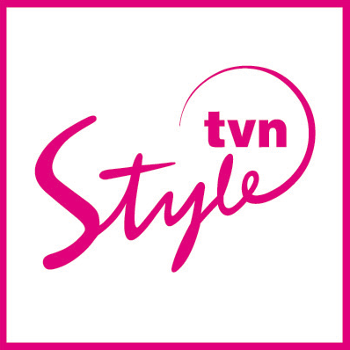
2014 – 2023

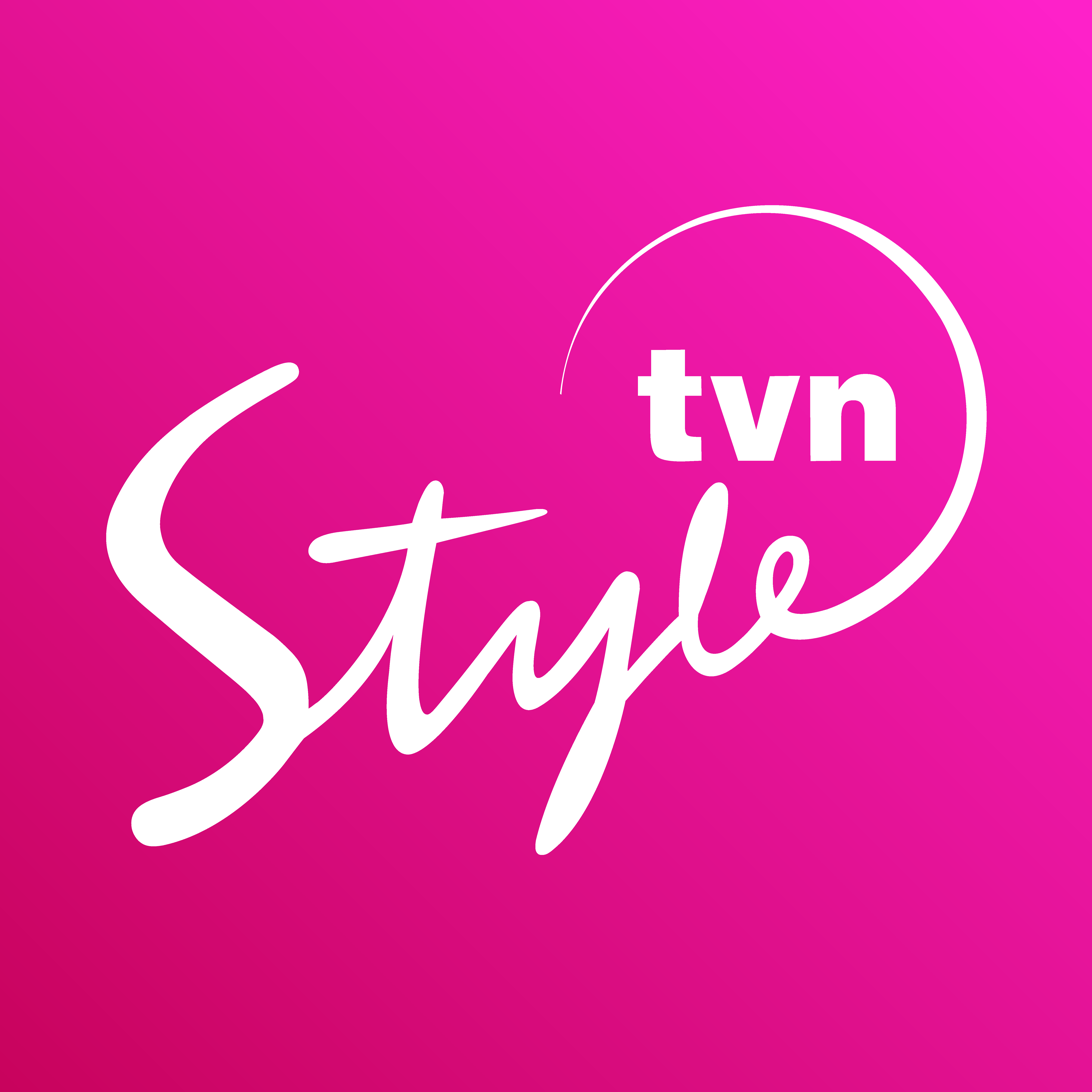
2023
