= Jan Wejchert =

Polish businessman (1950–2009)

- Born: 5 January 1950; Warsaw, Poland
- Died: 31 October 2009 (aged 59); Zurich, Switzerland
- Resting place: Wilanów Cemetery, Warsaw, Poland
- Education: University of Warsaw
- Occupation: Businessman
- Spouse: Aldona Wejchert
- Children: Bruno Jan Wejchert; Agata Dworniak-Wejchert; Victoria Wejchert; Jan Łukasz Wejchert; Charlotte Wejchert
- Parent: Jan Wejchert

Jan Bohdan Wejchert (Polish pronunciation: [ˈjan ˈbɔɣdan ˈvɛjxɛrt]; 5 January 1950 – 31 October 2009) was a Polish businessman and media mogul. He had a net worth of $1.3 billion (Forbes) Wejchert was the co-founder of the ITI Group, one of Poland's largest media groups, as well as the co-founder and co-owner of the TVN television network. He was also the 4th richest Pole.

== Biography ==
=== Early career ===
Wejchert graduated from the Economics Faculty of the University of Warsaw. In 1974, Wejchert began his career as a businessman by working for Konsuprod, GmbH & Co., a German trading company. Wejchert later incorporated the new Polish subsidiary of Konsuprod in 1976, the first instance of direct foreign investment in Poland, which was under Communist rule.

=== Career ===
Wejchert co-founded the ITI Group in 1984 with businessman, Mariusz Walter. Wejchert became the ITI Group's first president and founding shareholder. He ran ITI in a partnership with Walter and Bruno Valsangiacomo. He later co-founded and co-owned both the TVN television network and TVN 24 television networks. He sat on the management board of TVN.

He was also the co-owner and deputy president of the Onet.pl group. Additionally, Wejchert co-owned the Legia Warszawa football club. He also sponsored the construction of the Temple of Divine Providence in Wilanów, Poland where he was supposed to be buried after his death.

In 1991, he was appointed to the US-Poland Action Commission, which was headed by Zbigniew Brzezinski. Wejchert was a co-founder of the Polish Business Roundtable, a business club, and served as the organization's first president. In 1998, Wejchert was awarded the Order of Polonia Restituta cross for creating one of the first private TV channels in Poland, TVN Group. The Polish Business Roundtable is headquartered at the Sobański Palace, a 19th-century Warsaw townhouse owned by Wejchert since 1996. Wejchert restored the townhouse in the late 1990s. In 2008, Jan Wejchert was ranked as the 9th most influential pole by the Przegląd magazine. He was also noted as one of the richest poles by the Forbes magazine, with a peak net worth of $1.3 billion, for over a decade. In 2008, he was ranked 897th on the Forbes list of billionaires (2008), with a net worth of $1.3 billion. In 2018, Wejchert was ranked the 16th richest pole of the last 100 years by Wprost magazine. He was also ranked the 19th richest Pole of the last 30 years in 2019 by Wprost magazine, with a peak net worth of 4,5 billion polish złotys.

Wejchert also purchased Stara Papiernia, a suburban Warsaw paper mill which was destroyed by fire in 1984. He restored Stara Papiernia and reopened the building, incorporating it into a shopping center in November 2002. He was also the owner of Sobański Palace in Warsaw and Pałacyk Wielopolskich w Warszawie, both located in the polish al. Ujazdowskie. Before his untimely death, Wejchert bought an enormous piece of land in Brześce, Poland where he started the construction of Wejchert Golf Club, which was supposed to be the biggest golf course in Poland worth over 250mln złoty. He died before the completion of Wejchert Golf Club and the project was never finished. The land remains unused to this day and is sculpted in the shape of a golf course.

=== Personal life ===
Wejchert was a resident of Konstancin-Jeziorna, a suburb of Warsaw. He was married 3 times, and had five children. His eldest son Jan Łukasz Wejchert worked alongside Wejchert, as Ceo of Onet.pl, which was part of Jan Wejcherts media company ITI Group.

Jan Wejchert died on 31 October 2009, at the age of 59. Wejchert had fought leukemia since 1993, which he had kept secret from the public. However, the cause of his death was a heart attack due to an infection and sepsis. After his death, the Polish Business Roundtable honoured him by creating the prestigious Jan Wejchert Award, which in polish is the Nagroda Polskiej Rady Biznesu imienia Jana Wejcherta.

== Place on the list of the richest Poles by Wprost Magazine ==
- 2011 y. – rank 7. (2,421 billion Wejchert Family
- 2010 y. – rank 11. (2,6 billion
- 2009 y. – rank 4. (4,6 billion
- 2008 y. – rank 12. (3,4 billion
- 2007 y. – rank 8. (3,6 billion
- 2006 y. – rank 6. (3 billion)
- 2005 y. – rank 10. (1,5 billion
- 2004 y. – rank 7. (1,4 billion
- 2003 y. – rank 6. (1,35 billion
- 2002 y. – rank 5. (1,9 billion
- 2001 y. – rank 14.
- 2000 y. – rank 7.
- 1999 y. – rank 9.
- 1998 y. – rank 9.
- 1997 y. – rank 16.
- 1996 y. – rank 24.
- 1995 y. – rank 21.
- 1994 y. – rank 10.
- 1993 y. – rank 11.
- 1992 y. – rank 3.
