= TVN Group =

Polish media company

TVN S.A.

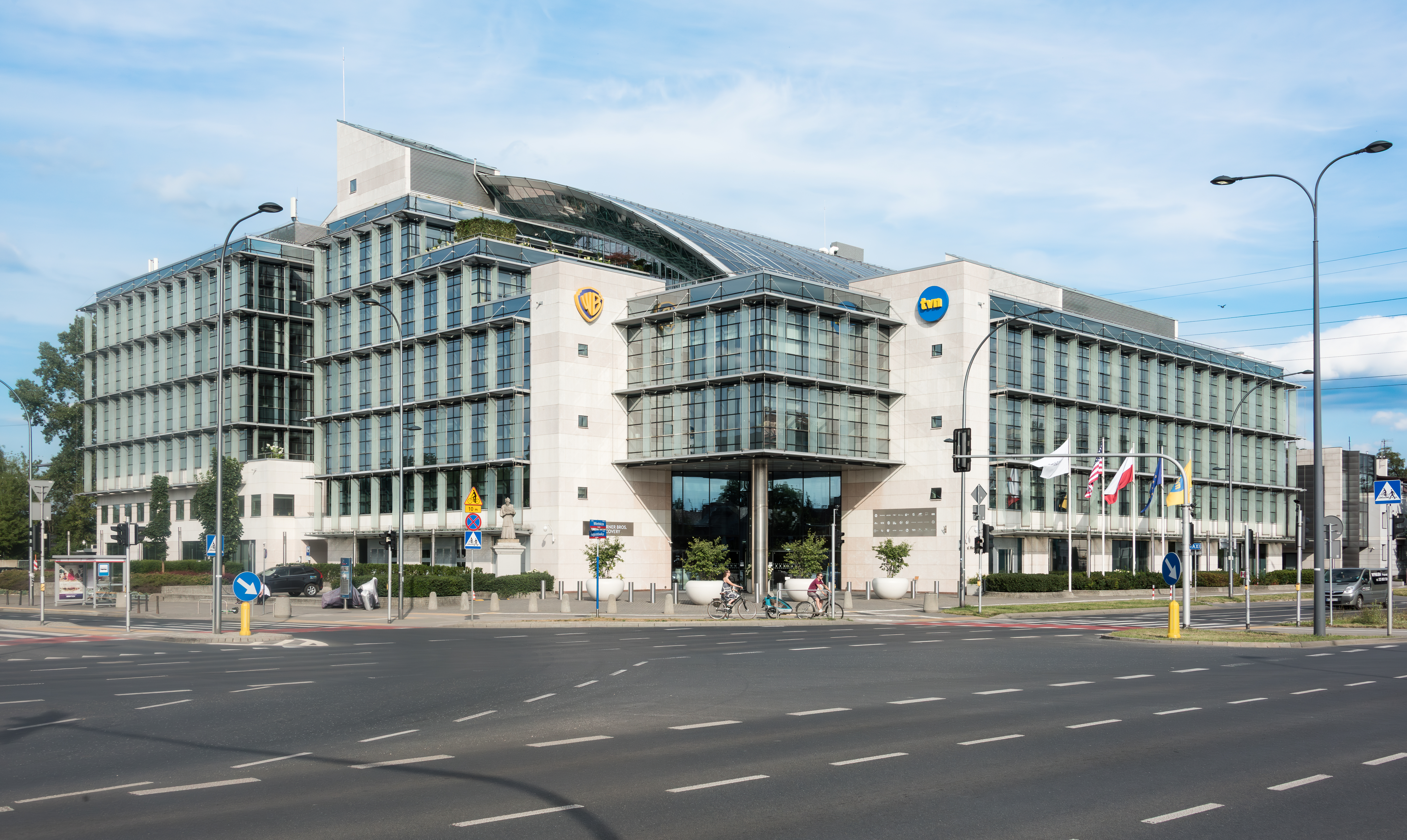
- TVN HQ in Warsaw, Poland
- Trade name: Grupa TVN
- Formerly: TVN Sp. z o.o.
- Type: Division
- Industry: Mass media; Entertainment
- Founded: 1995; 31 years ago
- Founders: Jan Wejchert; Mariusz Walter; Bruno Valsangiacomo
- Headquarters: Media Business Centre, Warsaw, Poland
- Key people: Kasia Kieli (CEO); Rafał Ogrodnik (CFO, COO); Michal Samul (News Director; Dorota Żurkowska-Bytner (CRO)
- Products: TV shows FAST channels Web portals Video production Digital media
- Brands: TVN; TVN 7; TVN24; TVN24 BiS; TVN Fabuła; TVN International; TVN International Extra; TVN Style; TVN Turbo; TTV
- Services: Broadcasting; Publishing; Streaming; Television
- Parent: TVN Warner Bros. Discovery
- Divisions: TVN Media; TVN News and Services Agency
- Subsidiaries: Canal+ Polska (32%); Polski Operator Telewizyjny (50%); Stavka
- Website: tvn.pl; player.pl

TVN S.A. (trade name: Grupa TVN) is a Polish media and entertainment group established in 1995 as TVN Sp. z o.o. The CEO of TVN Group is Katarzyna "Kasia" Kieli, president and managing director of TVN Warner Bros. Discovery. Its TV channel, TVN, is their flagship.

In 2004, with its debut on the Warsaw Stock Exchange, the company became a public limited company. In March 2015, U.S. broadcaster Scripps Networks Interactive bought a 52.7% majority stake in TVN for €584 million. In July 2015, SNI bought out TVN's remaining owners, ITI Group and Canal+ Group, for €584 million, giving it full ownership.

On March 6, 2018, SNI was, in turn, acquired by Discovery, Inc. for US$14.6 billion. Liberty Global, which operated pay television provider UPC Polska, is a major shareholder in Discovery. The European Commission thus required TVN to ensure that TVN24 and TVN24 BiS remain available to third-party television providers.

== Assets ==
=== TV Channels ===
- TVN (HD)
- TVN 7 (HD)
- TVN24 (HD)
- TVN24 BiS (HD)
- TVN Fabuła (HD)
- ITVN
- ITVN Extra
- TVN Style (HD)
- TVN Turbo (HD)
- TTV (HD)
- Metro (HD)
- HGTV (HD)

=== FAST Channels ===
- TVN Rewolucje w Kuchni
- TVN Millionerzy
- TVN Kultowe Seriale
- TVN Rajska Miłość
- TVN Telenowele
- TVN Kryminalnie
- TVN Momenty Prawdy
- TVN Życie Jak w Bajce
- TVN Szpitalne Historie
- TVN Talk Show
- TVN Szkoła Życia
- TVN Seriale o Kobietach
- TVN W Domu
- TVN Moto
- TVN Usterka
- TVN Prawo i Życie
- TVN Pora na Show
- TVN Czas na Ślub
- TVN Kulinarne Podróże
- TVN Patrol
- TVN Puls Życia
- TVN BrzydUla

=== Online services ===
- Player.pl (On demand service)
- TVN24.pl
- TVN24 GO (On demand service)
- Kontakt 24
- TVN Warszawa
- TVN Meteo
- TVN Zdrowie

=== Satellite platform ===
- Canal+

=== Former ===
- TVN +1
- TVN 24 International
- Telewizja Wisła
- TVN Wisła / TVN Południe (programming dedicated to Southern Poland (HQ in Kraków), merged with TVN in 2001)
- TVN Północ (programming dedicated to Northern Poland (HQ in Gdańsk), ceased broadcasting around 2000)
- TVN Łódź (programming dedicated to Łódź region, ceased broadcasting around 2000)
- TVN Warszawa (channel dedicated to the region of Warsaw, showing news and other programmes, now available only as internet webpage).
- TVN Gra ('game' or 'play'; channel only showing interactive game and quiz shows)
- TVN Meteo Active (channel focused on active, healthy lifestyle, recreation, fitness and rational nutrition; transformed from TVN Meteo)
- TVN Meteo
- TVN Lingua (channel dedicated to learning languages)
- TVN Med (a channel oriented towards physicians, which was only available to licensed practitioners)
- Discovery TVN Historia (at present Discovery Historia, history channel produced with Discovery Channel)
- TVN CNBC (business channel produced with CNBC Europe)
- TVN Mam Talent

== Conflict with Law and Justice government (2021) ==
Since 2020, TVN and the Polish government of the Law and Justice have had a conflict. In July 2021, a group of PiS lawmakers, submitted to parliament a draft amendment that would prevent companies from outside the European Economic Area taking control of Polish radio and television stations. This would mean Discovery, which owns TVN, might be forced to divest its ownership. TVN is known to be highly critical of Law and Justice (PiS) government. Agreement, the PiS coalition partner, was opposed to this – they instead proposed a change that would allow companies from countries in the Organisation for Economic Co-operation and Development (OECD) to own more than 49% of shares in Polish media companies, which means no change to American ownership of the channel. The government denies the measure is aimed at any one broadcaster, saying it seeks to prevent potential media acquisitions by non-EU countries such as Russia, China and Arab nations.

in August 2021, the bill was passed via the Sejm on a vote of 228 to 216, with 10 abstentions, making TVN's rights expire on September 26.

On August 30, 2021, the Chairman of the National Broadcasting Council sent to TV operators permission to enter the TVN24 program on the Discovery Communications Benelux B.V. license. The decision ensures the continuity of broadcasting the TVN24 program after September 26, 2021, regardless of the results of the ongoing conflict with Law and Justice government.

On December 17, 2021, parliamentary committee on culture and mass media unexpectedly resumed works on the bill, informing opposition MPs less than 20 minutes before the session. After a quick vote, the act was introduced to the Sejm, where it was adopted – equally quickly. The bill must be now signed by President Andrzej Duda to become law. On this day TVN24 signal was also transmitted by main TVN channel which has much wider broadcast range, also the news ticker of the station and the tvn24.pl website colours were changed to shades of black as a representation of a dark day in Polish media freedom. On 27 December 2021 the bill was vetoed by Polish President Andrzej Duda.

== See also ==
- Warner Bros. Discovery Poland
