= TTV (Poland) =

Polish television channel

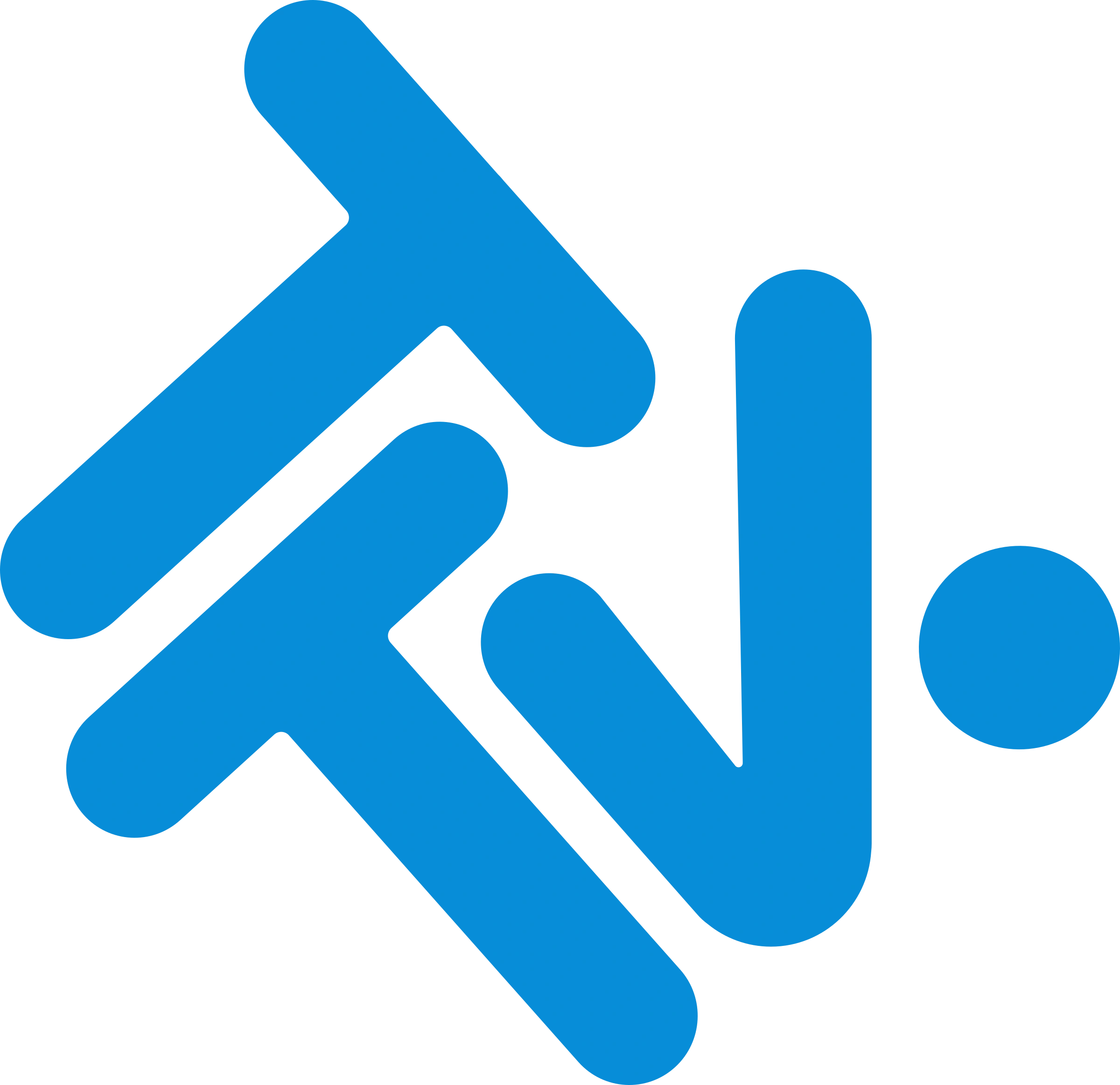
- Country: Poland
- Broadcast area: National
- Headquarters: Media Business Centre; Warsaw, Poland

Programming
- Picture format: 1080i (HDTV)

Ownership
- Owner: Stavka (TVN Group)
- Parent: Warner Bros. Discovery Poland
- Sister channels: TVN; TVN 7

History
- Launched: January 2, 2012; 14 years ago

Links
- Website: ttv.pl

Availability

Terrestrial
- Polish Digital: MUX 1 (Channel 13, Outside Poland)

TTV (Twoja Telewizja; English: Your Television) is the first Polish, free-to-air social-intervention television channel. It was launched on January 2, 2012. TTV broadcasts news and entertainment programs. The channel cooperates with TVN 24.

== History ==
In September 2011, Stavka and the TVN Group concluded an agreement on a close cooperation in the field of technology, advertising and programming. Originally, the channel was supposed to broadcast under the name U-TV, but the broadcaster requested before the launch to change the record in the concession received. The head of the station was Lidia Kazen. On February 1, 2012 the station was encrypted via satellite. On the same day the channel joined the Cyfrowy Polsat mux. On December 19, 2014 TTV was launched in Warsaw in HD quality on the Digital Terrestrial TV test multiplex (with TVN 7 in HD quality).

== Logo History ==
2012 - 2015	2015 - 2025	2025–present

== Programming ==
Title	English	2012		2013		2014		2015		2016		2017		2018	
Title	English	S	A	S	A	S	A	S	A	S	A	S	A	S	A
10 zadań specjalnych Michela Morana	Michel Moran's 10 special tasks										1		2		3
Alfabet strachu	Alphabet of Fear											1			
Anatomia głupoty według Doroty Wellman	Science of stupid according to Dorota Wellman										1				
Bagaż osobisty	Personal luggage			1											
Betlejewski. Prowokacje	Betlejewski. Provocations							1	2	3	4				
Damy i wieśniaczki. PL	Ladies and peasants. PL										1	2			3
Damy i wieśniaczki. Za granicą	Ladies and peasants. Abroad												1	2	
DeFacto	DeFacto						1	2	3	4	5	6	7	8	9
Druga twarz	Second face												1	2	
Dżentelmeni i wieśniacy	Gentlemen and peasants												1	2	
Express	Express														
Dzień, w którym pojawiła się forsa	The Day the Cash Came											1	2		
Fachowcy	Specialists												1		
Gogglebox. Przed telewizorem	Gogglebox. In front of the TV						1	2	3	4	5	6	7	8	9
Handlarze. Na zlecenie	Tradesmen. On commission						1	2	3						
Kossakowski. Być jak...	Kossakowski. Be like...										1		2		
Kossakowski. Inicjacja	Kossakowski. Initiation						1	2		3		4			
Kossakowski. Nieoczywiste	Kossakowski. Unobvious								1						
Kossakowski. Wtajemniczenie	Kossakowski. Mystagogy													1	2
Królowe życia	Queens of life										1	2	3	4	5
Komornicy	Bailiffs							1	2			3			
Made In Maroko	Made in Maroko														1
Między Nami	Between Us														1
Najlepszy w mieście	Best in Town								1						
Najgorszy polski kierowca	The worst Polish driver								1						
Nauka jazdy	Driving Course											1	2	3	4
O Mały Włos	By a Hair's Breadth														1
Odezwiemy się	We get back								1						
Ostatnia Szansa	Last Chance														1
Ostre cięcie	Sharp cut			1	2	3	4	5		6		7		8	
Ostre cięcie. Londyn	Sharp cut. London												1		
Orzeł Czy Reszka	Heads or Tails														1
Pierwszy raz za granicą	First time abroad										1		2		
Piękne i Odważne	Beautiful & Bold														1
Przepustka	Furlough					1		2							
Rinke. Na Krawędzi	Rinke. On the Edge														1
Rozmowy kontrolowane	Conversations controlled.									1					
Testerzy	Testers									1	2	3			
SOS. Ekipy w akcji	SOS. Teams in Action													1	
Usterka	Flaw				4	5	6	7	8	9	10	11	12		13
Uwaga! po Uwadze	Attention! After Attention														
Zamiana Żon	Wife Swap													1	2
