= TVN International =

Television station

TVN International (iTVN)
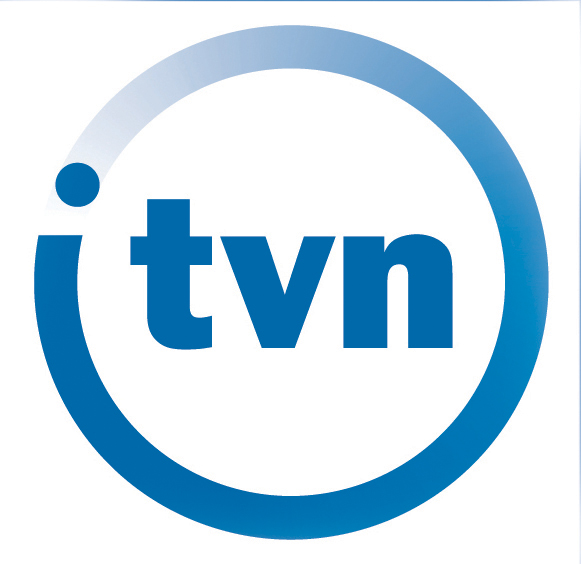
- Country: Poland
- Broadcast area: Worldwide
- Network: TVN
- Headquarters: Media Business Centre; Warsaw, Poland

Programming
- Language: Polish
- Picture format: 1080i HDTV (downscaled to 576i/480i for the SD feed).

Ownership
- Owner: Warner Bros. Discovery Poland
- Parent: TVN Group
- Sister channels: TVN International Extra

History
- Launched: 29 April 2004; 21 years ago

Links
- Website: itvn.pl

TVN International or iTVN is a Polish pay television channel that was launched in April 2004. It is part of the TVN network and is owned by TVN Warner Bros. Discovery It is aimed at the Polish diaspora living abroad, mainly in Europe and North America. iTVN's programming consists of TV series, newscasts, Polish football matches, movies and entertainment programmes, mostly of Polish origin.

== Distribution ==
TVN International is available via satellite in the U.S. and Australia, cable in Germany, France, Italy, Qatar, United States, Canada, Brazil, Latin America, Spain and the Caribbean.

As of 30 April 2010, RCN Corporation, a cable provider that provides its services to customers in Boston, New York, Washington DC, Eastern Pennsylvania and Chicago areas, broadcasts iTVN and TVN24 channels on 485 and 486 respectively (958 and 959 in Leigh Valley).

As of July 2011, TVN International started to be carried by Cablevision in the US.
