= TVN Fabuła =

- Country: Poland
- Broadcast area: Poland
- Network: TVN
- Headquarters: Media Business Centre; Warsaw, Poland

Programming
- Language(s): Polish
- Picture format: 1080i HDTV

Ownership
- Owner: Warner Bros. Discovery Poland
- Parent: TVN Group
- Sister channels: TVN; TVN 7

History
- Launched: 16 April 2015; 9 years ago

Links
- Website: tvnfabula.pl

TVN Fabula is a Polish TV channel launched on 16 April 2015.

The channel assigns series of TVN Group, movie trailers, foreign series and own productions. It also broadcasts programs on culture, showbiz and talk show with actors. The channel is broadcast in HDTV (1080i). The viewer has the option to watch movies with a Polish voice over or with original soundtrack and Polish subtitles. The station broadcasts daily binge-watching series, meaning several episodes of one series in a row.

== History ==
The channel started airing April 16, 2015 at 9pm. The first movie shown was The Lord of the Rings: The Return of the King.
