= Szkło kontaktowe =

Screenshot

Szkło kontaktowe (English: Contact Lens) is a Polish satirist program shown seven times a week, twice a day on TVN 24. Szkło kontaktowe launched on 25 January 2005. It is hosted by Grzegorz Miecugow (deceased in August 2017), Tomasz Sianecki, Wojciech Zimiński and Grzegorz Markowski.

Satirists (Artur Andrus, Maria Czubaszek, Ilona Łepkowska, Krzysztof Daukszewicz, Tomasz Jachimek, Marek Przybylik, Wojciech Zimiński and Kamil Dąbrowa) along with the host comment on the "funniest" news and stories of the day, with focus on the news from domestic politics. Viewers take part in the show by calling, sending text messages or e-mailing and sharing their opinions on-the-air with the host and his guest.

From time to time, special editions, often unscheduled, cover important event. Past special editions are:

- 2005 Polish parliamentary election
- 2005 Polish presidential election
- 2006 FIFA World Cup
- Lupa roku – a wrap-up of the year 2006
- 500th edition of Szkło kontaktowe

Szkło kontaktowe has won awards: Wiktory 2006 (TV debut of the year), Ulubiony program rozrywkowy (A favorite show) on The Good Mood Festival and Hit roku (Hit of the year) on Media & Marketing Polska Plebiscite.

Szkło kontaktowe organized a Lustro Szkła Kontaktowego plebiscite (Mirror of Szkło kontaktowe). The winner was Joanna Senyszyn, vice-president of the Democratic Left Alliance.

It is the most popular program broadcast by TVN 24.
