= TVN Turbo =

- Country: Poland
- Broadcast area: Poland
- Network: TVN
- Headquarters: Media Business Centre; Warsaw, Poland

Programming
- Picture format: 16:9 576i (SDTV); 1080i (HDTV)

Ownership
- Owner: Warner Bros. Discovery Poland
- Parent: TVN Group
- Sister channels: TVN Style

History
- Launched: 12 December 2003; 21 years ago

Links
- Website: tvnturbo.pl

Availability

Terrestrial
- MUX-4: Channel 116 (HD)

TVN Turbo is a Polish TV channel aimed at men with a major focus on automotive programming, it launched on 12 December 2003. It is part of the TVN network and is owned by Warner Bros. Discovery.

TVN Turbo features programming of interest to men, including such topics as the Polish & international automotive industry, technology and sports. It broadcasts original programming as well as foreign series. Original shows include: OES - a magazine show about motorsports, De Lux - a show about the world of luxury cars and program Jednoślad ("One-track") - a program for motorbike enthusiasts.

TVN Turbo is available via cable and satellite.

== Logos ==
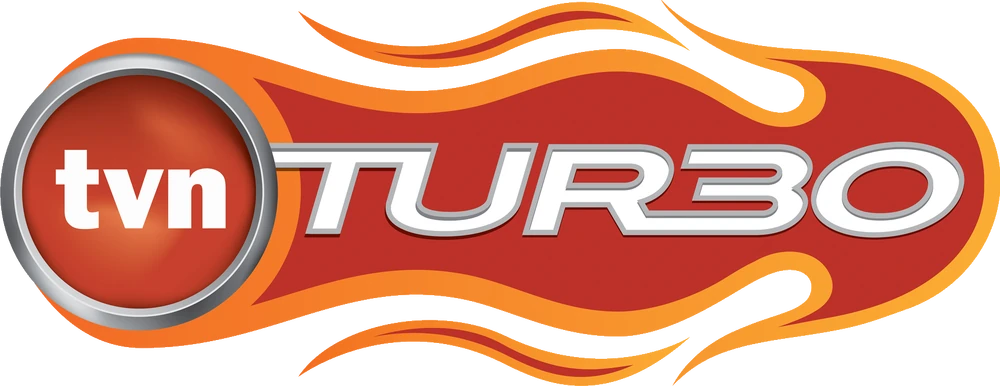
2003 – 2009	2009
