= Maria Czubaszek =

Polish writer and satirist (1939–2016)

- Czubaszek in 2014
- Born: 9 August 1939; Warsaw, Poland
- Died: 12 May 2016 (aged 76); Warsaw, Poland
- Occupations: Writer, satirist, journalist, lyricist, screenwriter
- Spouse: Wojciech Karolak
- Awards: Gloria Artis Medal (Gold, 2009)

Maria Czubaszek (9 August 1939 – 12 May 2016) was a Polish writer, journalist, lyricist and screenwriter.

== Biography ==
She studied English philology and journalism at the University of Warsaw, though she did not formally graduate neither of these studies. She was a live commentator in Szkło kontaktowe. Her remainings were buried at the Powązki Military Cemetery.

== Awards ==
In 2009, she received Gold Gloria Artis Medal for Merit to Culture.

== Bibliography ==
- Czubaszek, Maria; Andrus, Artur (2011). Każdy szczyt ma swój Czubaszek. Prószyński i S-ka. ISBN 978-83-7648-950-6.
- Czubaszek, Maria (2015). Dzień dobry, jestem z kobry. Czyli jak stracić przyjaciół w pół minuty i inne antyporady. Czerwone i Czarne. ISBN 978-83-7700-197-4.
