= Canal+ (Polish TV provider) =

Polish satellite platform

- Formerly: Cyfra+ (1998–2013) nc+ (2013–2019)
- Type: Joint venture
- Industry: Telecommunications
- Founded: 16 November 1998; 28 years ago
- Headquarters: Warsaw, Poland
- Products: Direct broadcast satellite
- Owner: Canal+ (51%); TVN (Skydance Corporation) (32%); Liberty Global (17%)
- Website: pl.canalplus.com/oferta-satelitarna

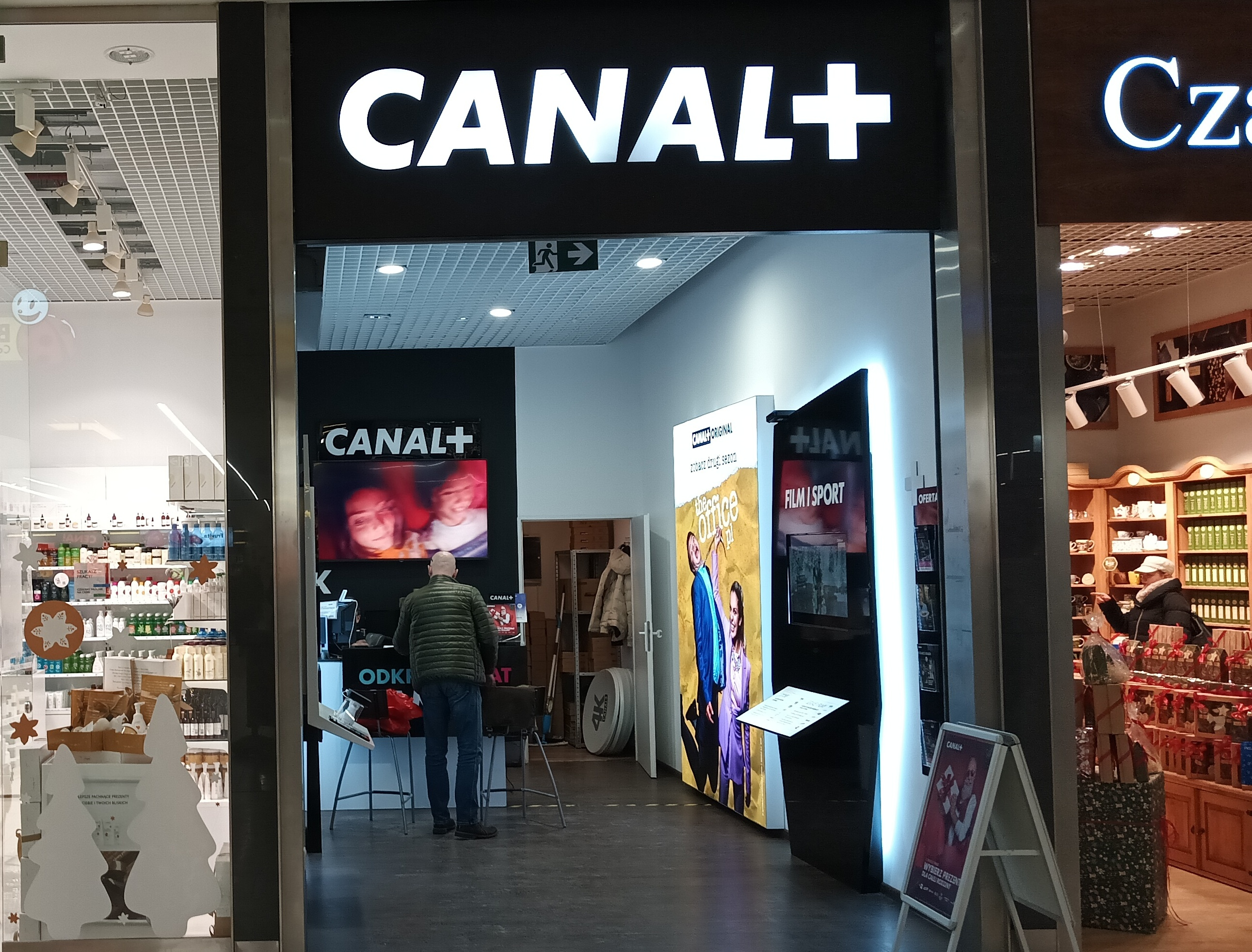
Canal + store in Tomaszów Mazowiecki, Poland (2022)

Canal+ (formerly Cyfra+ and nc+) is a Polish satellite platform co-owned by Canal+, Skydance Corporation's TVN and Liberty Global.

== History ==
Cyfra+

Former logo as Cyfra+

On 16 November 1998, Canal+ Poland launched a digital pay TV satellite service known as Cyfra+, replicating the model it followed for France (Canal Satellite Numerique), Spain (Canal Satélite Digital) and Italy (Tele+ Digitale) during the previous two years, even going as far to also utilize the same Mediasat box decoder. Unlike the satellite platforms of Canal+ in other countries, Cyfra+ did not initially offer a Pay-per-view service for movies and sports, and instead offered an interactive service known as Cyfra+ Magazyn, which offered detailed information about the various programs airing across the channels available on the platform, including at what hours said programs would air.

Like its other counterparts, Cyfra+ began aplifying its channel lineup by creating new channels with the Canal+ branding and that had been established by Canal+ in other countries, like MiniMax and Game One, as well incorporating channels managed by other companies, including its rival premium channels from HBO in Poland.

In 2002, Cyfra+ merged with Wizja TV, UPC Poland's satellite service, leading to the service to be breifly renamed as Nowa Cyfra+. As a result, Liberty Global, the owners of UPC Poland, retained a 17% ownership of Cyfra+.

By 2010, Cyfra+ had 1.6 million subscribers.

=== nc+ ===
Former logo as nc+

On 1 November 2011, it was announced that Canal+ was in negotiations with ITI Group, owners of the competing satellite TV platform n.

On 21 March 2013, Canal+ Polish subsidiary merged with ITI Neovision, ITI's media division, resulting in Cyfra+ merging with n to form nc+.

=== Canal+ ===
Former logo as Platforma Canal+

On 3 September 2019, nc+ rebranded as Platforma Canal+, dropping any references the discontinued n TV service. By 2020, the platform would be renamed again as simply Canal+, just like its french counterpart, and began offering its services via onine streaming, originally under the name Canal+ Online.
