= Metro (Polish TV channel) =

- Country: Poland

Programming
- Language: Polish
- Picture format: 16:9 576i (SDTV); 1080i (HDTV)

Ownership
- Owner: TVN Group
- Parent: Warner Bros. Discovery

History
- Launched: December 2, 2016; 9 years ago

Links
- Website: www.metro.tv

Availability

Terrestrial
- Polish Digital: MUX 8 - Channel 38 (SD)

Metro is a Polish television channel, launched on December 2, 2016. The first main owner of Metro was Agora SA - one of the largest and most renowned media companies in Poland, publisher of Gazeta Wyborcza. Shortly after the start of broadcasting, Agora SA sold to Discovery Communications (now Warner Bros. Discovery) a 49% of the shares in Metro. In August 2017, Discovery announced that it would buy on 1 September 2017 the remaining 51% for PLN 19 million under a share buyback agreement.

== Programming ==
Metro is a channel with movies, documentaries and lifestyle programs. As part of Warner Bros. Discovery decision, Metro along with Zoom TV was removed from MUX-8 DTT on December 29, 2025.
