= TVN (Polish TV channel) =

Polish commercial TV channel

- Country: Poland
- Broadcast area: Poland (including in some parts of Czech Republic, Slovakia, Germany, Kaliningrad, Lithuania, Ukraine, Belarus, Sweden, Denmark) and Worldwide (via internet)
- Headquarters: Media Business Centre; Warsaw, Poland

Programming
- Language: Polish
- Picture format: 1080i HDTV (downscaled to 576i for the SD feed)
- Timeshift service: TVN +1

Ownership
- Owner: Warner Bros. Discovery Poland
- Parent: TVN Group
- Key people: Katarzyna Kieli (CEO)
- Sister channels: TVN International; TVN International Extra; TVN24; TVN24 BiS; TVN Fabuła; TVN Style; TVN Turbo; TVN 7; TTV; Cartoon Network; Discovery Life; Food Network; HGTV

History
- Founded: May 1995 (as TVN Sp. z o.o.)
- Launched: 3 October 1997 at 19:00
- Replaced: Telewizja Wisła (1995–1997)
- Former names: TV7

Links
- Website: tvn.pl

Availability

Terrestrial
- Polish Digital: MUX 2 (SD) (Channel 5)

Streaming media
- Player.pl: player.pl

TVN (stylised in all lowercase) is a Polish free-to-air television station, network and a media and entertainment group in Poland. It was co-founded by Polish businessmen Mariusz Walter, Jan Wejchert and Swiss entrepreneur Bruno Valsangiacomo. It is owned by TVN Group, which as of October 2026, is a subsidiary of Skydance Corporation. The current CEO is Katarzyna Kieli (who is also president and managing director of Warner Bros. Discovery Poland).

TVN is available by satellite, cable television and digital terrestrial television.

In 2004, with its debut on the Warsaw Stock Exchange, the company became a public limited company. In March 2015, U.S. broadcaster Scripps Networks Interactive bought a 52.7% majority stake in TVN for €584 million. In July 2015, SNI bought out TVN's remaining owners, ITI Group and Canal+ Group, for €584 million, giving it full ownership.

On March 6, 2018, SNI was, in turn, acquired by Discovery, Inc. for US$14.6 billion. Liberty Global, which operated pay television provider UPC Polska, is a major shareholder in Discovery. The European Commission thus required TVN to ensure that TVN24 and TVN24 BiS remain available to third-party television providers.

== History ==
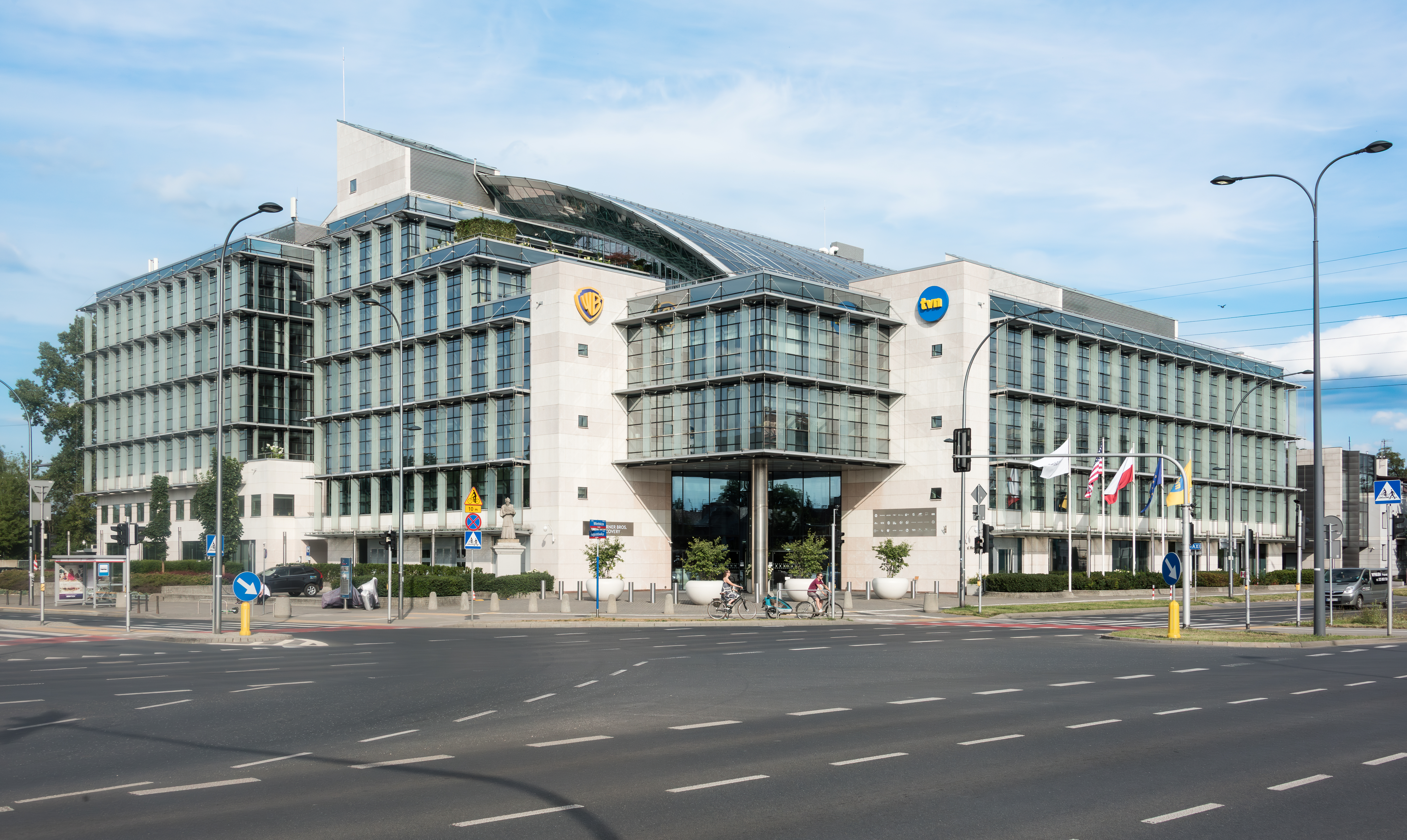
TVN HQ in Warsaw, Poland

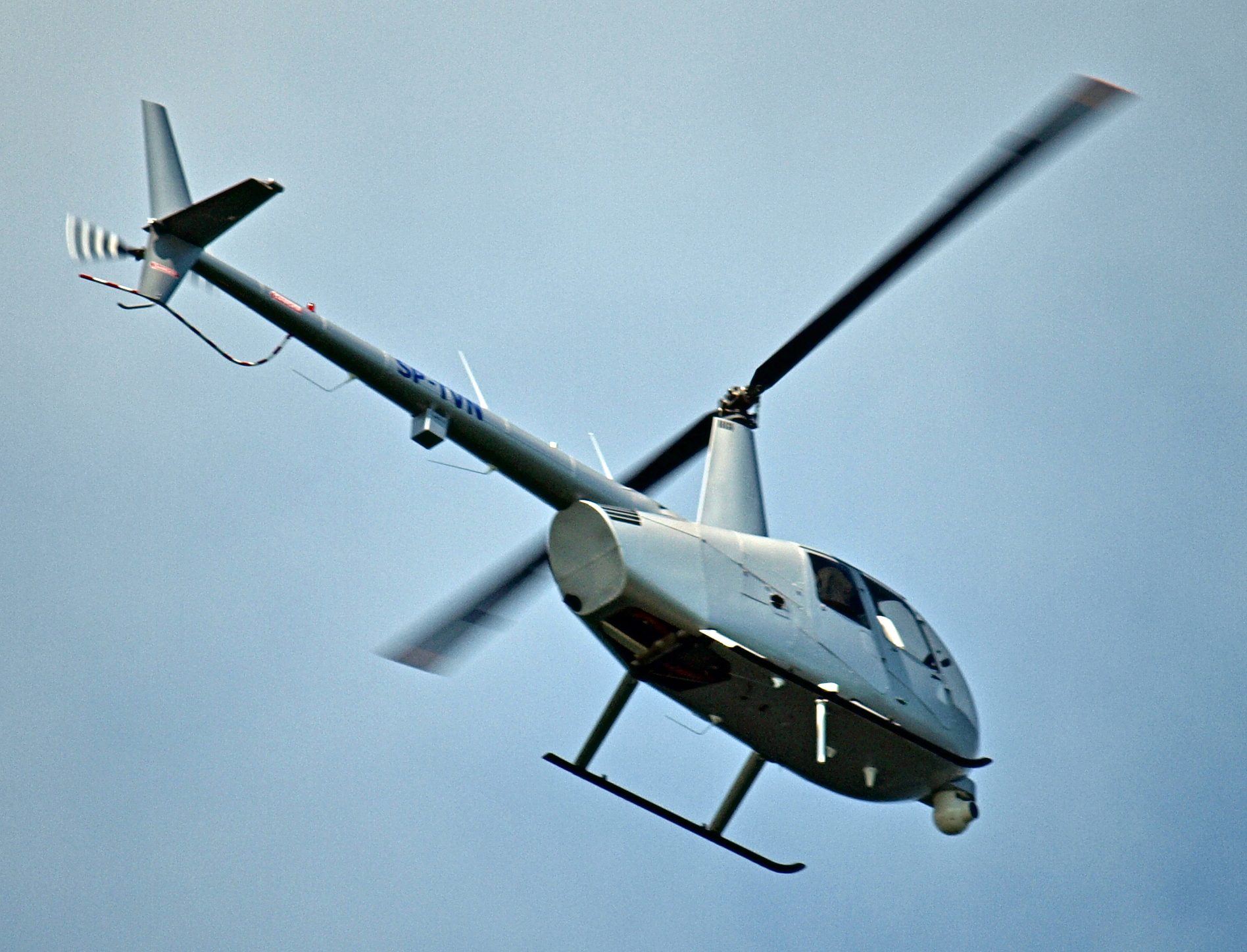
TVN's helicopter registered as SP-TVN

In March 1997, Grupa TVN obtained permission from The National Council of Radio Broadcasting and Television to broadcast in central and northern parts of Poland. A few months later Grupa TVN acquired Telewizja Wisła, which had a license to broadcast in southern Poland.

The channel was launched nationwide as TVN on 3 October 1997. In its early months, the high costs of buying foreign content led to TVN trying to find a uniquely Polish strategy for its programming, as both TVP and Polsat had occupied a significant part of the import revenue. One year after its launch, the channel was plagued by low ratings, management issues and regulatory problems, such as the conflicts between ITI and CME and the rescission of its broadcasting license in northern Poland. During the first four years the network was run by its founder Mariusz Walter. In 2001 Piotr Walter became chief executive officer, replacing his father.

In 2004 TVN was available in 86% of Polish households. Since 2004 TVN has been listed on the Warsaw Stock Exchange. On 29 April 2004 TVN launched TVN International, an entertainment and news channel for Polish viewers living abroad. In 2005 TVN acquired rights to organise and broadcast Sopot International Song Festival until 2010, and has acquired said rights again from 2017. In 2006 TVN launched its high definition version, TVN HD, which was the first HD television channel in Poland.

TVN is a supporter of the Hybrid Broadcast Broadband TV (HbbTV) initiative that is promoting and establishing an open European standard for hybrid set-top boxes for the reception of broadcast TV and broadband multimedia applications with a single user interface, and conducted the first tests of HbbTV services in Poland in March 2012.

On 16 March 2015, TVN announced a sale of a 52.7% controlling stake to the U.S. broadcaster Scripps Networks Interactive (SNI) for €584 million, subject to regulatory approval. In July 2015, SNI bought out the remaining owners for €584 million. SNI was, in turn, acquired by Discovery Communications (now Discovery Inc.) for US$14.6 billion, in a sale completed 6 March 2018.

=== Conflict with Law and Justice government (2021) ===
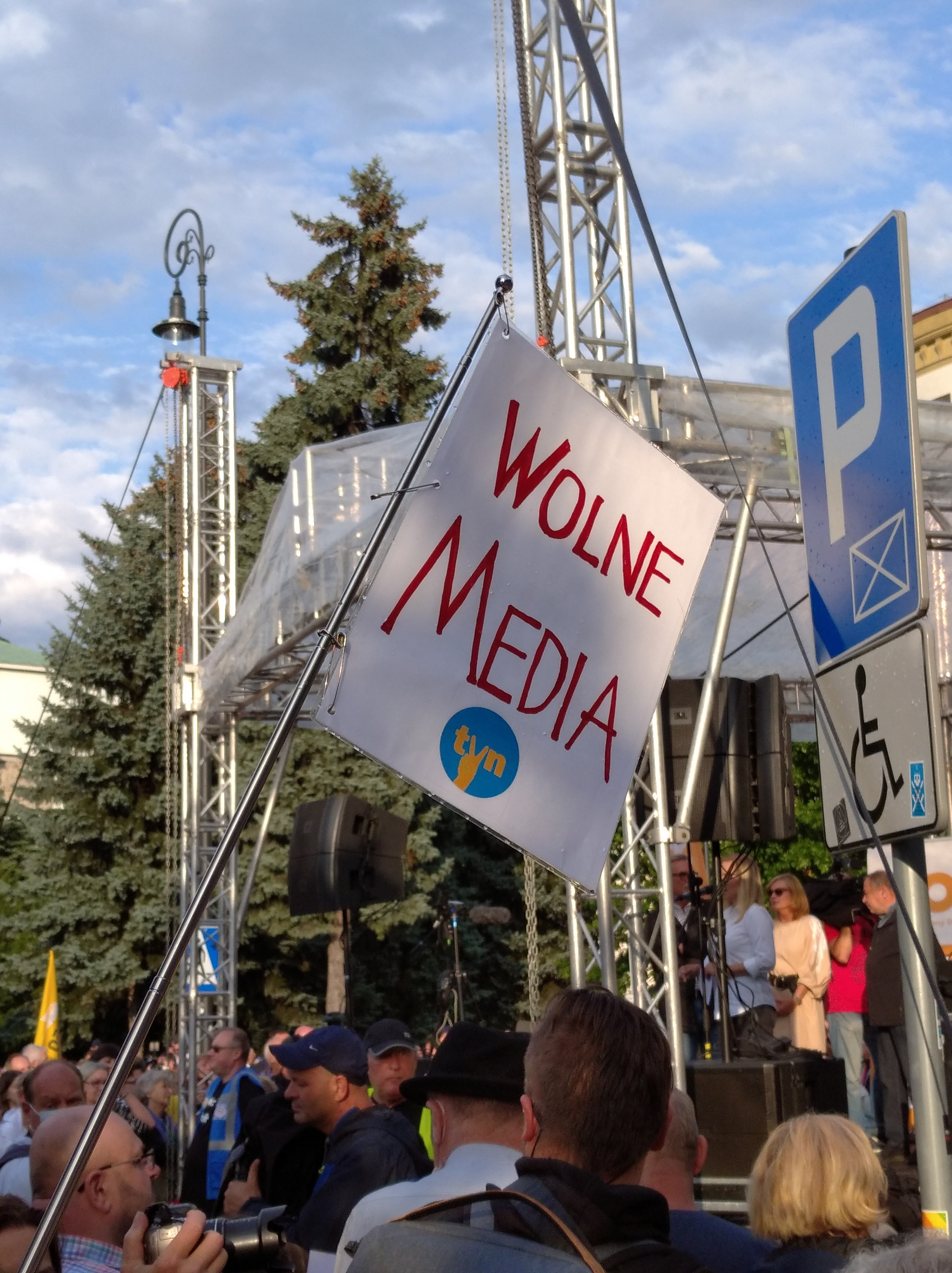
A banner with the words „Wolne Media” ("Free Media") and the TVN logo modified with the V sign during a protest against Lex TVN in August 2021.

TVN tends to be strongly critical of the Law and Justice (PiS) party, since it was sworn to power in 2015. Historian and columnist Timothy Garton Ash, writing for The Guardian, praised Fakty TVN's critical coverage of government issues when harshly criticising Telewizja Polska's Wiadomości (News).

The Facts is not BBC-style impartial: it clearly favours a more liberal, pro-European Poland and is strongly anti-PiS. But unlike the so-called News, it is still definitely professional, high quality, reality-based journalism.

Since 2020 the conflict between TVN and the PiS worsened, to a degree that, by July 2021, a group of PiS lawmakers, submitted to parliament a draft amendment that would prevent companies from outside the European Economic Area taking control of Polish radio and television stations. This would mean that Discovery, the owner of TVN, might be forced to divest its ownership. The Agreement, then PiS' coalition partner, was opposed to this, they instead proposed a change that would allow companies from countries in the Organisation for Economic Co-operation and Development (OECD) to own more than 49% of shares in Polish media companies, which would mean no change to the American ownership of the channel.

However, opposition, as well as representatives from European Union and the United States criticized the law, and international observers expressed fear that the law is threatening press freedom in Poland. The law has been criticized for "threatening the largest ever US investment in Poland". This also led to protests within the country, with a number of demonstrations on 10 August.

On 11 August 2021, the bill was passed via the Sejm on a vote of 228 to 216, with 10 abstentions, as a result, TVN's licence could expire on September 26.

On 30 August 2021, the Chairman of the National Council of Radio Broadcasting and Television sent to the TV operators a decision to move the licence of sister channel TVN24 into the Discovery Communications Benelux B.V. license, based in the Netherlands. The decision ensures the continuity of broadcasting the TVN24 program after 26 September 2021, regardless of the results of the ongoing conflict with Law and Justice government. On 24 September 2021 - two days before the expiration of the previous licence - TVN24 was granted a new Polish licence.

On 18 December 2021, the bill was passed via the Sejm. The Sejm voted in favor 229-212 with 11 abstentions to override the Senate's veto. Law and Justice (PiS) party and allied opposition group Kukiz'15 voted for the bill, against was the remaining opposition with the exception of far-right Confederation, which abstained. The bill was vetoed by Polish President Andrzej Duda on 27 December 2021.

== Logo history ==
| 1997–2013 | 2013–2024 | 2024–present |

== See also ==
- List of programmes broadcast by TVN
- Television in Poland
