= TVN24 BiS =

Polish 24-hour hybrid business and world news channel

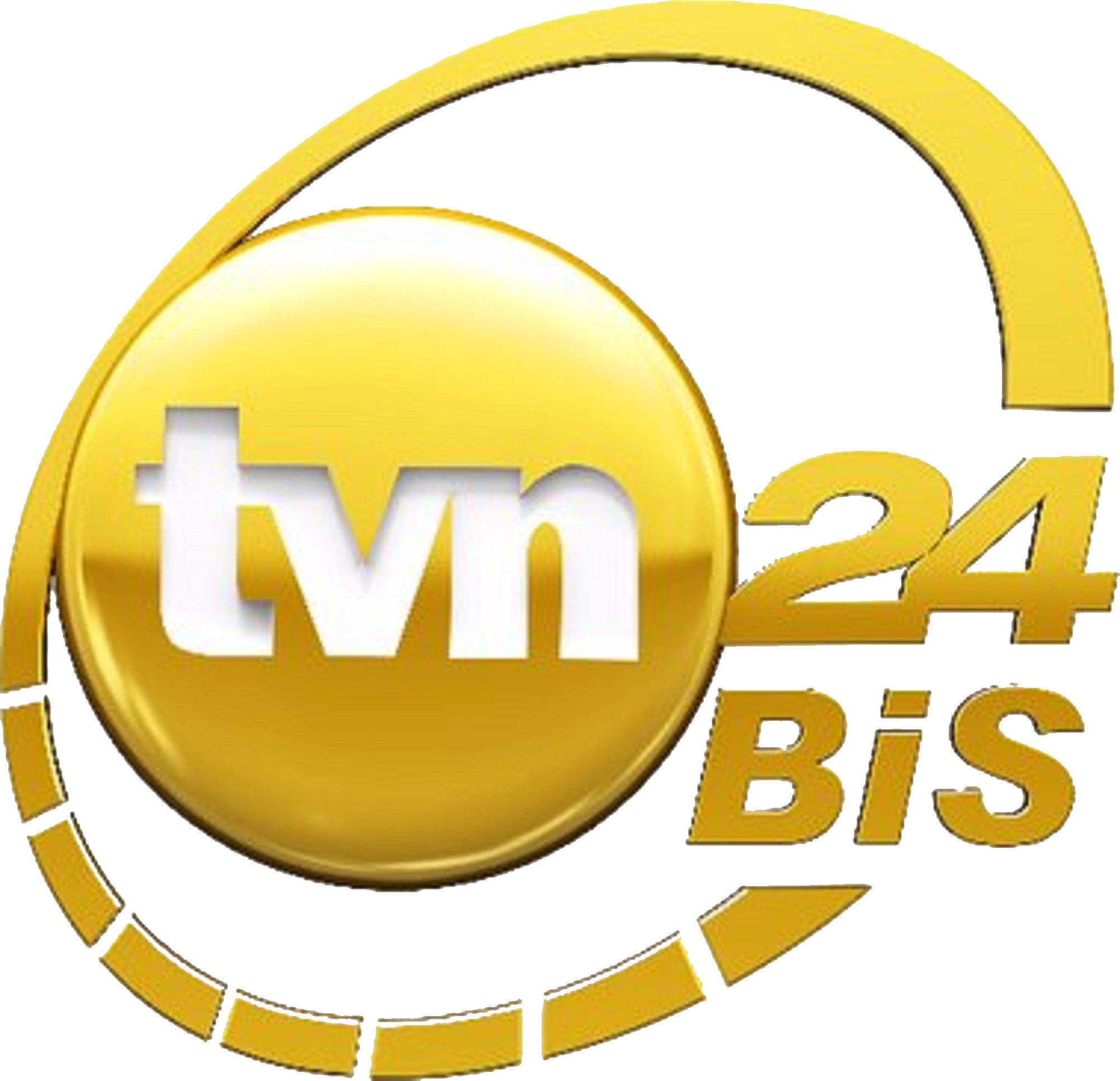
- Country: Poland
- Broadcast area: Nationwide; International
- Headquarters: Media Business Centre; Warsaw, Poland

Programming
- Picture format: 16:9 (576i, SDTV); 16:9 (1080i, HDTV)

Ownership
- Owner: Warner Bros. Discovery Poland
- Parent: TVN Group
- Sister channels: TVN24

History
- Launched: 3 September 2006; 19 years ago
- Former names: TVN CNBC Biznes (2006–2009); TVN CNBC (2009–2013); TVN24 Biznes i Świat (2013-2014)

Links
- Website: www.tvn24bis.pl

TVN24 BiS (formerly TVN CNBC and TVN24 Biznes i Świat) is a Polish 24-hour hybrid business and world news channel, sister channel to TVN24. TVN24 BiS belongs to the TVN Group which in turn is controlled by Warner Bros. Discovery. The channel's main newsroom and studio are located at the Media Business Centre building in Warsaw. As the hybrid business and International news channel, most of the programmes are a combination of both format, although there are some exceptions.

The channel is available on satellite television platforms Polsat Box and Canal+, as well as most cable networks in Poland. The channel is competing with Telewizja Polsat's Polsat News 2, which also utilises the hybrid 'news and business' format similar to TVN24 BiS's.

== History ==
The channel was launched on 3 September 2006 as TVN CNBC Biznes in cooperation with CNBC Europe, and was part of NBC Universal's worldwide network of business-oriented channels. It also served as CNBC's "Polish Bureau" providing occasional live feeds for breaking news in Poland and Central Europe. The facilities were also used to produce Poland's first TV series about Polish business – "Business Poland" which aired as part of CNBC's weekend programming in Europe and weekly programming on CNBC World in North America.

TVN24, the channel's sister operation, produced business news segments under the TVN CNBC banner.

On 1 January 2014 at 00:00, the channel was rebranded as TVN24 Biznes i Świat, dropping any reference to the CNBC brand. It also adopted the 'news and business' hybrid format.

On 26 February 2016, the channel shortened its name to TVN24 BiS. On 8 November 2016, the channel launched an HD simulcast feed.

== Programming ==
- Fakty (The Facts)
- Fakty po Faktach (The Facts after the Facts)
- Fakty o Świecie (The Facts from Abroad)
- Babilon (2015-2020)
- Otwarcie Dnia (Opening Day) (2014-2018)
- Million w Portfelu (Millions in Wallet) (2014-2016)
- Świat Technologii (World Technology) (2015-2020)
- Dzień na Świecie (Day on World)
- Biznes dla Ludzi (Business for the People)
- Bilans (Balance) (2014-2020)
- 24 Godziny (24 Hours)
- 24 Godziny po Południu (24 Hours at Noon)
- Tydzień według Jacka (Week by Jack) (2014-2016)
- Świat według Jacka (World by Jack) (2014-2016)
- Show Biznes i Świat (Business Show) (2015-2020)
- Piąta strona Świata (World's Market Page) (2015-2017)
- Świat o Czwartej (World at 4 O'Clock) (2015-2020)
- Świat w Południe (World at Midday) (2015-2019)
- Poranek na BIŚ (Morning on BIŚ) (2014-2017)
- Kontra-Wersje (Against-Version) (2014-2016)

== Logo History ==
2007 - 2010	2010 - 2013	2014 - 2016	2016–present
