= TVN 7 =

Polish television channel

TVN7
- Country: Poland
- Network: TVN
- Headquarters: Media Business Centre; Warsaw, Poland

Programming
- Picture format: 1080i HDTV

Ownership
- Owner: Warner Bros. Discovery Poland
- Parent: TVN Group
- Sister channels: TVN; TTV

History
- Launched: 6 December 1996; 29 years ago
- Former names: RTL 7 (1996-2002); TVN Siedem (2002-2008)

Links
- Website: tvn7.pl

Availability

Terrestrial
- Polish digital: MUX 2 (SD) (Channel 8)

TVN7 is a Polish television channel specialising in action, drama and comedy shows and movies. Owned by TVN Group, the channel was launched in March 2002, replacing RTL 7.

== History ==
RTL 7 launched on 6 December 1996; "The Final Countdown" by Europe played during the countdown, and the first program broadcast was The Spooktacular New Adventures of Casper. Initially, the channel's schedule emphasized productions with titles centered around the number seven.

Soon, the headquarters in Luxembourg introduced significant budget cuts, limiting the station's financing despite its steadily growing popularity. In 1999, Universal Studios also withdrew its funding. At the end of March 2000, the news program 7 minut – Wydarzenia dnia (7 minutes – Events of the Day) was cancelled, followed by the program Zoom a few months later. At the same time, the station's logo and on-air graphics were changed, modeled on those of Veronica, a Dutch channel owned by CLT-UFA from 1996 to 2001. With these changes, the station aimed to distance itself from its former image, and its in-house production was eliminated. The channel's decline was compounded by Polsat's takeover of Nasza TV, which had cooperated with RTL 7 and was subsequently renamed TV4. As a result, RTL 7's programs were no longer broadcast on terrestrial channels.

At the end of 2001, RTL 7 was purchased by the Polish ITI Group. On 1 March 2002, it was replaced by TVN Siedem (Polish for "TVN Seven"), which broadcast mainly reruns of films and series from TVN's main channel.

On 1 September 2008, the station was rebranded as TVN 7. The new branding included an updated logo—the number seven inside a white and purple circle—as well as new on-air graphics and music. The on-screen logo was also moved to the upper-right corner of the screen. The schedule was divided into thematic blocks, each with a distinct graphic style and color scheme. This rebranding aimed to attract a new target audience: young, active viewers from large cities, and was accompanied by the addition of new programs.

TVN 7 launched its HD version on 4 November 2011.

On 1 September 2014, a fourth graphic design was introduced, dominated by the colors orange, fuchsia, and anthracite. A new logo was also introduced, resembling that of the main TVN channel, and the on-air music was updated. Two new programming blocks were added: the soap opera block Loving Afternoon and the documentary block Dokument w Siódemce (Documentary on Seven).

On 30 August 2021, the on-air graphics were changed and the logo was refreshed.

== Logos ==
Years	Logo (SD version)	Logo (HD version)
RTL 7
1996–2000		—
2000–2002		—
TVN Siedem
2002–2008		—
TVN 7
2008–2014		2011–2014
2014–2021		
since 2021		
