= ITI Group =

Media conglomerate in Poland

ITI Corporation
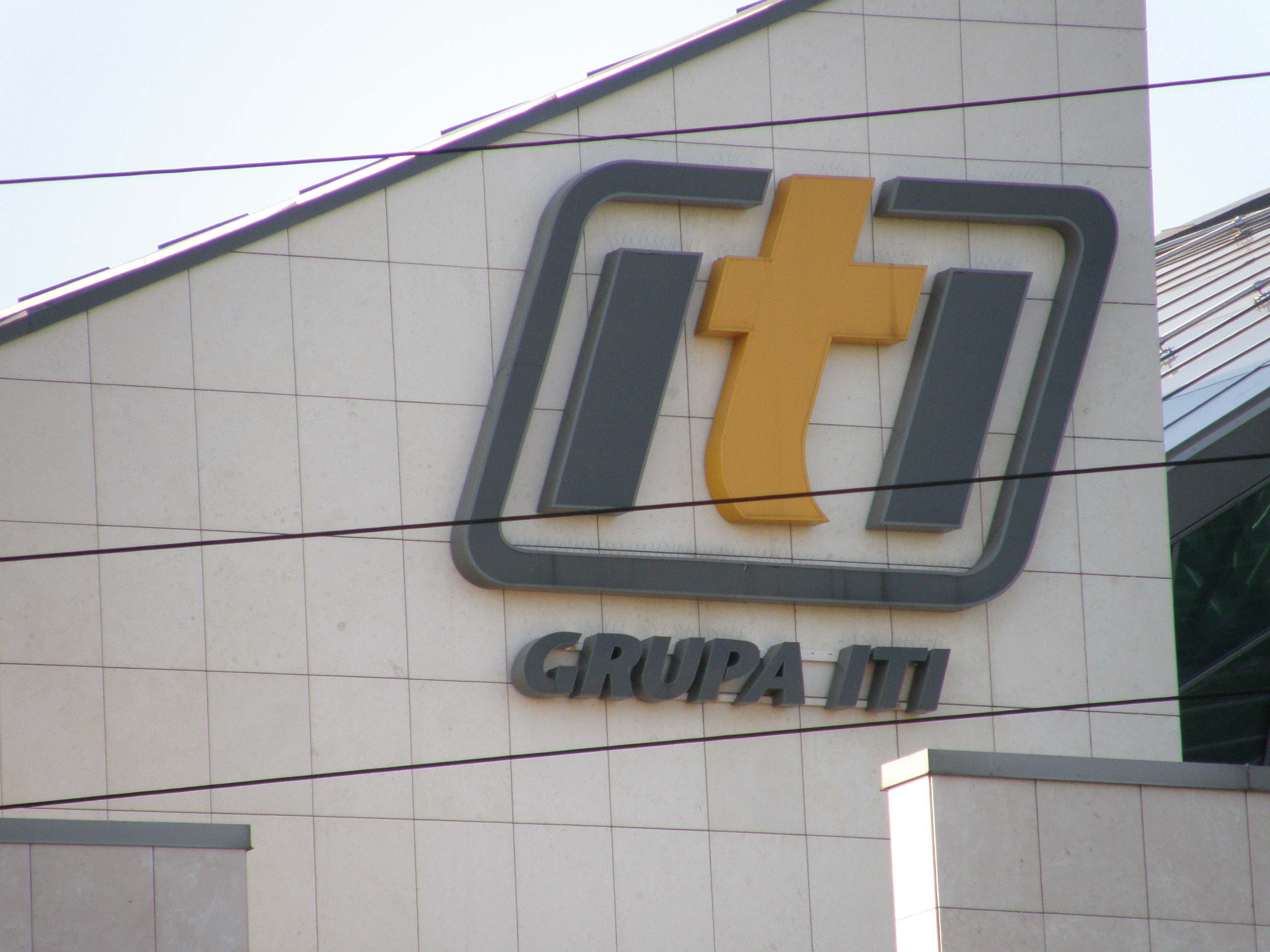
- Industry: Media
- Founded: 1984
- Defunct: 2018
- Fate: Closed
- Headquarters: Warsaw, Poland

Logo of ITI Home Video, former Polish distributor of movies on video cassettes. The distributor was part of ITI Group.

ITI Group (International Trading and Investments Holdings SA Luxembourg), known as Grupa ITI in Poland, was a large media conglomerate headquartered in Warsaw, Poland. On 2 July 2015, ITI Group and Canal+ Group completed the sale of their controlling interest in TVN to Scripps Networks Interactive.

The ITI Group was co-founded by businessmen Jan Wejchert (1950–2009) and Mariusz Walter in 1984. The company received a license from the then authorities of the Polish People's Republic to import electronic equipment and distribute films on video cassettes in Poland. Wejchert served as the ITI Group's first President and founding shareholder. Wejchert ran the company jointly with Walter and Bruno Valsangiacomo.

In 2018, after selling all of its assets, the company was closed.
