= TVN24 =

Polish 24-hour news channel

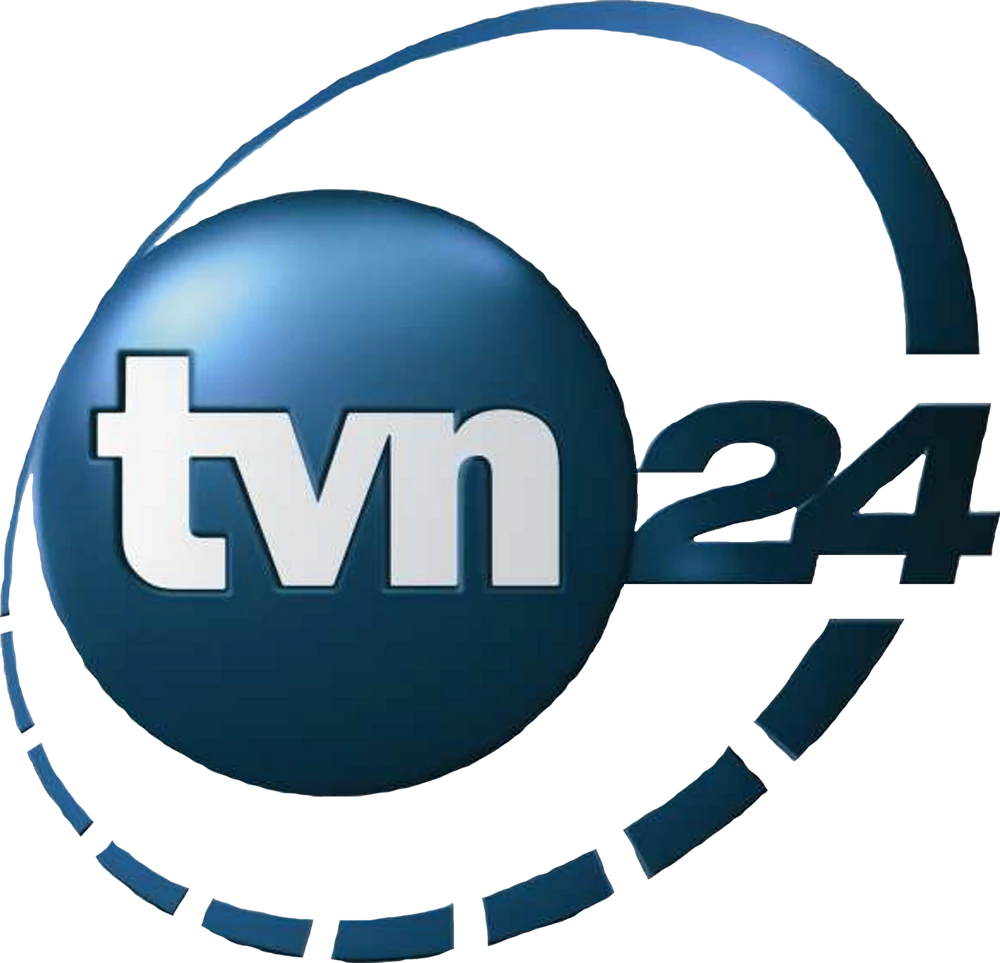
- Country: Poland
- Broadcast area: Nationwide; International
- Network: TVN
- Headquarters: Media Business Centre; Warsaw, Poland

Programming
- Picture format: 576i (TVN24) (16:9 1080i (HDTV) (TVN24 HD)

Ownership
- Owner: TVN Group (Warner Bros. Discovery)
- Sister channels: TVN24 BiS

History
- Launched: 9 August 2001; 25 years ago (SD); 30 November 2012; 13 years ago (HD)
- Former names: TVN24

Links
- Website: tvn24.pl tvn24.pl/english

Availability

Terrestrial
- Polish digital: Polsat Box - MUX 6 Channel 56 CANAL+ - MUX 1 Channel 27 (pay)

Streaming media
- Official website: TVN24 + (only available in Polish with charging)

TVN24 is a Polish 24-hour commercial news channel, launched on 9 August 2001. Being a part of the TVN Network, TVN24 has been owned since 2018 by US-based media company Warner Bros. Discovery (Discovery, Inc. before 2022) via the TVN Group and TVN Warner Bros. Discovery subsidiaries. It gained broader popularity after the September 11, 2001 attacks in the US, which was the first major incident to be covered by TVN24. It is available over all digital platforms in Poland (Polsat Box and Platforma Canal+) as well as in most cable networks and some networks in other countries, including USA (Dish Network) and Germany. The audio portion of the channel can be streamed on the internet.

Launched on 30 November 2012, TVN24 is the longest-established HD news channel in Poland and East-Central Europe.

The TVN24 team is also responsible for the TVN flagship newscast, Fakty TVN. During major events (such as September 11 attacks, Pope John Paul II's death, the Polish presidential plane crash, Lex TVN controversy and Russian invasion of Ukraine), TVN24 is retransmitted by TVN which has much wider broadcast range.

On 6 February 2018, the European Commission approved the Discovery (now Warner Bros. Discovery) acquisition deal. Since Liberty Global, which operates pay television services in Poland under the UPC Polska brand, is a major shareholder in Discovery Inc, EU competition law required that Discovery ensures the continued availability of TVN24 and TVN24 BiS to third-party TV providers.

Since December 2019, the station has been overseen by Michał Samul.

== Online ==
TVN24 debuted its news website tvn24.pl on 19 March 2007.

== TVN24 HD ==
A one of TVN's planned channels is TVN24 HD. Test & official start of the TVN24 HD started on 30 November 2012.

== Editorial stance and reception ==
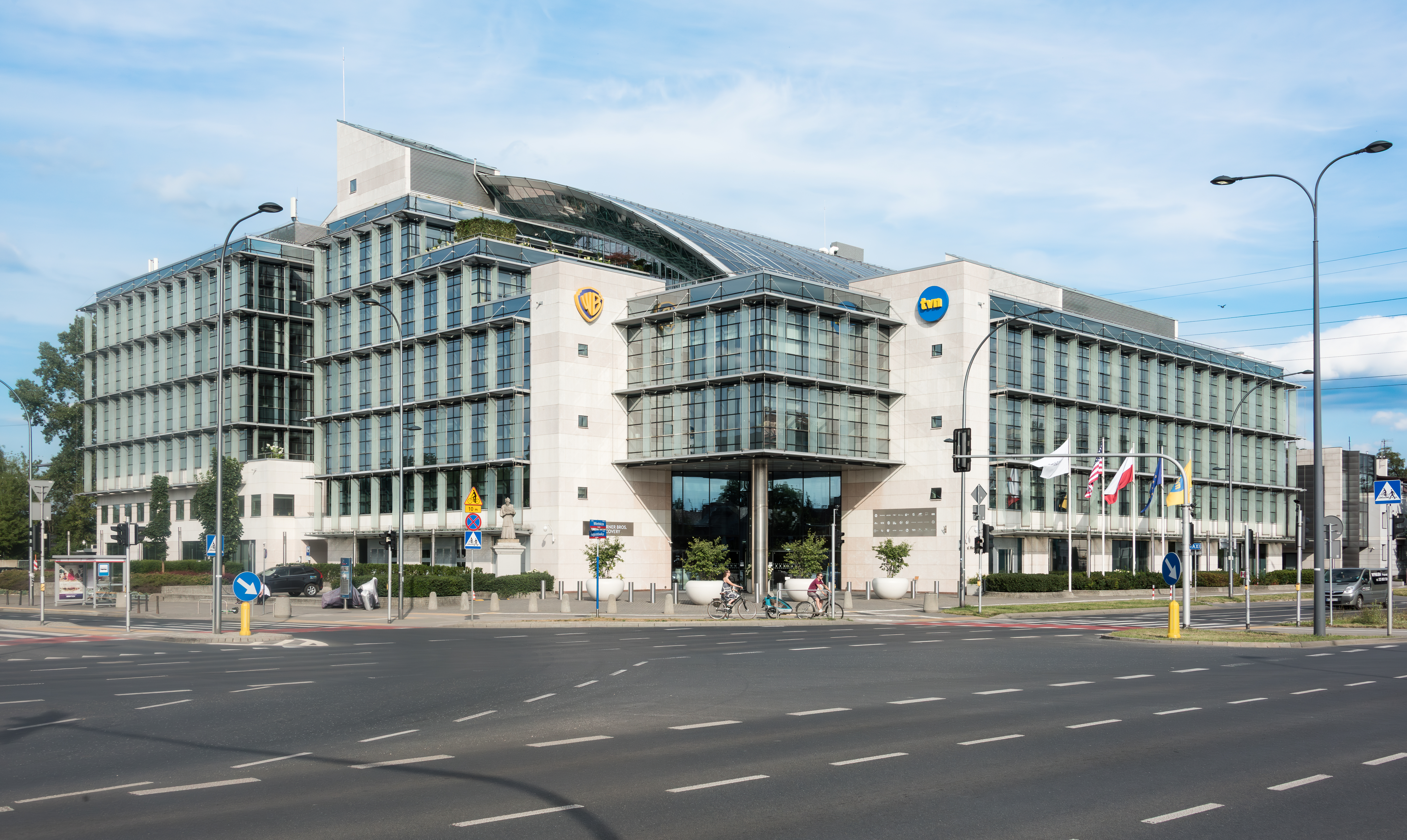
The company's headquarters in Warsaw, 2017.

TVN24 tends to be strongly critical of the Polish government under the Law and Justice (PiS) party. Historian and columnist Timothy Garton Ash has praised Fakty TVN, writing that it is far more professional than Telewizja Polska's (TVP) Wiadomości (News). Ash wrote in 2019: "The Facts is not BBC-style impartial: it clearly favours a more liberal, pro-European Poland and is strongly anti-PiS. But unlike the so-called News, it is still definitely professional, high quality, reality-based journalism."

== TVN24 Journalists, reporters and correspondents ==
- Anita Werner (TVN24, Fakty TVN) - Host of Fakty TVN and Fakty po Faktach (The Facts After the Facts)
- Katarzyna Kolenda-Zaleska (TVN24, Fakty TVN) - Host of Fakty po Faktach (The Facts After The Facts)
- Piotr Kraśko (TVN24, Fakty TVN) - Host of Fakty TVN, Facts about the World (Fakty o Świecie) and Fakty po Faktach (The Facts After The Facts)
- Marta Kuligowska (TVN24) - Host of Poranek TVN24(TVN24 Morning), Dzień po dniu(The Day after Day) and Polska i Świat(Poland and the World)
- Mateusz Walczak (TVN24, TVN24 BiS) - Host of Fakty o Świecie (Facts About The World)
- Grzegorz Kajdanowicz (TVN24, Fakty TVN) - Host of Fakty TVN, Fakty po południu (The Facts of the Afternoon) and Fakty po Faktach (The Facts After the Facts)
- Piotr Marciniak (TVN24, Fakty TVN) - Host of Fakty TVN, Fakty po południu (The Facts at the Afternoon) and Fakty po Faktach (The Facts After the Facts)
- Anna Seremak (TVN24) - Host of Poranek TVN24(TVN24 Morning) and Dzień na żywo TVN24(TVN24 Live Day)
- Jolanta Pieńkowska (TVN24) - Host of Fakty o Świecie(Facts About the World) and Fakty po południu(Facts at the Afternoon)
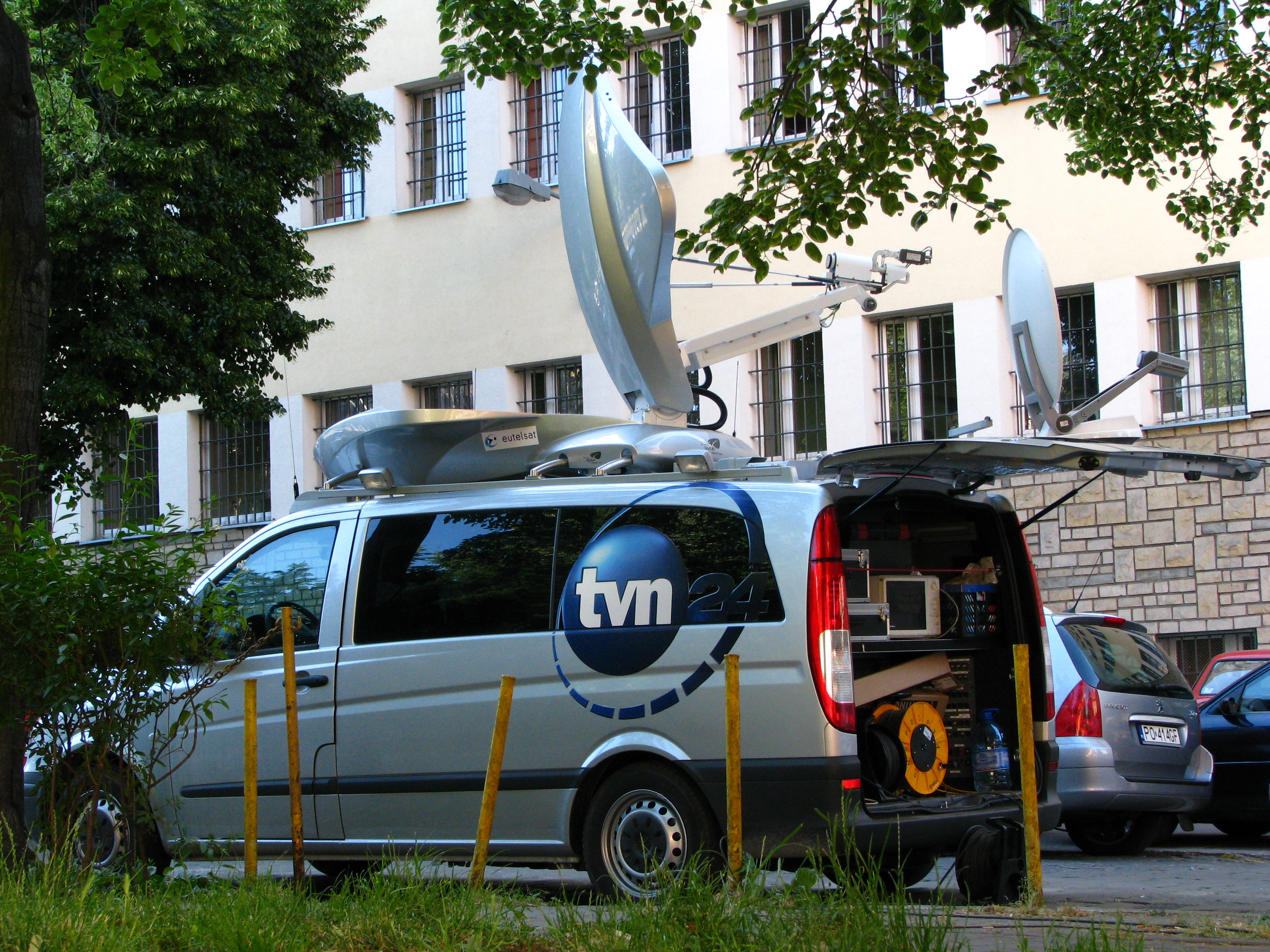
- TVN24 broadcasting van (SNG) during transmission from Poznań.
  Konrad Piasecki (TVN24) - Host of Rozmowa Piaseckiego (Piasecki's Interview) and Kawa na Ławę (Coffee on the Bench)
- Diana Rudnik (TVN24, Fakty TVN) - Host of Fakty TVN, Fakty po południu (The Facts in the Afternoon) and Fakty po Faktach (The Facts After the Facts)
- Maciej Mazur (TVN24, Fakty TVN) - Host of Ranking Mazura (Mazur's Ranking) and TVN24 and Fakty TVN reporter
- Marcin Zaborski (TVN24) - Host of Jeden na Jeden(One on One) and Tak Jest!(Yes, It Is!), formerly the host of Fakty RMF FM and RMF24
- Maciej Sokołowski (TVN24, Fakty TVN) - TVN24 correspondent to Brussels, Belgium
- Maciej Woroch (TVN24, Fakty TVN) - TVN24 correspondent for London, England, United Kingdom
- Marcin Wrona (TVN24 Fakty TVN) - TVN24 correspondent for Washington, D.C., United States
- Andrzej Zaucha (TVN24, Fakty TVN) - TVN24 correspondent to Kyiv, Ukraine and Moscow, Russia
- Jan Pachlowski (TVN24, Fakty TVN) - TVN24 correspondent to Washington, D.C., United States
- Wojciech Bojanowski (TVN24, CNN) - TVN24 and CNN correspondent
- Katarzyna Kwiatkowska (TVN24) - Host and Commentator of Szkło kontaktowe(Contact Lens)
- Tomasz Sianecki (TVN24) - Host and commentator of Szkło kontaktowe(Contact Lens)
- Piotr Jacoń (TVN24) - Host of the Fakty po południu (the Facts at the Afternoon), Serwis Informacyjny TVN24 (TVN24 News Service) and Dzień po dniu (The Day after the Day)
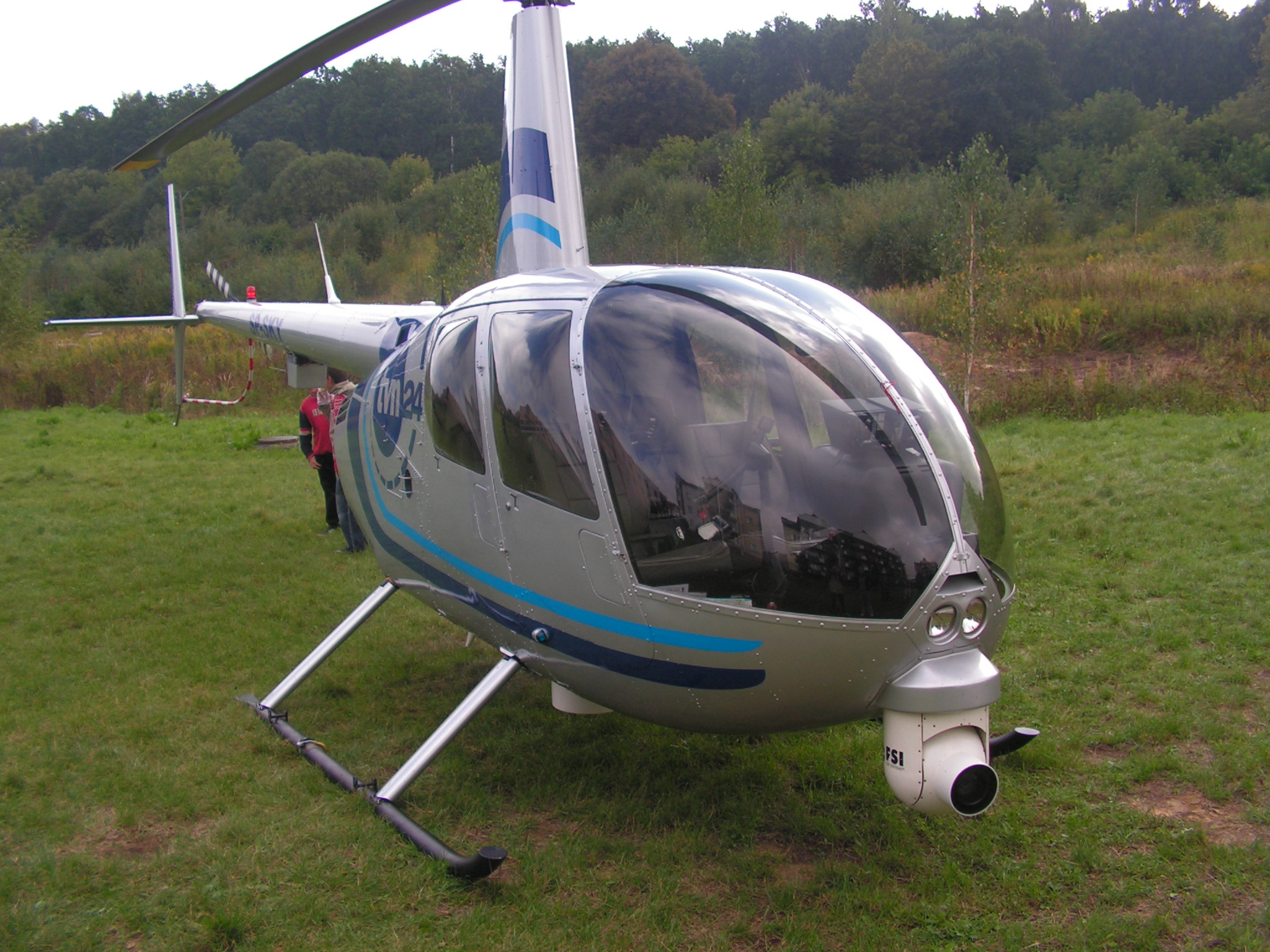
- TVN24 broadcasting helicopter in 2007.
  Radomir Wit (TVN24) - TVN24 correspondent in Sejm of the Republic of Poland, host of Bez Kitu(Without Kit)
- Agata Adamek (TVN24) - Host of the Jeden na Jeden (One on One), W Kuluarach(In the Lobby) and Tak Jest(Yes, It Is!)
- Arleta Zalewska (TVN24, Fakty TVN) - TVN24 and Fakty correspondent to the Sejm of the Republic of Poland in Warsaw, Poland, Host of the Jeden na Jeden(One on One), W Kuluarach(In the Lobby), Tak Jest!(Yes, It Is!)
- Konrad Piasecki (TVN24) - Host of the Rozmowa Piaseckiego(Piasecki's Conversation), Kawa na Ławę(Coffee on the Bench), W Kuluarach(In the Lobby)
- Alina Makarchuk (TVN24, Espreso TV) - TVN24 correspondent to Kyiv, Ukraine
- Oleh Biletskiy (TVN24, Espreso TV) - TVN24 correspondent for Kyiv, Ukraine
- Michał Sznajder (TVN24, TVN24 BIS) - Host of Fakty o Świecie(Facts About the World) in TVN24 BIS, TVN24 and TVN24 BIS special correspondent to Washington D.C., United States
