= UPC Poland =

Polish telco

UPC Polska
- Industry: Telecommunications
- Predecessor: Play
- Founded: 1989 (as Polska Telewizja Kablowa); October 2000 (as UPC Polska)
- Defunct: August 31, 2023
- Fate: Discontinued in favor of Play
- Headquarters: Warsaw, Poland
- Area served: Poland
- Products: Cable television Broadband internet Telephone
- Revenue: $469.9 million
- Owner: Play
- Parent: Iliad SA
- Website: www.upc.pl

UPC Polska (English: UPC Poland) was Iliad's telecommunications operation in Poland. It is one of the largest provider of broadband internet, digital television, telephony and mobile services (as an MVNO based on Play's network) in Poland. It was founded in 2000 when Liberty Global acquired Polska Telewizja Kablowa (PTK). According to the SpeedTest.pl ranking, in 2021 UPC was the fastest nationwide home internet provider in Poland. At the end of Q3, 2021, the company offered to over 1,5 million customers in Poland more than 3,3 million digital subscriptions; its network reached nearly 3,7 million households.

On September 22, 2021, Iliad, the owner of Play, acquired UPC Poland from Liberty Global for US$1.8 billion. The deal was closed on April 1, 2022. On August 31, 2023, UPC brand was discontinued in favor of Play.
