= Media Business Centre =

Office building in Warsaw, Poland

Coordinates: 52.1790877°N 21.0707226°E

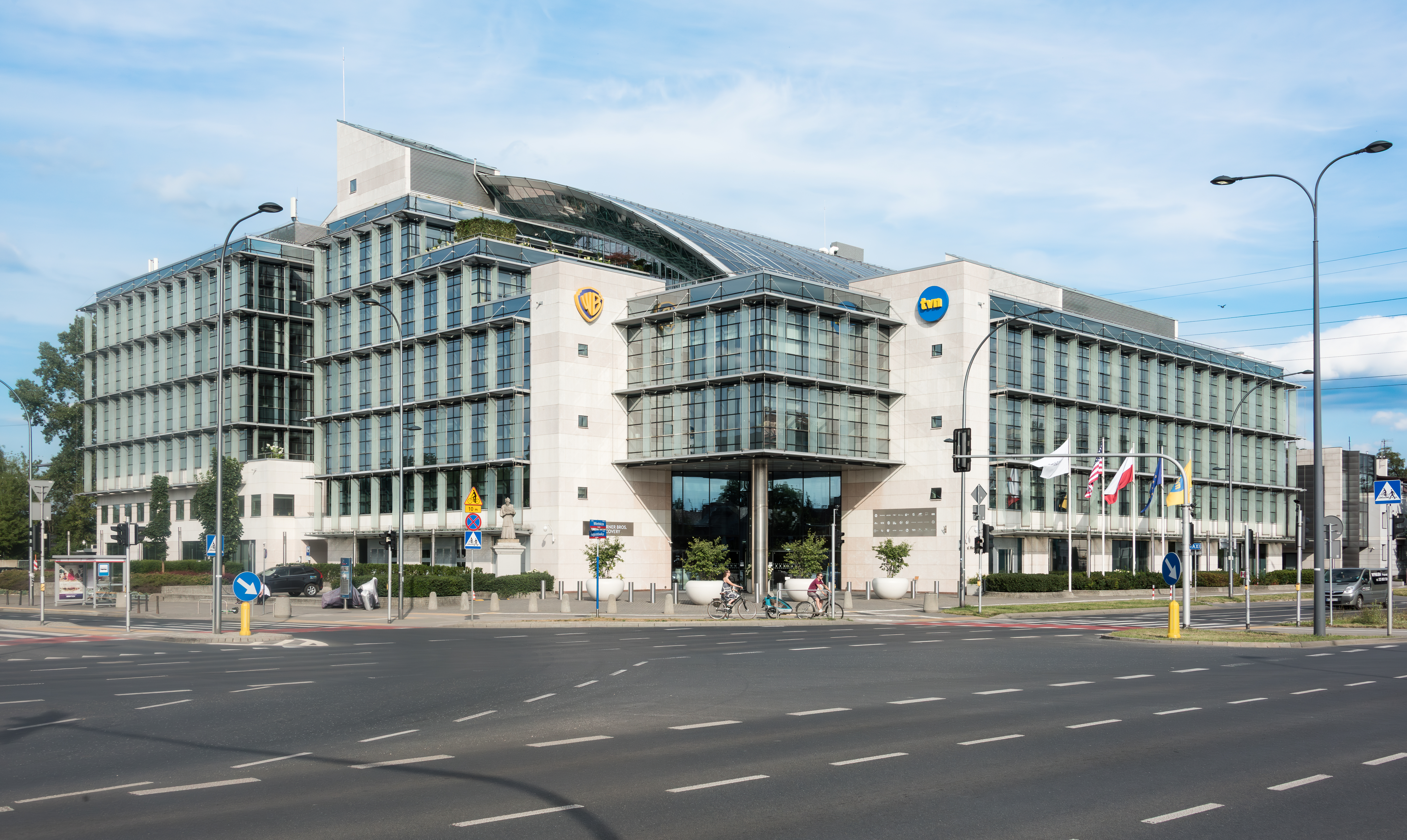
Media Business Centre

Media Business Centre (MBC) is a building located at 166 Wiertnicza Street in Warsaw, Poland. It is located in the part of Warsaw commonly known as Sadyba, on the administrative border of the Mokotów and Wilanów districts). It is the headquarters of the TVN Group and a large part of their subsidiaries. It was built in 2002.

There are two newsrooms in the building. The upper one (on the scale of the whole building located on the first floor, also equipped with mezzanines) is the location of production and broadcasting of TVN's news program Fakty and most of TVN24's programmes. The lower one (on the ground floor) serves as editorial office of TVN24 Biznes i Świat, sometimes it also serves as a reserve or weekend studio of TVN24. The building also houses all weather services provided by TVN Meteo, as well as some programs provided by other channels of the TVN Group, including the TVN Turbo Report.

In the immediate vicinity of the MBC, there are buildings erected by the ITI Group companies prior to the construction of the office building, including the first headquarters of TVN at Augustówka Street. They are still in use.

It has an area of 31000 m², seven overground storeys and two underground storeys. The building won the "Most Intelligent Building of the Year 2003" award.

In 2016, a competition was announced for the development of an architectural concept for the redevelopment of the main entrance area of the Media Business Centre TVN S.A. building, which until then had identified itself with the former owner of TVN – the ITI Group.
