= List of television stations in Poland =

As one of the largest nations in the European Union, Poland today offers a vast diversity of television stations.

== Public channels ==
=== Telewizja Polska ===
| Channel | Type | Polsat Box | Canal+ | Cable | Terrestrial | FTA | Format | Audio language | Online |
|---|---|---|---|---|---|---|---|---|---|
| TVP1* | General | ✓ | ✓ | ✓ | ✓ | ✗ | 16:9 HD | Polish, original | ✓ |
| TVP2* | General | ✓ | ✓ | ✓ | ✓ | ✗ | 16:9 HD | Polish, original | ✓ |
| TVP3* | Regional | ✓ ** | ✓ ** | ✓ | ✓ | ✗ | 16:9 HD | Polish | ✓ |
| TVP Info* | News | ✓ | ✓ | ✓ | ✓ | ✓ | 16:9 HD | Polish | ✓ |
| TVP Sport* | Sport | ✓ | ✓ | ✓ | ✓ | ✗ | 16:9 HD | Polish | ✓ |
| TVP Kultura* | Cultural | ✓ | ✓ | ✓ | ✓ | ✗ | 16:9 HD | Polish, original | ✓ |
| TVP Kultura 2 | Cultural | ✗ | ✗ | ✗ | ✓ **** | ✗ | 16:9 HD | Polish | ✓ |
| TVP Historia* | Documentaries | ✓ | ✓ | ✓ | ✓ | ✗ | 16:9 HD | Polish | ✓ |
| TVP Historia 2 | Documentaries | ✗ | ✗ | ✗ | ✓ **** | ✗ | 16:9 HD | Polish | ✓ |
| TVP Dokument* | Documentaries | ✗ | ✓ | ✓ | ✓ | ✗ | 16:9 HD | Polish, original | ✓ |
| TVP Nauka* | Documentaries | ✓ | ✓ | ✓ | ✓ | ✗ | 16:9 HD | Polish | ✓ |
| TVP ABC* | Children | ✓ | ✓ | ✓ | ✓ | ✗ | 16:9 HD | Polish, original | ✓ |
| Alfa TVP* | Children | ✓ | ✓ | ✓ | ✓ | ✗ | 16:9 HD | Polish, original | ✓ |
| TVP ABC 2 | Children | ✗ | ✗ | ✗ | ✓ ***** | ✗ | 16:9 HD | Polish | ✓ |
| TVP Seriale | Series | ✓ | ✓ | ✓ | ✗ | ✗ | 16:9 HD | Polish | ✓ |
| TVP Rozrywka* | Entertainment | ✓ | ✓ | ✓ | ✓ | ✗ | 16:9 HD | Polish | ✓ |
| TVP Kobieta* | Lifestyle | ✗ | ✗ | ✓ | ✓ | ✗ | 16:9 HD | Polish | ✓ |
| TVP HD | General | ✓ | ✓ | ✓ | ✗ | ✗ | 16:9 HD | Polish, original | ✓ |
| TVP Polonia* | General | ✓ | ✓ | ✓ | ✓ | ✓ | 16:9 HD | Polish | ✓ |
| TVP World | News | ✓ | ✓ | ✓ | ✓ | ✓ | 16:9 HD | English, German | ✓ |
| Belsat* | Belarusian Channel | ✗ | ✗ | ✓ | ✓ | ✓ | 16:9 HD | Belarusian, Ukrainian, Russian | ✓ |
| Sława TV* | Ukrainian Channel | ✗ | ✗ | ✓ | ✓ | ✓ | 16:9 HD | Ukrainian, Russian | ✓ |
| Wot Tak* | Ukrainian Channel | ✗ | ✗ | ✓ | ✓ | ✓ | 16:9 HD | Ukrainian, Russian | ✓ |
| TVP Wilno | Regional, general | ✗ | ✗ | ✗ | ✓ **** | ✗ | 16:9 HD | Polish | ✓ |
| TVP Parlament*** | Parliament | ✗ | ✗ | ✗ | ✓ ***** | ✗ | 16:9 HD | Polish | ✓ |
| Tvpsport.pl*** | Sport | ✗ | ✗ | ✗ | ✓ ***** | ✗ | 16:9 HD | Polish | ✓ |

* SD version of the channel available only in the cable
** In DTH platforms as TVP3 Warszawa
*** Operates as an Internet multistreaming channel
**** Only in Lithuania
***** Only in HbbTV

== Private channels ==
=== Polsat Plus Group ===
| Channel | Type | Polsat Box | Canal+ | Cable | Terrestrial | FTA | Format | Audio language | Online |
|---|---|---|---|---|---|---|---|---|---|
| Polsat | General | ✗ | ✗ | ✓ | ✗ | ✗ | 16:9 SD | Polish | ✗ |
| Polsat X | General | ✓ | ✗ | ✗ | ✗ | ✗ | 16:9 SD | Polish | ✗ |
| Polsat HD | General | ✓ | ✓ | ✓ | ✓ | ✗ | 16:9 HD | Polish | ✗ |
| TV4 | General | ✗ | ✗ | ✓ | ✗ | ✗ | 16:9 SD | Polish | ✗ |
| TV4 HD | General | ✓ | ✓ | ✓ | ✓ | ✗ | 16:9 HD | Polish | ✗ |
| TV6 | Entertainment | ✗ | ✗ | ✓ | ✗ | ✗ | 16:9 SD | Polish | ✗ |
| TV6 HD | Entertainment | ✓ | ✓ | ✓ | ✓ | ✗ | 16:9 HD | Polish | ✗ |
| Polsat 2 HD* | General | ✓ | ✓ | ✓ | ✗ | ✗ | 16:9 HD | Polish | ✗ |
| Polsat News HD* | News | ✓ | ✓ | ✓ | ✓ (encrypted) | ✗ | 16:9 HD | Polish | ✗ |
| Polsat News 2 | News | ✓ | ✓ | ✓ | ✗ | ✗ | 16:9 SD | Polish | ✗ |
| Polsat News Polityka | News | ✓ | ✓ | ✓ | ✓ | ✗ | 16:9 HD | Polish | ✗ |
| Polsat Sport 1 HD* | Sport | ✓ | ✗ | ✓ | ✓ (encrypted) | ✗ | 16:9 HD | Polish | ✗ |
| Polsat Sport 2 HD* | Sport | ✓ | ✗ | ✓ | ✓ (encrypted) | ✗ | 16:9 HD | Polish | ✗ |
| Polsat Sport 3 HD | Sport | ✓ | ✗ | ✓ | ✗ | ✗ | 16:9 HD | Polish | ✗ |
| Polsat Sport Fight HD | Sport | ✓ | ✗ | ✓ | ✗ | ✗ | 16:9 HD | Polish | ✗ |
| Polsat Sport Premium 1 Super HD | Sport | ✓ | ✓ | ✓ | ✗ | ✗ | 16:9 HD | Polish | ✗ |
| Polsat Sport Premium 2 Super HD | Sport | ✓ | ✓ | ✓ | ✗ | ✗ | 16:9 HD | Polish | ✗ |
| Polsat Sport Extra 1 HD | Sport | ✓ | ✓ | ✓ | ✗ | ✗ | 16:9 HD | Polish | ✗ |
| Polsat Sport Extra 2 HD | Sport | ✓ | ✓ | ✓ | ✗ | ✗ | 16:9 HD | Polish | ✗ |
| Polsat Sport Extra 3 HD | Sport | ✓ | ✓ | ✓ | ✗ | ✗ | 16:9 HD | Polish | ✗ |
| Polsat Sport Extra 4 HD | Sport | ✓ | ✓ | ✓ | ✗ | ✗ | 16:9 HD | Polish | ✗ |
| Polsat Games HD | E-sport | ✓ | ✓ | ✓ | ✗ | ✗ | 16:9 HD | Polish | ✓ |
| Polsat Rodzina HD | General | ✓ | ✗ | ✓ | ✗ | ✗ | 16:9 HD | Polish | ✗ |
| Polsat Reality | Reality shows | ✓ | ✗ | ✗ | ✗ | ✗ | 16:9 SD | Polish | ✗ |
| Polsat Cafe HD* | Lifestyle | ✓ | ✓ | ✓ | ✗ | ✗ | 16:9 HD | Polish | ✗ |
| Polsat Play HD* | Lifestyle | ✓ | ✓ | ✓ | ✗ | ✗ | 16:9 HD | Polish | ✗ |
| Polsat Film HD* | Movies | ✓ | ✓ | ✓ | ✗ | ✗ | 16:9 HD | Polish | ✗ |
| Polsat Film 2 | Movies | ✓ | ✗ | ✗ | ✗ | ✗ | 16:9 SD | Polish | ✗ |
| Polsat Seriale HD* | Series | ✓ | ✓ | ✓ | ✗ | ✗ | 16:9 HD | Polish | ✗ |
| Super Polsat | Entertainment | ✗ | ✗ | ✓ | ✗ | ✗ | 16:9 SD | Polish | ✗ |
| Super Polsat HD | Entertainment | ✓ | ✓ | ✓ | ✓ | ✗ | 16:9 HD | Polish | ✗ |
| Polsat Doku HD | Documentaries | ✓ | ✗ | ✓ | ✗ | ✗ | 16:9 HD | Polish | ✗ |
| Polsat JimJam | Children | ✓ | ✓ | ✓ | ✗ | ✗ | 16:9 SD | Polish | ✗ |
| Polsat Viasat Explore HD* | Crime fiction | ✓ | ✓ | ✓ | ✗ | ✗ | 16:9 HD | Polish | ✗ |
| Polsat Viasat History HD* | Documentaries | ✓ | ✓ | ✓ | ✗ | ✗ | 16:9 HD | Polish | ✗ |
| Polsat Viasat Nature HD* | Documentaries | ✓ | ✓ | ✓ | ✗ | ✗ | 16:9 HD | Polish | ✗ |
| Polsat Music HD* | Music | ✓ | ✓ | ✓ | ✗ | ✗ | 16:9 HD | Polish | ✗ |
| Disco Polo Music | Music | ✓ | ✓ | ✓ | ✗ | ✗ | 16:9 SD | Polish | ✗ |
| Wydarzenia 24 HD* | News | ✓ | ✓ | ✓ | ✓ | ✗ | 16:9 HD | Polish | ✗ |
| Nowa TV | General | ✗ | ✗ | ✓ | ✓ | ✗ | 16:9 SD | Polish | ✓ |
| Nowa TV HD | General | ✓ | ✓ | ✓ | ✗ | ✗ | 16:9 HD | Polish | ✗ |
| Fokus TV | Documentaries | ✗ | ✗ | ✓ | ✗ | ✗ | 16:9 SD | Polish | ✓ |
| Fokus TV HD | Documentaries | ✓ | ✓ | ✓ | ✓ | ✗ | 16:9 HD | Polish | ✗ |
| Eska TV | Music | ✗ | ✗ | ✓ | ✗ | ✗ | 16:9 SD | Polish | ✓ |
| Eska TV HD | Music | ✓ | ✓ | ✓ | ✓ | ✗ | 16:9 HD | Polish | ✗ |
| Eska TV Extra | Music | ✗ | ✗ | ✓ | ✗ | ✓ | 16:9 SD | Polish | ✓ |
| Eska TV Extra HD | Music | ✓ | ✓ | ✓ | ✗ | ✗ | 16:9 HD | Polish | ✗ |
| Polo TV | Music | ✗ | ✗ | ✓ | ✗ | ✗ | 16:9 SD | Polish | ✓ |
| Polo TV HD | Music | ✓ | ✓ | ✓ | ✓ | ✗ | 16:9 HD | Polish | ✗ |
| VOX Music TV | Music | ✓ | ✓ | ✓ | ✗ | ✗ | 16:9 SD | Polish | ✓ |
| Eska Rock TV | Music | ✓ | ✓ | ✓ | ✗ | ✗ | 16:9 SD | Polish | ✗ |
| 4fun.tv | Music | ✓ | ✓ | ✓ | ✗ | ✓ | 16:9 SD | Polish | ✓ |
| 4fun Kids | Music | ✓ | ✓ | ✓ | ✗ | ✓ | 16:9 SD | Polish | ✓ |
| 4fun Dance | Music | ✓ | ✓ | ✓ | ✗ | ✓ | 16:9 SD | Polish | ✓ |
| Mango | Teleshopping | ✓ | ✓ | ✓ | ✗ | ✓ | 16:9 SD | Polish | ✓ |
| TV Okazje | Teleshopping | ✓ | ✓ | ✓ | ✗ | ✓ | 16:9 SD | Polish | ✓ |
| Eleven Sports 1 HD | Sport | ✓ | ✓ | ✓ | ✓ (encrypted) | ✗ | 16:9 HD | Polish | ✓ |
| Eleven Sports 1 4K | Sport | ✓ | ✓ | ✓ | ✗ | ✗ | 16:9 4K | Polish | ✗ |
| Eleven Sports 2 HD | Sport | ✓ | ✓ | ✓ | ✓ (encrypted) | ✗ | 16:9 HD | Polish | ✓ |
| Eleven Sports 3 HD | Sport | ✓ | ✓ | ✓ | ✗ | ✗ | 16:9 HD | Polish | ✓ |
| Eleven Sports 4 HD | Sport | ✗ | ✓ | ✓ | ✗ | ✗ | 16:9 HD | Polish | ✓ |
| Eleven Extra HD | Sport | ✗ | ✓ | ✓ | ✗ | ✗ | 16:9 HD | Polish | ✓ |

* SD version of the channel available only in the cable

=== TVN Grupa Skydance ===
| Channel | Type | Polsat Box | Canal+ | Cable | Terrestrial | FTA | Format | Audio language | Online |
|---|---|---|---|---|---|---|---|---|---|
| TVN | General | ✗ | ✗ | ✓ | ✗ | ✗ | 16:9 SD | Polish, original | ✓ |
| TVN HD | General | ✓ | ✓ | ✓ | ✓ | ✗ | 16:9 HD | Polish, original | ✓ |
| TVN7 | General | ✗ | ✗ | ✓ | ✗ | ✗ | 16:9 SD | Polish, original | ✓ |
| TVN7 HD | General | ✓ | ✓ | ✓ | ✓ | ✗ | 16:9 HD | Polish, original | ✓ |
| TVN24 HD* | News | ✓ | ✓ | ✓ | ✓ (encrypted) | ✗ | 16:9 HD | Polish | ✓ |
| TVN24 BiS HD* | News | ✓ | ✓ | ✓ | ✗ | ✗ | 16:9 HD | Polish | ✓ |
| CNN International | News | ✓ | ✓ | ✓ | ✗ | ✗ | 16:9 HD | English | ✓ |
| TVN Fabuła HD | Series and movies | ✓ | ✓ | ✓ | ✗ | ✗ | 16:9 HD | Polish | ✓ |
| TVN Style HD* | Lifestyle | ✓ | ✓ | ✓ | ✓ (encrypted) | ✗ | 16:9 HD | Polish, original | ✓ |
| TVN Turbo HD* | Lifestyle | ✓ | ✓ | ✓ | ✓ (encrypted) | ✗ | 16:9 HD | Polish, original | ✓ |
| TTV** | Social-intervention | ✗ | ✗ | ✓ | ✗ | ✗ | 16:9 SD | Polish | ✓ |
| TTV HD** | Social-intervention | ✓ | ✓ | ✓ | ✓ | ✗ | 16:9 HD | Polish | ✓ |
| HGTV HD* | Home design, gardening | ✓ | ✓ | ✓ | ✗ | ✗ | 16:9 HD | Polish | ✓ |
| Food Network HD* | Food | ✓ | ✓ | ✓ | ✗ | ✗ | 16:9 HD | Polish | ✓ |
| Travel Channel HD* | Documentaries | ✓ | ✓ | ✓ | ✗ | ✗ | 16:9 HD | Polish, English | ✓ |
| Discovery Channel HD* | Documentaries | ✓ | ✓ | ✓ | ✗ | ✗ | 16:9 HD | Polish, English | ✓ |
| Discovery Science HD* | Documentaries | ✓ | ✓ | ✓ | ✗ | ✗ | 16:9 HD | Polish, English | ✓ |
| DTX HD* | Lifestyle | ✓ | ✓ | ✓ | ✗ | ✗ | 16:9 HD | Polish, English | ✓ |
| TLC HD* | Lifestyle | ✓ | ✓ | ✓ | ✗ | ✗ | 16:9 HD | Polish, English | ✓ |
| ID HD* | Documentaries | ✓ | ✓ | ✓ | ✗ | ✗ | 16:9 HD | Polish, English | ✓ |
| Discovery Historia | Documentaries | ✓ | ✓ | ✓ | ✗ | ✗ | 16:9 SD | Polish, English | ✓ |
| Discovery Life HD* | Health | ✓ | ✓ | ✓ | ✗ | ✗ | 16:9 HD | Polish, English | ✓ |
| Animal Planet HD | Documentaries | ✓ | ✓ | ✓ | ✗ | ✗ | 16:9 HD | Polish, English | ✓ |
| Metro | General/Lifestyle | ✗ | ✗ | ✓ | ✗ | ✗ | 16:9 SD | Polish | ✓ |
| Metro HD | General/Lifestyle | ✓ | ✓ | ✓ | ✗ | ✗ | 16:9 HD | Polish | ✓ |
| Eurosport 1 HD* | Sport | ✓ | ✓ | ✓ | ✓ (encrypted) | ✗ | 16:9 HD | Polish, English | ✓ |
| Eurosport 2 HD* | Sport | ✓ | ✓ | ✓ | ✓ (encrypted) | ✗ | 16:9 HD | Polish, English | ✓ |
| Eurosport 3 HD* | Sport | ✓ | ✗ | ✓ | ✗ | ✗ | 16:9 HD | Polish, English | ✗ |
| Eurosport 4 HD* | Sport | ✓ | ✗ | ✓ | ✗ | ✗ | 16:9 HD | Polish, English | ✗ |
| Eurosport 4K* | Sport | ✗ | ✗ | ✓ | ✗ | ✗ | 16:9 4K | Polish, English | ✗ |
| Warner TV HD* | Movies | ✓ | ✓ | ✓ | ✗ | ✗ | 16:9 HD | Polish, English | ✓ |
| Cartoon Network HD* | Children | ✓ | ✓ | ✓ | ✗ | ✗ | 16:9 HD | Polish, English | ✓ |
| Cartoonito HD* | Children | ✓ | ✓ | ✓ | ✗ | ✗ | 16:9 HD | Polish, English | ✓ |
| HBO | Movies | ✓ | ✓ | ✓ | ✗ | ✗ | 16:9 HD | Polish, English | ✓ |
| HBO 2 | Movies | ✓ | ✓ | ✓ | ✗ | ✗ | 16:9 HD | Polish, English | ✓ |
| HBO 3 | Movies | ✓ | ✓ | ✓ | ✗ | ✗ | 16:9 HD | Polish, English | ✓ |
| Cinemax | Movies | ✓ | ✓ | ✓ | ✗ | ✗ | 16:9 HD | Polish, English | ✓ |
| Cinemax 2 | Movies | ✓ | ✓ | ✓ | ✗ | ✗ | 16:9 HD | Polish, English | ✓ |
| Paramount Network HD | Movies | ✓ | ✓ | ✓ | ✗ | ✗ | 16:9 HD | Polish | ✗ |
| Comedy Central HD* | Series | ✓ | ✓ | ✓ | ✗ | ✗ | 16:9 HD | Polish | ✗ |
| Nickelodeon | Children | ✓ | ✓ | ✓ | ✗ | ✗ | 16:9 SD | Polish | ✗ |
| Nicktoons HD | Children | ✓ | ✓ | ✓ | ✗ | ✗ | 16:9 HD | Polish | ✗ |
| Nick Jr. | Children | ✓ | ✓ | ✓ | ✗ | ✗ | 16:9 SD | Polish | ✗ |
| MTV Polska HD* | Entertainment | ✓ | ✓ | ✓ | ✗ | ✗ | 16:9 HD | Polish | ✗ |

* SD version of the channel available only in the cable
** TTV belongs to Stavka (51% — TVN Discovery, 49% — Besta Film)

=== Telewizja Puls ===
| Channel | Type | Polsat Box | Canal+ | Cable | Terrestrial | FTA | Format | Audio language | Online |
|---|---|---|---|---|---|---|---|---|---|
| TV Puls HD | General | ✓ | ✓ | ✓ | ✓ | ✗ | 16:9 HD | Polish | ✓ |
| Puls 2 HD | Entertainment | ✓ | ✓ | ✓ | ✓ | ✗ | 16:9 HD | Polish | ✓ |

=== Canal+ Polska ===
| Channel | Type | Polsat Box | Canal+ | Cable | Terrestrial | FTA | Format | Audio language | Online |
|---|---|---|---|---|---|---|---|---|---|
| Canal+ Premium* | Sport and movies | ✗ | ✓ | ✓ | ✗ | ✗ | 16:9 HD | Polish, original | ✓ |
| Canal+ 1 HD* | Sport and movies | ✗ | ✓ | ✓ | ✗ | ✗ | 16:9 HD | Polish, original | ✓ |
| Canal+ 4K Ultra HD | 4K | ✗ | ✓ | ✗ | ✗ | ✗ | 16:9 4K | Polish | ✓ |
| Canal+ Sport HD* | Sport | ✗ | ✓ | ✓ | ✗ | ✗ | 16:9 HD | Polish | ✓ |
| Canal+ Sport 2 HD | Sport | ✗ | ✓ | ✓ | ✗ | ✗ | 16:9 HD | Polish | ✓ |
| Canal+ Sport 3 HD | Sport | ✗ | ✓ | ✗ | ✗ | ✗ | 16:9 HD | Polish | ✓ |
| Canal+ Sport 4 HD | Sport | ✗ | ✓ | ✗ | ✗ | ✗ | 16:9 HD | Polish | ✓ |
| Canal+ Sport 5 HD* | Sport | ✗ | ✓ | ✓ | ✗ | ✗ | 16:9 HD | Polish | ✓ |
| Canal+ Sport 6 HD | Sport | ✗ | ✓ | ✗ | ✗ | ✗ | 16:9 HD | Polish | ✓ |
| Canal+ Sport 7 HD | Sport | ✗ | ✓ | ✗ | ✗ | ✗ | 16:9 HD | Polish | ✓ |
| Canal+ 360 HD* | Sport | ✗ | ✓ | ✓ | ✗ | ✗ | 16:9 HD | Polish | ✓ |
| Canal+ Extra 1 HD | Sport | ✗ | ✓ | ✓ | ✗ | ✗ | 16:9 HD | Polish | ✓ |
| Canal+ Extra 2 HD | Sport | ✗ | ✓ | ✓ | ✗ | ✗ | 16:9 HD | Polish | ✓ |
| Canal+ Extra 3 HD | Sport | ✗ | ✓ | ✓ | ✗ | ✗ | 16:9 HD | Polish | ✓ |
| Canal+ Extra 4 HD* | Sport | ✗ | ✓ | ✓ | ✗ | ✗ | 16:9 HD | Polish | ✓ |
| Canal+ Extra 5 HD | Sport | ✗ | ✓ | ✓ | ✗ | ✗ | 16:9 HD | Polish | ✓ |
| Canal+ Extra 6 HD | Sport | ✗ | ✓ | ✓ | ✗ | ✗ | 16:9 HD | Polish | ✓ |
| Canal+ Extra 7 HD | Sport | ✗ | ✓ | ✓ | ✗ | ✗ | 16:9 HD | Polish | ✓ |
| Canal+ Extra 8 HD | Sport | ✗ | ✓ | ✓ | ✗ | ✗ | 16:9 HD | Polish | ✗ |
| Canal+ Extra 9 HD | Sport | ✗ | ✓ | ✓ | ✗ | ✗ | 16:9 HD | Polish | ✗ |
| Canal+ Extra 10 HD | Sport | ✗ | ✓ | ✓ | ✗ | ✗ | 16:9 HD | Polish | ✗ |
| Canal+ Extra 11 HD | Sport | ✗ | ✓ | ✓ | ✗ | ✗ | 16:9 HD | Polish | ✗ |
| Canal+ Extra 12 HD | Sport | ✗ | ✓ | ✓ | ✗ | ✗ | 16:9 HD | Polish | ✗ |
| Canal+ Extra 13 HD | Sport | ✗ | ✓ | ✓ | ✗ | ✗ | 16:9 HD | Polish | ✗ |
| Canal+ Extra 14 HD | Sport | ✗ | ✓ | ✓ | ✗ | ✗ | 16:9 HD | Polish | ✗ |
| Canal+ Extra 15 HD | Sport | ✗ | ✓ | ✓ | ✗ | ✗ | 16:9 HD | Polish | ✗ |
| Canal+ Extra 16 HD | Sport | ✗ | ✓ | ✓ | ✗ | ✗ | 16:9 HD | Polish | ✗ |
| Canal+ Extra 17 HD | Sport | ✗ | ✓ | ✓ | ✗ | ✗ | 16:9 HD | Polish | ✗ |
| Canal+ Extra 18 HD | Sport | ✗ | ✓ | ✓ | ✗ | ✗ | 16:9 HD | Polish | ✗ |
| Canal+ NOW HD | Sport | ✗ | ✓ | ✗ | ✗ | ✗ | 16:9 HD | Polish | ✓ |
| Canal+ Film HD* | Movies | ✗ | ✓ | ✓ | ✗ | ✗ | 16:9 HD | Polish, original | ✓ |
| Canal+ Seriale HD* | Series | ✗ | ✓ | ✓ | ✗ | ✗ | 16:9 HD | Polish, original | ✓ |
| Canal+ Dokument HD | Documentaries | ✗ | ✓ | ✓ | ✗ | ✗ | 16:9 HD | Polish, original | ✓ |
| Canal+ Kuchnia HD* | Lifestyle | ✗ | ✓ | ✓ | ✗ | ✗ | 16:9 HD | Polish | ✓ |
| Canal+ Domo HD* | Lifestyle | ✗ | ✓ | ✓ | ✗ | ✗ | 16:9 HD | Polish, original | ✓ |
| Ale Kino+ HD* | Movies | ✗ | ✓ | ✓ | ✗ | ✗ | 16:9 HD | Polish, original | ✓ |
| Planete+ HD* | Documentaries | ✗ | ✓ | ✓ | ✗ | ✗ | 16:9 HD | Polish | ✓ |
| MiniMini+ HD* | Children | ✗ | ✓ | ✓ | ✗ | ✗ | 16:9 HD | Polish, original | ✓ |
| TeleToon+ HD* | Teens | ✗ | ✓ | ✓ | ✗ | ✗ | 16:9 HD | Polish | ✓ |
| Novelas+ HD | Dramas | ✗ | ✓ | ✓ | ✗ | ✗ | 16:9 HD | Polish | ✓ |
| Novelas+1 HD | Dramas | ✗ | ✓ | ✓ | ✗ | ✗ | 16:9 HD | Polish | ✓ |
| Stopklatka | Movies | ✓ | ✓ | ✓ | ✓ | ✗ | 16:9 SD | Polish | ✓ |
| Stopklatka HD | Movies | ✗ | ✗ | ✓ | ✗ | ✗ | 16:9 HD | Polish | ✓ |
| Kino Polska HD* | Movies / Series | ✓ | ✓ | ✓ | ✗ | ✗ | 16:9 HD | Polish | ✓ |
| Kino Polska Muzyka | Music | ✓ | ✓ | ✓ | ✗ | ✗ | 16:9 SD | Polish | ✓ |
| Zoom | General | ✓ | ✓ | ✓ | ✓ | ✗ | 16:9 SD | Polish | ✓ |
| Zoom HD | General | ✗ | ✗ | ✓ | ✗ | ✗ | 16:9 HD | Polish | ✓ |
| FilmBox+ One HD* | Movies | ✓ | ✓ | ✓ | ✗ | ✗ | 16:9 HD | Polish | ✓ |
| FilmBox+ Hits HD* | Movies | ✓ | ✓ | ✓ | ✗ | ✗ | 16:9 HD | Polish | ✓ |
| FilmBox+ Emotion HD* | Movies | ✓ | ✓ | ✓ | ✗ | ✗ | 16:9 HD | Polish | ✓ |
| FilmBox+ Comedy HD | Movies | ✓ | ✓ | ✓ | ✗ | ✗ | 16:9 HD | Polish | ✓ |
| FilmBox+ Festival HD | Movies | ✗ | ✗ | ✓ | ✗ | ✗ | 16:9 HD | Polish | ✓ |
| FilmBox+ Action HD | Movies | ✓ | ✓ | ✓ | ✗ | ✗ | 16:9 HD | Polish | ✓ |
| FightBox HD* | Sport | ✓ | ✓ | ✓ | ✗ | ✗ | 16:9 HD | Polish | ✓ |
| DocuBox | Documentaries | ✗ | ✗ | ✓ | ✗ | ✗ | 16:9 SD | English | ✓ |
| DocuBox HD | Documentaries | ✗ | ✗ | ✓ | ✗ | ✗ | 16:9 HD | English | ✓ |
| Gametoon HD | E-sport | ✗ | ✗ | ✓ | ✗ | ✗ | 16:9 HD | Polish | ✓ |
| Fast&FunBox HD | Extreme sport | ✗ | ✗ | ✓ | ✗ | ✗ | 16:9 HD | English | ✓ |
| FashionBox HD | Fashion | ✗ | ✗ | ✓ | ✗ | ✗ | 16:9 HD | English | ✓ |
| 360TuneBox HD | Music | ✗ | ✗ | ✓ | ✗ | ✗ | 16:9 HD | English | ✓ |
| FunBox UHD | Entertainment | ✗ | ✗ | ✓ | ✗ | ✗ | 16:9 4K | English | ✓ |

* SD version of the channel available only in the cable

=== BBC Studios ===
| Channel | Type | Polsat Box | Canal+ | Cable | Terrestrial | FTA | Format | Audio language | Online |
|---|---|---|---|---|---|---|---|---|---|
| BBC News | News | ✓ | ✓ | ✓ | ✗ | ✗ | 16:9 HD | English | ✓ |
| BBC First HD | Series | ✓ | ✓ | ✓ | ✗ | ✗ | 16:9 HD | Polish, English | ✗ |
| BBC Brit HD* | Entertainment | ✓ | ✓ | ✓ | ✗ | ✗ | 16:9 HD | Polish, English | ✗ |
| CBeebies | Children | ✓ | ✓ | ✓ | ✗ | ✗ | 16:9 SD | Polish, English | ✗ |
| BBC Earth HD* | Documentaries | ✓ | ✓ | ✓ | ✗ | ✗ | 16:9 HD | Polish, English | ✗ |
| BBC Lifestyle HD* | Lifestyle | ✓ | ✓ | ✓ | ✗ | ✗ | 16:9 HD | Polish, English | ✗ |

* SD version of the channel available only in the cable

=== Comcast ===
| Channel | Type | Polsat Box | Canal+ | Cable | Terrestrial | FTA | Format | Audio language | Online |
|---|---|---|---|---|---|---|---|---|---|
| Sky News | News | ✓ | ✓ | ✓ | ✗ | ✗ | 16:9 HD | English | ✓ |
| CNBC Europe | News | ✓ | ✓ | ✓ | ✗ | ✗ | 16:9 HD | English | ✓ |
| SkyShowtime 1 HD | Series and movies | ✓ | ✓ | ✓ | ✗ | ✗ | 16:9 HD | Polish | ✗ |
| SkyShowtime 2 HD | Series and movies | ✓ | ✓ | ✓ | ✗ | ✗ | 16:9 HD | Polish | ✗ |
| 13 Ulica | Series | ✓ | ✓ | ✓ | ✗ | ✗ | 16:9 SD | Polish, English | ✗ |
| 13 Ulica HD* | Series | ✓ | ✓ | ✓ | ✗ | ✗ | 16:9 HD | Polish, English | ✗ |
| SCI FI | Series / Movies | ✓ | ✓ | ✓ | ✗ | ✗ | 16:9 SD | Polish, English | ✗ |
| SCI FI HD* | Series / Movies | ✓ | ✓ | ✓ | ✗ | ✗ | 16:9 HD | Polish, English | ✗ |
| E! Entertainment | Entertainment | ✓ | ✓ | ✓ | ✗ | ✗ | 16:9 SD | Polish, English | ✗ |
| E! Entertainment HD* | Entertainment | ✓ | ✓ | ✓ | ✗ | ✗ | 16:9 HD | Polish, English | ✗ |

=== The Walt Disney Company ===
| Channel | Type | Polsat Box | Canal+ | Cable | Terrestrial | FTA | Format | Audio language | Online |
|---|---|---|---|---|---|---|---|---|---|
| Disney Channel HD* | Children | ✓ | ✓ | ✓ | ✗ | ✗ | 16:9 HD | Polish, English | ✗ |
| Disney XD | Children | ✓ | ✓ | ✓ | ✗ | ✗ | 16:9 SD | Polish | ✗ |
| Disney Jr. | Children | ✓ | ✓ | ✓ | ✗ | ✗ | 16:9 SD | Polish | ✗ |
| FX HD* | Series | ✓ | ✓ | ✓ | ✗ | ✗ | 16:9 HD | Polish, English | ✗ |
| FX Comedy HD* | Series | ✓ | ✓ | ✓ | ✗ | ✗ | 16:9 HD | Polish, English | ✗ |
| National Geographic HD* | Documentaries | ✓ | ✓ | ✓ | ✗ | ✗ | 16:9 HD | Polish, English | ✗ |
| National Geographic Wild HD* | Documentaries | ✓ | ✓ | ✓ | ✗ | ✗ | 16:9 HD | Polish, English | ✗ |
| Nat Geo People HD | Lifestyle | ✓ | ✓ | ✓ | ✗ | ✗ | 16:9 HD | Polish, English | ✗ |
| Baby TV | Children | ✗ | ✓ | ✓ | ✗ | ✗ | 16:9 SD | Polish, German, English, French, Dutch, Turkish, Spanish, Portuguese, Greek, Italian | ✗ |

* SD version of the channel available only in the cable

=== Music Box Group ===
| Channel | Type | Polsat Box | Canal+ | Cable | Terrestrial | FTA | Format | Audio language | Online |
|---|---|---|---|---|---|---|---|---|---|
| Music Box Polska | Music | ✗ | ✗ | ✓ | ✗ | ✗ | 16:9 SD | Polish | ✓ |
| Music Box Classic | Music | ✗ | ✗ | ✓ | ✗ | ✗ | 16:9 SD | Polish | ✗ |
| Music Box Dance | Music | ✗ | ✗ | ✓ | ✗ | ✗ | 16:9 SD | Polish | ✗ |
| Music Box Hits | Music | ✗ | ✗ | ✓ | ✗ | ✗ | 16:9 SD | Polish | ✗ |
| Music Box Sexy | Music | ✗ | ✗ | ✓ | ✗ | ✗ | 16:9 SD | Polish | ✗ |

=== MWE Global Media ===
| Channel | Type | Polsat Box | Canal+ | Cable | Terrestrial | FTA | Format | Audio language | Online |
|---|---|---|---|---|---|---|---|---|---|
| Antena | General | ✗ | ✓ | ✓ | ? | ✓ | 16:9 SD | Polish | ✗ |
| Antena HD | General | ✗ | ✗ | ✓ | ? | ✗ | 16:9 HD | Polish | ✗ |
| Pogoda24.tv | Weather | ✓ | ✓ | ✓ | ✗ | ✓ | 16:9 SD | Polish | ✗ |
| Ultra TV 4K | General | ✗ | ✗ | ✓ | ✗ | ✗ | 16:9 4K | Polish | ✗ |
| Filmax | Movies | ✗ | ✗ | ✓ | ✗ | ✗ | 16:9 SD | Polish | ✓ |
| Filmax HD | Movies | ✗ | ✗ | ✓ | ✗ | ✗ | 16:9 HD | Polish | ✗ |
| Filmax 4K | Movies | ✗ | ✗ | ✓ | ✗ | ✗ | 16:9 4K | Polish | ✗ |
| Filmax Café | Movies | ✓ | ✓ | ✓ | ✗ | ✗ | 16:9 SD | Polish | ✓ |
| Filmax Café HD | Movies | ✓ | ✓ | ✓ | ✗ | ✗ | 16:9 HD | Polish | ✓ |
| Filmax Comedy | Series | ✓ | ✓ | ✓ | ✗ | ✓ | 16:9 SD | Polish | ✗ |
| Filmax Comedy HD | Series | ✓ | ✓ | ✓ | ✗ | ✓ | 16:9 HD | Polish | ✗ |
| Adventure HD* | Documentaries | ✗ | ✓ | ✓ | ✗ | ✗ | 16:9 HD | Polish | ✗ |
| Golf Zone | Sport | ✓ | ✓ | ✓ | ✗ | ✗ | 16:9 SD | Polish | ✗ |
| Golf Zone HD | Sport | ✓ | ✓ | ✓ | ✗ | ✗ | 16:9 HD | Polish | ✗ |
| Xtreme TV | Documentaries | ✗ | ✗ | ✓ | ✗ | ✗ | 16:9 SD | Polish | ✗ |
| Xtreme TV HD | Documentaries | ✗ | ✗ | ✓ | ✗ | ✗ | 16:9 HD | Polish | ✗ |
| Music Live HD (Music Xmas/Valentine/Summer) | Music | ✓ | ✓ | ✓ | ✗ | ✓ | 16:9 HD | Polish | ✗ |
| Music 80s | Music | ✓ | ✓ | ✓ | ✗ | ✓ | 16:9 SD | Polish | ✗ |
| Music 80s HD | Music | ✓ | ✓ | ✓ | ✗ | ✓ | 16:9 HD | Polish | ✗ |
| Music 90s | Music | ✓ | ✓ | ✓ | ✗ | ✓ | 16:9 SD | Polish | ✗ |
| Music 90s HD | Music | ✓ | ✓ | ✓ | ✗ | ✓ | 16:9 HD | Polish | ✗ |
| Music 00s | Music | ✓ | ✓ | ✓ | ✗ | ✓ | 16:9 SD | Polish | ✗ |
| Music 00s HD | Music | ✓ | ✓ | ✓ | ✗ | ✓ | 16:9 HD | Polish | ✗ |
| Music Club | Music | ✓ | ✓ | ✓ | ✗ | ✓ | 16:9 SD | Polish | ✗ |
| Music Club HD | Music | ✓ | ✓ | ✓ | ✗ | ✓ | 16:9 HD | Polish | ✗ |
| Music Hits | Music | ✓ | ✓ | ✓ | ✗ | ✓ | 16:9 SD | Polish | ✗ |
| Music Hits HD | Music | ✓ | ✓ | ✓ | ✗ | ✓ | 16:9 HD | Polish | ✗ |
| Nuta.TV to be replaced by Music TV on December 1, 2026 | Music | ✗ | ✓ | ✓ | ✗ | ✓ | 16:9 SD | Polish | ✗ |
| Nuta.TV HD to be replaced by Music TV HD on December 1, 2026 | Music | ✗ | ✗ | ✓ | ✗ | ✗ | 16:9 HD | Polish | ✗ |
| Nuta Gold to be replaced by Music Gold on December 1, 2026 | Music | ✗ | ✓ | ✓ | ✗ | ✓ | 16:9 SD | Polish | ✓ |
| Nuta Gold HD to be replaced by Music Gold HD on December 1, 2026 | Music | ✗ | ✗ | ✓ | ✗ | ✗ | 16:9 HD | Polish | ✗ |
| Power TV | Music | ✗ | ✓ | ✓ | ✗ | ✓ | 16:9 SD | Polish | ✗ |
| Power TV HD | Music | ✗ | ✗ | ✓ | ✗ | ✗ | 16:9 HD | Polish | ✗ |
| Szlagier TV | Music | ✗ | ✓ | ✓ | ✗ | ✓ | 16:9 SD | Polish | ✗ |
| Szlagier TV HD | Music | ✗ | ✗ | ✓ | ✗ | ✗ | 16:9 HD | Polish | ✗ |
| Junior Music | Music | ✓ | ✓ | ✓ | ✗ | ✗ | 16:9 SD | Polish | ✗ |
| Junior Music HD | Music | ✓ | ✓ | ✓ | ✗ | ✗ | 16:9 HD | Polish | ✗ |
| Top Kids | Children | ✗ | ✗ | ✓ | ✗ | ✗ | 16:9 SD | Polish | ✗ |
| Top Kids HD | Children | ✗ | ✗ | ✓ | ✗ | ✗ | 16:9 HD | Polish | ✗ |
| Junior Channel | Children | ✗ | ✗ | ✓ | ✗ | ✗ | 16:9 SD | Polish | ✗ |
| Junior Channel HD | Children | ✗ | ✗ | ✓ | ✗ | ✗ | 16:9 HD | Polish | ✗ |
| Pixel TV | Anime | ✓ | ✓ | ✓ | ✗ | ✓ | 16:9 SD | Polish | ✗ |
| Pixel TV HD | Anime | ✓ | ✓ | ✓ | ✗ | ✓ | 16:9 HD | Polish | ✗ |
| Home TV | Lifestyle | ✗ | ✓ | ✓ | ✗ | ✗ | 16:9 SD | Polish | ✗ |
| Home TV HD | Lifestyle | ✗ | ✗ | ✓ | ✗ | ✗ | 16:9 HD | Polish | ✗ |
| TVC | Entertainment | ✓ | ✓ | ✓ | ✗ | ✓ | 16:9 SD | Polish | ✗ |
| TVC HD | Entertainment | ✗ | ✗ | ✓ | ✗ | ✗ | 16:9 HD | Polish | ✗ |
| TVC Super | Entertainment | ✗ | ✓ | ✓ | ✗ | ✓ | 16:9 SD | Polish | ✗ |
| TVC Super HD | Entertainment | ✗ | ✗ | ✓ | ✗ | ✗ | 16:9 HD | Polish | ✗ |
| TVC Reality | Entertainment | ✓ | ✓ | ✓ | ✗ | ✗ | 16:9 SD | Polish | ✗ |
| TVC Reality HD | Entertainment | ✓ | ✓ | ✓ | ✗ | ✗ | 16:9 HD | Polish | ✗ |
| Mesjasz TV | Religion | ✓ | ✗ | ✓ | ✗ | ✓ | 16:9 SD | Polish | ✗ |
| Mesjasz TV HD | Religion | ✗ | ✗ | ✓ | ✗ | ✗ | 16:9 HD | Polish | ✗ |

* SD version of the channel available only in the cable

=== Polcast Television ===
| Channel | Type | Polsat Box | Canal+ | Cable | Terrestrial | FTA | Format | Audio language | Online |
|---|---|---|---|---|---|---|---|---|---|
| Tele 5 | General | ✓ | ✓ | ✓ | ✗ | ✓ | 16:9 SD | Polish | ✗ |
| Tele 5 HD | General | ✗ | ✗ | ✓ | ✗ | ✗ | 16:9 HD | Polish | ✗ |
| Polonia 1 | General / Teleshopping | ✓ | ✓ | ✓ | ✗ | ✓ | 16:9 SD | Polish | ✗ |
| Water Planet | Documentaries | ✓ | ✗ | ✓ | ✗ | ✗ | 16:9 SD | Polish | ✗ |
| Water Planet HD | Documentaries | ✗ | ✗ | ✓ | ✗ | ✗ | 16:9 HD | Polish | ✗ |
| Novela TV | Series | ✓ | ✗ | ✓ | ✗ | ✗ | 16:9 SD | Polish | ✗ |
| Novela TV HD | Series | ✗ | ✗ | ✓ | ✗ | ✗ | 16:9 HD | Polish | ✗ |

=== AMC Global Media ===
| Channel | Type | Polsat Box | Canal+ | Cable | Terrestrial | FTA | Format | Audio language | Online |
|---|---|---|---|---|---|---|---|---|---|
| AMC | Movies | ✓ | ✓ | ✓ | ✗ | ✗ | 16:9 SD | Polish, English | ✗ |
| AMC HD | Movies | ✓ | ✓ | ✓ | ✗ | ✗ | 16:9 HD | Polish, English | ✗ |
| Sundance TV to be replaced by FilmMania on December 1, 2026 | Movies | ✓ | ✓ | ✓ | ✗ | ✗ | 16:9 SD | Polish, English | ✗ |
| SundanceTV HD* to be replaced by FilmMania HD on December 1, 2026 | Movies | ✓ | ✓ | ✓ | ✗ | ✗ | 16:9 HD | Polish, English | ✗ |
| Extreme Channel | Extreme sport | ✓ | ✓ | ✓ | ✗ | ✗ | 16:9 SD | Polish | ✗ |
| Extreme Channel HD* | Extreme sport | ✓ | ✓ | ✓ | ✗ | ✗ | 16:9 HD | Polish | ✗ |

=== Antenna Group ===
| Channel | Type | Polsat Box | Canal+ | Cable | Terrestrial | FTA | Format | Audio language | Online |
|---|---|---|---|---|---|---|---|---|---|
| AXN | Series | ✓ | ✗ | ✓ | ✗ | ✗ | 16:9 SD | Polish | ✗ |
| AXN HD | Series | ✓ | ✓ | ✓ | ✗ | ✗ | 16:9 HD | Polish, original | ✗ |
| AXN Spin | Lifestyle | ✓ | ✓ | ✓ | ✗ | ✗ | 16:9 SD | Polish | ✗ |
| AXN Spin HD* | Lifestyle | ✓ | ✓ | ✓ | ✗ | ✗ | 16:9 HD | Polish, original | ✗ |
| AXN Black | Series | ✓ | ✓ | ✓ | ✗ | ✗ | 16:9 SD | Polish | ✗ |
| AXN White | Series | ✓ | ✓ | ✓ | ✗ | ✗ | 16:9 SD | Polish | ✗ |

=== Others ===
| Channel | Type | Polsat Box | Canal+ | Cable | Terrestrial | FTA | Format | Audio language | Online |
|---|---|---|---|---|---|---|---|---|---|
| WP | General | ✓ | ✓ | ✓ | ✓ | ✗ | 16:9 SD | Polish | ✓ |
| WP HD | General | ✗ | ✗ | ✓ | ✗ | ✗ | 16:9 HD | Polish | ✗ |
| Kabaret TV | Entertainment | ✗ | ✗ | ✓ | ✗ | ✗ | 16:9 SD | Polish | ✓ |
| Kabaret TV HD | Entertainment | ✗ | ✗ | ✓ | ✗ | ✗ | 16:9 HD | Polish | ✗ |
| History | Documentaries | ✓ | ✓ | ✓ | ✗ | ✗ | 16:9 SD | Polish, English | ✗ |
| History HD* | Documentaries | ✓ | ✓ | ✓ | ✗ | ✗ | 16:9 HD | Polish, English | ✗ |
| History 2 | Documentaries | ✓ | ✓ | ✓ | ✗ | ✗ | 16:9 SD | Polish, English | ✗ |
| History2 HD | Documentaries | ✓ | ✓ | ✓ | ✗ | ✗ | 16:9 HD | Polish, English | ✗ |
| Crime+Investigation Polsat | True crime | ✓ | ✓ | ✓ | ✗ | ✗ | 16:9 SD | Polish | ✗ |
| Crime+Investigation Polsat HD* | True crime | ✓ | ✓ | ✓ | ✗ | ✗ | 16:9 HD | Polish | ✗ |
| Viasat Epic Drama HD | Historical drama | ✓ | ✓ | ✓ | ✗ | ✗ | 16:9 HD | Polish, English, Russian, Czech, Hungarian | ✗ |
| Viasat True Crime HD | True crime | ✓ | ✓ | ✓ | ✗ | ✗ | 16:9 HD | Polish, English, Russian, Czech, Hungarian | ✗ |
| Romance TV | Movies / Series | ✓ | ✓ | ✓ | ✗ | ✗ | 16:9 SD | Polish | ✗ |
| Romance TV HD* | Movies / Series | ✓ | ✓ | ✓ | ✗ | ✗ | 16:9 HD | Polish | ✗ |
| Motowizja | Motorization | ✗ | ✓ | ✓ | ✗ | ✗ | 16:9 SD | Polish | ✗ |
| Motowizja HD* | Motorization | ✗ | ✓ | ✓ | ✗ | ✗ | 16:9 HD | Polish | ✗ |
| SportKlub | Sport | ✗ | ✓ | ✓ | ✗ | ✗ | 16:9 SD | Polish, English | ✗ |
| SportKlub HD* | Sport | ✗ | ✓ | ✓ | ✗ | ✗ | 16:9 HD | Polish, English | ✗ |
| FightKlub | Sport | ✗ | ✓ | ✓ | ✗ | ✗ | 16:9 SD | Polish | ✗ |
| FightKlub HD* | Sport | ✗ | ✓ | ✓ | ✗ | ✗ | 16:9 HD | Polish | ✗ |
| Active Family | Lifestyle | ✗ | ✓ | ✓ | ✗ | ✗ | 16:9 SD | Polish | ✗ |
| Active Family HD | Lifestyle | ✗ | ✗ | ✓ | ✗ | ✗ | 16:9 HD | Polish | ✗ |
| Outdoor TV | Hunting / Outdoor | ✗ | ✗ | ✓ | ✗ | ✗ | 16:9 | Polish | ✗ |
| Sportowa TV | Sport | ✗ | ✗ | ✓ | ✗ | ✗ | 16:9 SD | Polish | ✗ |
| Sportowa TV HD | Sport | ✗ | ✗ | ✓ | ✗ | ✗ | 16:9 HD | Polish | ✗ |
| Bollywood HD | Movies | ✗ | ✗ | ✓ | ✗ | ✗ | 16:9 HD | English | ✗ |
| Biznes24 | News | ✗ | ✓ | ✓ | ✓ | ✓ | 16:9 SD | Polish | ✓ |
| Zero | News | ✓ | ✓ | ✓ | ✗ | ✗ | 16:9 SD | Polish | ✗ |
| TV Republika | News | ✓ | ✓ | ✓ | ✗ | ✗ | 16:9 SD | Polish | ✗ |
| TV Republika HD | News | ✗ | ✗ | ✓ | ✗ | ✗ | 16:9 HD | Polish | ✗ |
| TV Republika Plus | News | ✓ | ✓ | ✓ | ✗ | ✗ | 16:9 SD | Polish | ✗ |
| TV Republika Plus HD | News | ✗ | ✗ | ✓ | ✗ | ✗ | 16:9 HD | Polish | ✗ |
| News24 | News | ✓ | ✓ | ✓ | ✗ | ✓ | 16:9 HD | English | ✗ |
| wPolsce24 | News | ✓ | ✗ | ✓ | ✗ | ✗ | 16:9 SD | Polish | ✗ |
| wPolsce24 HD | News | ✗ | ✗ | ✓ | ✗ | ✗ | 16:9 HD | Polish | ✗ |
| wPolsce24 4K | News | ✗ | ✗ | ✓ | ✗ | ✗ | 16:9 4K | Polish | ✗ |
| Publicystyka.tv | News | ✗ | ✗ | ✓ | ✗ | ✗ | 16:9 SD | Polish | ✗ |
| Newsmax | News | ✓ | ✗ | ✓ | ✗ | ✗ | 16:9 SD | Polish | ✗ |
| Newsmax HD | News | ✗ | ✗ | ✓ | ✗ | ✗ | 16:9 HD | Polish | ✗ |
| Bloomberg | News | ✓ | ✓ | ✓ | ✗ | ✗ | 16:9 HD | English | ✓ |
| Euronews | News | ✓ | ✓ | ✓ | ✗ | ✗ | 16:9 HD | English | ✓ |
| Current Time TV | News | ✓ | ✓ | ✓ | ✗ | ✗ | 16:9 HD | Russian | ✓ |
| KBS World | News | ✗ | ✗ | ✗ | ✗ | ✗ | 16:9 HD | Korean | ✓ |
| Arirang | News | ✗ | ✗ | ✗ | ✗ | ✗ | 16:9 HD | Korean | ✓ |
| NHK World-Japan | News | ✗ | ✗ | ✗ | ✗ | ✗ | 16:9 HD | Japanese | ✓ |
| TV Trwam | Religion | ✗ | ✗ | ✓ | ✓ | ✓ | 16:9 SD | Polish | ✓ |
| TBN Polska | Religion | ✗ | ✓ | ✓ | ✗ | ✓ | 16:9 SD | Polish | ✗ |
| TBN Polska HD | Religion | ✗ | ✗ | ✓ | ✗ | ✗ | 16:9 HD | Polish | ✗ |
| EWTN Polska Currently online only | Religion | ✗ | ✗ | ✗ | ✗ | ✗ | 16:9 | Polish | ✓ |
| Daystar HD | Religion | ✗ | ✓ | ✗ | ✗ | ✗ | 16:9 | English | ✓ |
| Twoja TV | Entertainment | ✗ | ✗ | ✓ | ✗ | ✗ | 16:9 SD | Polish | ✗ |
| Twoja TV HD | Entertainment | ✗ | ✗ | ✓ | ✗ | ✗ | 16:9 HD | Polish | ✗ |
| CTV Dla Ciebie TV | Entertainment | ✗ | ✗ | ✓ | ✗ | ✓ | 16:9 SD | Polish | ✗ |
| CTV Dla Ciebie TV HD | Entertainment | ✗ | ✗ | ✓ | ✗ | ✓ | 16:9 HD | Polish | ✗ |
| Show TV 4K | Entertainment | ✗ | ✓ | ✓ | ✗ | ✓ | 16:9 4K | Polish | ✓ |
| Show TV HD* | Entertainment | ✗ | ✓ | ✓ | ✗ | ✓ | 16:9 HD | Polish | ✓ |
| ViDoc TV 4K | Movies / Documentaries | ✗ | ✓ | ✓ | ✓ | ✓ | 16:9 4K | Polish | ✗ |
| ViDoc TV HD | Movies / Documentaries | ✗ | ✓ | ✓ | ✓ | ✓ | 16:9 HD | Polish | ✗ |
| Short TV 4K | Entertainment | ✗ | ✗ | ✓ | ✗ | ✗ | 16:9 4K | Polish | ✗ |
| Short TV HD | Entertainment | ✗ | ✗ | ✓ | ✗ | ✗ | 16:9 HD | Polish | ✗ |
| Stargaze TV HD | Entertainment | ✗ | ✗ | ✓ | ✗ | ✗ | 16:9 HD | Polish | ✗ |
| TVS | Regional | ✓ | ✓ | ✓ | ✗ | ✓ | 16:9 SD | Polish | ✗ |
| TVS HD | Regional | ✗ | ✗ | ✓ | ✗ | ✗ | 16:9 HD | Polish | ✓ |
| TVS HD +1 | Regional | ✗ | ✗ | ✓ | ✗ | ✗ | 16:9 HD | Polish | ✓ |
| Stars.TV | Music | ✓ | ✓ | ✓ | ✗ | ✓ | 16:9 SD | Polish | ✓ |
| Stars.TV HD | Music | ✗ | ✗ | ✓ | ✗ | ✗ | 16:9 HD | Polish | ✗ |
| 13.tv | General | ✗ | ✗ | ✓ | ✗ | ✗ | 16:9 SD | Polish | ✗ |
| 13.tv HD | General | ✗ | ✗ | ✓ | ✗ | ✗ | 16:9 HD | Polish | ✗ |
| 13.tv 3D | General | ✗ | ✗ | ✓ | ✗ | ✗ | 16:9 3D | Polish | ✗ |
| Fashion TV | Lifestyle | ✓ | ✗ | ✓ | ✗ | ✓ | 16:9 SD | English | ✓ |
| Dolce Vita TV | Lifestyle | ✗ | ✓ | ✓ | ✗ | ✗ | 16:9 SD | English | ✗ |
| Dolce Vita HD | Lifestyle | ✗ | ✓ | ✓ | ✗ | ✗ | 16:9 HD | English | ✗ |
| Remonty TV | Lifestyle | ✓ | ✗ | ✓ | ✗ | ✗ | 16:9 SD | Polish | ✗ |
| Remonty TV HD | Lifestyle | ✓ | ✗ | ✓ | ✗ | ✗ | 16:9 HD | Polish | ✗ |
| Studiomed TV | Health and medicine | ✗ | ✓ | ✓ | ✗ | ✗ | 16:9 SD | Polish | ✗ |
| Studiomed TV HD | Health and medicine | ✗ | ✓ | ✓ | ✗ | ✗ | 16:9 HD | Polish | ✗ |
| V90 | Music | ✗ | ✗ | ✓ | ✗ | ✗ | 16:9 SD | Polish | ✗ |
| JAZZ | Music | ✗ | ✗ | ✓ | ✗ | ✗ | 16:9 SD | Polish | ✗ |
| JAZZ 4K | Music | ✗ | ✗ | ✓ | ✗ | ✗ | 16:9 4K | Polish | ✗ |
| JAZZ HD | Music | ✗ | ✗ | ✓ | ✗ | ✗ | 16:9 HD | Polish | ✗ |
| Mezzo | Music | ✗ | ✓ | ✓ | ✗ | ✗ | 16:9 SD | French | ✗ |
| Mezzo Live HD | Music | ✗ | ✗ | ✓ | ✗ | ✗ | 16:9 HD | French | ✗ |
| Stingray Classica | Music | ✗ | ✗ | ✓ | ✗ | ✗ | 16:9 SD | English | ✗ |
| Stingray Classica HD | Music | ✗ | ✗ | ✓ | ✗ | ✗ | 16:9 HD | English | ✗ |
| Stingray Djazz | Music | ✗ | ✗ | ✓ | ✗ | ✗ | 16:9 SD | English | ✗ |
| Stingray Djazz HD | Music | ✗ | ✗ | ✓ | ✗ | ✗ | 16:9 HD | English | ✗ |
| myZen.tv | Music | ✗ | ✗ | ✓ | ✗ | ✗ | 16:9 SD | English | ✗ |
| myZen 4K | Music | ✗ | ✗ | ✓ | ✗ | ✗ | 16:9 HD | English | ✗ |
| myZen.tv HD | Music | ✗ | ✗ | ✓ | ✗ | ✗ | 16:9 HD | English | ✗ |
| Da Vinci | Children | ✓ | ✓ | ✓ | ✗ | ✗ | 16:9 SD | Polish | ✗ |
| Da Vinci HD | Children | ✗ | ✗ | ✓ | ✗ | ✗ | 16:9 HD | Polish | ✗ |
| Duck TV | Children | ✗ | ✗ | ✓ | ✗ | ✗ | 16:9 SD | English | ✗ |
| Duck TV HD | Children | ✗ | ✗ | ✓ | ✗ | ✗ | 16:9 HD | English | ✗ |
| Baby First TV | Children | ✗ | ✗ | ✓ | ✗ | ✗ | 4:3 SD | English | ✗ |
| English Club TV | Education | ✗ | ✗ | ✓ | ✗ | ✗ | 16:9 SD | English | ✗ |
| English Club TV HD | Education | ✗ | ✗ | ✓ | ✗ | ✗ | 16:9 HD | English | ✗ |
| TinyTeen | Education | ✗ | ✗ | ✓ | ✗ | ✗ | 16:9 SD | English | ✗ |
| TinyTeen HD | Education | ✗ | ✗ | ✓ | ✗ | ✗ | 16:9 HD | English | ✗ |
| LingoToons | Education | ✗ | ✗ | ✓ | ✗ | ✗ | 16:9 SD | English | ✗ |
| LingoToons HD | Education | ✗ | ✗ | ✓ | ✗ | ✗ | 16:9 HD | English | ✗ |
| LangLab | Education | ✗ | ✗ | ✓ | ✗ | ✗ | 16:9 SD | English | ✗ |
| LangLab HD | Education | ✗ | ✗ | ✓ | ✗ | ✗ | 16:9 HD | English | ✗ |
| Ginx eSports TV | E-sport | ✗ | ✗ | ✓ | ✗ | ✗ | 16:9 SD | English | ✗ |
| Ginx eSports TV HD | E-sport | ✗ | ✗ | ✓ | ✗ | ✗ | 16:9 HD | English | ✗ |
| E-Sport TV | E-sport | ✗ | ✗ | ✓ | ✗ | ✗ | 16:9 SD | English | ✗ |
| E-Sport TV HD | E-sport | ✗ | ✗ | ✓ | ✗ | ✗ | 16:9 HD | English | ✗ |
| 2X2 TV | Games and animation | ✗ | ✗ | ✓ | ✗ | ✗ | 16:9 HD | Polish | ✗ |
| Blue Hustler | Pornography | ✗ | ✓ | ✓ | ✗ | ✗ | 16:9 SD | English | ✗ |
| Hustler TV | Pornography | ✗ | ✗ | ✓ | ✗ | ✗ | 16:9 SD | English | ✗ |
| Hustler HD | Pornography | ✓ | ✓ | ✓ | ✗ | ✗ | 16:9 HD | English | ✗ |
| Private TV | Pornography | ✓ | ✓ | ✓ | ✗ | ✗ | 16:9 SD | English | ✗ |
| Private TV HD* | Pornography | ✓ | ✓ | ✓ | ✗ | ✗ | 16:9 HD | English | ✗ |
| Redlight HD | Pornography | ✓ | ✓ | ✓ | ✗ | ✗ | 16:9 HD | English | ✗ |
| Dorcel TV | Pornography | ✗ | ✓ | ✓ | ✗ | ✗ | 16:9 SD | English, Polish | ✗ |
| Dorcel TV HD | Pornography | ✗ | ✓ | ✓ | ✗ | ✗ | 16:9 HD | English, Polish | ✗ |
| Dorcel XXX | Pornography | ✗ | ✗ | ✓ | ✗ | ✗ | 16:9 SD | English | ✗ |
| Dorcel XXX HD | Pornography | ✗ | ✗ | ✓ | ✗ | ✗ | 16:9 HD | English | ✗ |
| Playboy TV | Pornography | ✗ | ✓ | ✗ | ✗ | ✗ | 16:9 SD | English | ✗ |
| Playboy TV HD* | Pornography | ✗ | ✓ | ✗ | ✗ | ✗ | 16:9 HD | English | ✗ |
| Adult Channel | Pornography | ✗ | ✗ | ✓ | ✗ | ✗ | 16:9 SD | English | ✗ |
| Brazzers TV Europe | Pornography | ✓ | ✗ | ✓ | ✗ | ✗ | 16:9 SD | English | ✗ |
| Brazzers TV Europe HD* | Pornography | ✓ | ✗ | ✓ | ✗ | ✗ | 16:9 HD | English | ✗ |
| Reality Kings TV | Pornography | ✗ | ✗ | ✓ | ✗ | ✗ | 16:9 SD | English | ✗ |
| Vivid Touch | Pornography | ✓ | ✗ | ✓ | ✗ | ✗ | 16:9 SD | English | ✗ |
| Vivid Red | Pornography | ✓ | ✓ | ✓ | ✗ | ✗ | 16:9 SD | English | ✗ |
| Vivid Red HD | Pornography | ✓ | ✓ | ✓ | ✗ | ✗ | 16:9 HD | English | ✗ |
| NASA TV HD | Astronomy | ✗ | ✓ | ✗ | ✗ | ✓ | 16:9 HD | English | ✗ |
| NASA TV UHD | Astronomy | ✓ | ✓ | ✗ | ✗ | ✓ | 16:9 4K | English | ✗ |
| Museum 4K | Culture, history | ✗ | ✓ | ✗ | ✗ | ✗ | 16:9 4K | Polish, English | ✗ |
| Insight TV UHD | General | ✓ | ✗ | ✗ | ✗ | ✗ | 16:9 4K | Polish, English | ✗ |
| Love Nature 4K | Nature | ✗ | ✓ | ✗ | ✗ | ✗ | 16:9 4K | Polish, English | ✗ |
| Travelxp 4K | Travel | ✗ | ✗ | ✓ | ✗ | ✗ | 16:9 HD | English | ✗ |

* SD version of the channel available only on cable

== Regional channels ==
=== Telewizja Polska ===
| Channel | Type | Polsat Box | Canal+ | Cable | Terrestrial | FTA | Format | Audio language | Online |
|---|---|---|---|---|---|---|---|---|---|
| TVP3 Białystok | Regional | ✓ | ✓ | ✓ | ✓ | ✗ | 16:9 HD | Polish | ✓ |
| TVP3 Bydgoszcz | Regional | ✓ | ✓ | ✓ | ✓ | ✗ | 16:9 HD | Polish | ✓ |
| TVP3 Gdańsk | Regional | ✓ | ✓ | ✓ | ✓ | ✗ | 16:9 HD | Polish | ✓ |
| TVP3 Gorzów Wielkopolski | Regional | ✓ | ✓ | ✓ | ✓ | ✗ | 16:9 HD | Polish | ✓ |
| TVP3 Katowice | Regional | ✓ | ✓ | ✓ | ✓ | ✗ | 16:9 HD | Polish | ✓ |
| TVP3 Kielce | Regional | ✓ | ✓ | ✓ | ✓ | ✗ | 16:9 HD | Polish | ✓ |
| TVP3 Kraków | Regional | ✓ | ✓ | ✓ | ✓ | ✗ | 16:9 HD | Polish | ✓ |
| TVP3 Lublin | Regional | ✓ | ✓ | ✓ | ✓ | ✗ | 16:9 HD | Polish | ✓ |
| TVP3 Łódź | Regional | ✓ | ✓ | ✓ | ✓ | ✗ | 16:9 HD | Polish | ✓ |
| TVP3 Olsztyn | Regional | ✓ | ✓ | ✓ | ✓ | ✗ | 16:9 HD | Polish | ✓ |
| TVP3 Opole | Regional | ✓ | ✓ | ✓ | ✓ | ✗ | 16:9 HD | Polish | ✓ |
| TVP3 Poznań | Regional | ✓ | ✓ | ✓ | ✓ | ✗ | 16:9 HD | Polish | ✓ |
| TVP3 Rzeszów | Regional | ✓ | ✓ | ✓ | ✓ | ✗ | 16:9 HD | Polish | ✓ |
| TVP3 Szczecin | Regional | ✓ | ✓ | ✓ | ✓ | ✗ | 16:9 HD | Polish | ✓ |
| TVP3 Warszawa | Regional | ✓ | ✓ | ✓ | ✓ | ✗ | 16:9 HD | Polish | ✓ |
| TVP3 Wrocław | Regional | ✓ | ✓ | ✓ | ✓ | ✗ | 16:9 HD | Polish | ✓ |

=== Others ===
| Channel | Polsat Box | Canal+ | Cable | Terrestrial | FTA | Format | Audio language |
|---|---|---|---|---|---|---|---|
| TV Regio | ✗ | ✗ | ✓ | ✗ | ✗ | 16:9 SD | Polish |
| InfoLipno | ✗ | ✗ | ✓ | ✗ | ✗ | 16:9 SD | Polish |
| TV Ostrów | ✗ | ✗ | ✓ | ✗ | ✗ | 16:9 SD | Polish |
| Echo24 | ✗ | ✗ | ✓ | ✗ | ✗ | 16:9 SD | Polish |
| TV Kujawy | ✗ | ✗ | ✓ | ✗ | ✗ | 16:9 SD | Polish |
| TV Max | ✗ | ✗ | ✓ | ✗ | ✗ | 16:9 SD | Polish |
| TV Obiektyw | ✗ | ✗ | ✓ | ✗ | ✗ | 16:9 SD | Polish |
| TV Master | ✗ | ✗ | ✓ | ✗ | ✗ | 16:9 SD | Polish |
| TV Regionalna.pl | ✗ | ✗ | ✓ | ✗ | ✗ | 16:9 SD | Polish |
| TV Gniezno | ✗ | ✗ | ✓ | ✗ | ✗ | 16:9 SD | Polish |
| Telewizja Leszno | ✗ | ✗ | ✓ | ✗ | ✗ | 16:9 SD | Polish |
| TV Toruń | ✗ | ✗ | ✓ | ✗ | ✗ | 16:9 SD | Polish |
| TV Toruń HD | ✗ | ✗ | ✓ | ✗ | ✗ | 16:9 HD | Polish |
| Telewizja Zabrze | ✗ | ✗ | ✓ | ✗ | ✗ | 16:9 SD | Polish |
| TVK Winogrady | ✗ | ✗ | ✓ | ✗ | ✗ | 16:9 SD | Polish |
| TVK Winogrady HD | ✗ | ✗ | ✓ | ✗ | ✗ | 16:9 HD | Polish |
| TVK Winogrady UHD | ✗ | ✗ | ✓ | ✗ | ✗ | 16:9 4K | Polish |
| TV Wschód | ✗ | ✗ | ✓ | ✗ | ✗ | 16:9 SD | Polish |
| Truso.tv | ✗ | ✗ | ✓ | ✗ | ✗ | 16:9 SD | Polish |
| TV Asta | ✗ | ✗ | ✓ | ✗ | ✗ | 16:9 SD | Polish |
| TV Asta HD | ✗ | ✗ | ✓ | ✗ | ✗ | 16:9 HD | Polish |
| Telewizja STK | ✗ | ✗ | ✓ | ✗ | ✗ | 16:9 SD | Polish |
| Telewizja STK HD | ✗ | ✗ | ✓ | ✗ | ✗ | 16:9 HD | Polish |
| TV Relax | ✗ | ✗ | ✓ | ✗ | ✗ | 16:9 SD | Polish |
| Pro-art | ✗ | ✗ | ✓ | ✗ | ✗ | 16:9 SD | Polish |
| Pro-art HD | ✗ | ✗ | ✓ | ✗ | ✗ | 16:9 HD | Polish |
| TV Bielsko | ✗ | ✗ | ✓ | ✗ | ✗ | 16:9 SD | Polish |
| WTK | ✗ | ✗ | ✓ | ✗ | ✗ | 16:9 SD | Polish |
| WTK HD | ✗ | ✗ | ✓ | ✗ | ✗ | 16:9 HD | Polish |
| TV Toya | ✗ | ✗ | ✓ | ✗ | ✗ | 16:9 SD | Polish |
| TV Toya HD | ✗ | ✗ | ✓ | ✗ | ✗ | 16:9 HD | Polish |
| TV Słowianin | ✗ | ✗ | ✓ | ✗ | ✗ | 16:9 SD | Polish |
| TV Słowianin HD | ✗ | ✗ | ✓ | ✗ | ✗ | 16:9 HD | Polish |
| TV Suwałki | ✗ | ✗ | ✓ | ✗ | ✗ | 16:9 SD | Polish |
| Twoja Telewizja Morska | ✗ | ✗ | ✓ | ✗ | ✗ | 16:9 SD | Polish |
| Twoja Telewizja Religijna | ✗ | ✗ | ✓ | ✗ | ✗ | 16:9 SD | Polish |
| Lubelska TV | ✗ | ✗ | ✓ | ✗ | ✗ | 16:9 SD | Polish |
| Lubelska TV HD | ✗ | ✗ | ✓ | ✗ | ✗ | 16:9 HD | Polish |
| TV Dami | ✗ | ✗ | ✓ | ✗ | ✗ | 16:9 SD | Polish |
| TV Starachowice | ✗ | ✗ | ✓ | ✗ | ✗ | 16:9 SD | Polish |
| Katolicka Telewizja Serbinów | ✗ | ✗ | ✓ | ✗ | ✗ | 16:9 SD | Polish |
| Telewizja Lokalna | ✗ | ✗ | ✓ | ✗ | ✗ | 16:9 SD | Polish |
| Zachodniopomorska TV | ✗ | ✗ | ✓ | ✗ | ✗ | 16:9 SD | Polish |
| TV Wielkopolska | ✗ | ✗ | ✓ | ✗ | ✗ | 16:9 SD | Polish |
| TV Wielkopolska HD | ✗ | ✗ | ✓ | ✗ | ✗ | 16:9 HD | Polish |
| dlaCiebie.tv | ✗ | ✗ | ✓ | ✗ | ✗ | 16:9 SD | Polish |
| TV Regionalna | ✗ | ✗ | ✓ | ✗ | ✗ | 16:9 SD | Polish |
| Teletop Gorzów | ✗ | ✗ | ✓ | ✗ | ✗ | 16:9 SD | Polish |
| TV SM Grudziądz | ✗ | ✗ | ✓ | ✗ | ✗ | 16:9 SD | Polish |
| TV Słupsk | ✗ | ✗ | ✓ | ✗ | ✗ | 16:9 SD | Polish |
| TV Kaszuby | ✗ | ✗ | ✓ | ✗ | ✗ | 16:9 SD | Polish |
| TV Olsztyn | ✗ | ✗ | ✓ | ✗ | ✗ | 16:9 SD | Polish |
| PomeraniaTV | ✗ | ✗ | ✓ | ✗ | ✗ | 16:9 SD | Polish |
| Telewizja Kłodzka | ✗ | ✗ | ✓ | ✗ | ✗ | 16:9 SD | Polish |
| RTK | ✗ | ✗ | ✓ | ✗ | ✗ | 16:9 SD | Polish |
| ONTV | ✗ | ✗ | ✓ | ✗ | ✗ | 16:9 SD | Polish |
| ONTV HD | ✗ | ✗ | ✓ | ✗ | ✗ | 16:9 HD | Polish |
| TVT | ✗ | ✗ | ✓ | ✗ | ✗ | 16:9 SD | Polish |
| Telewizja Świętokrzyska | ✗ | ✗ | ✓ | ✗ | ✗ | 16:9 SD | Polish |
| TVT Zgorzelec | ✗ | ✗ | ✓ | ✗ | ✗ | 16:9 SD | Polish |
| TVK Podgórze | ✗ | ✗ | ✓ | ✗ | ✗ | 16:9 SD | Polish |
| TV Ropczyce.EU | ✗ | ✗ | ✓ | ✗ | ✗ | 16:9 SD | Polish |
| TeTka Tczew | ✗ | ✗ | ✓ | ✗ | ✗ | 16:9 SD | Polish |
| Telewizja Bogatynia | ✗ | ✗ | ✓ | ✗ | ✗ | 16:9 SD | Polish |
| TVPM | ✗ | ✗ | ✓ | ✗ | ✗ | 16:9 SD | Polish |

== FAST channels ==
=== Telewizja Polska ===
| Channel | TVP VOD | Polsat Box Go | Player | WP Pilot | Rakuten TV | Audio language |
|---|---|---|---|---|---|---|
| TVP Na dobre i na złe | ✓ | ✗ | ✗ | ✗ | ✗ | Polish |
| TVP Barwy szczęścia | ✓ | ✗ | ✗ | ✗ | ✗ | Polish |
| TVP Klan | ✓ | ✗ | ✗ | ✗ | ✗ | Polish |
| TVP Kryminały | ✓ | ✗ | ✗ | ✗ | ✗ | Polish |
| TVP Miłość | ✓ | ✗ | ✗ | ✗ | ✗ | Polish |
| TVP Muzyka I Koncerty | ✓ | ✗ | ✗ | ✗ | ✗ | Polish |
| TVP to the 14 channels | ✓ | ✗ | ✗ | ✗ | ✗ | Polish |

=== Polsat Plus Group ===
| Channel | TVP VOD | Polsat Box Go | Player | WP Pilot | Rakuten TV | Audio language |
|---|---|---|---|---|---|---|
| Miodowe lata | ✗ | ✓ | ✗ | ✗ | ✗ | Polish |
| Chłopaki do wzięcia | ✗ | ✓ | ✗ | ✗ | ✗ | Polish |
| Daleko od noszy | ✗ | ✓ | ✗ | ✗ | ✗ | Polish |
| Dlaczego ja? | ✗ | ✓ | ✗ | ✗ | ✗ | Polish |
| Ewa gotuje | ✗ | ✓ | ✗ | ✗ | ✗ | Polish |
| Gliniarze | ✗ | ✓ | ✗ | ✗ | ✗ | Polish |
| Kabarety | ✗ | ✓ | ✗ | ✗ | ✗ | Polish |
| Komedie | ✗ | ✓ | ✗ | ✗ | ✗ | Polish |
| Nasz nowy dom | ✗ | ✓ | ✗ | ✗ | ✗ | Polish |
| Pamiętniki z wakacji | ✗ | ✓ | ✗ | ✗ | ✗ | Polish |
| Policjantki i policjanci | ✗ | ✓ | ✗ | ✗ | ✗ | Polish |
| Sprawiedliwi - Wydział Kryminalny | ✗ | ✓ | ✗ | ✗ | ✗ | Polish |
| Świat według Kiepskich | ✗ | ✓ | ✗ | ✗ | ✗ | Polish |
| Trudne sprawy | ✗ | ✓ | ✗ | ✗ | ✗ | Polish |
| Wielka rozrywka | ✗ | ✓ | ✗ | ✗ | ✗ | Polish |
| Wielkie festiwale | ✗ | ✓ | ✗ | ✗ | ✗ | Polish |
| Włatcy Móch | ✗ | ✓ | ✗ | ✗ | ✗ | Polish |
| Zbrodnie | ✗ | ✓ | ✗ | ✗ | ✗ | Polish |
| Życiowe historie | ✗ | ✓ | ✗ | ✗ | ✗ | Polish |
| Ślad | ✗ | ✓ | ✗ | ✗ | ✗ | Polish |

=== TVN Warner Bros. Discovery ===
| Channel | TVP VOD | Polsat Box Go | Player | WP Pilot | Rakuten TV | Audio language |
|---|---|---|---|---|---|---|
| TVN Rewolucje w Kuchni | ✗ | ✗ | ✓ | ✗ | ✗ | Polish |
| TVN Millionerzy | ✗ | ✗ | ✓ | ✗ | ✗ | Polish |
| TVN Kultowe Seriale | ✗ | ✗ | ✓ | ✗ | ✗ | Polish |
| TVN Rajska Miłość | ✗ | ✗ | ✓ | ✗ | ✗ | Polish |
| TVN Kryminalnie | ✗ | ✗ | ✓ | ✗ | ✗ | Polish |
| TVN Momenty Prawdy | ✗ | ✗ | ✓ | ✗ | ✗ | Polish |
| TVN Życie Jak w Bajce | ✗ | ✗ | ✓ | ✗ | ✗ | Polish |
| TVN Telenowele | ✗ | ✗ | ✓ | ✗ | ✗ | Polish |
| TVN Szpitalne Historie | ✗ | ✗ | ✓ | ✗ | ✗ | Polish |
| TVN Talk Show | ✗ | ✗ | ✓ | ✗ | ✗ | Polish |
| TVN Szkoła Życia | ✗ | ✗ | ✓ | ✗ | ✗ | Polish |
| TVN Seriale o Kobietach | ✗ | ✗ | ✓ | ✗ | ✗ | Polish |
| TVN W Domu | ✗ | ✗ | ✓ | ✗ | ✗ | Polish |
| TVN Moto | ✗ | ✗ | ✓ | ✗ | ✗ | Polish |
| TVN Usterka | ✗ | ✗ | ✓ | ✗ | ✗ | Polish |
| TVN Prawo i Życie | ✗ | ✗ | ✓ | ✗ | ✗ | Polish |
| TVN Pora na Show | ✗ | ✗ | ✓ | ✗ | ✗ | Polish |
| TVN Czas na Ślub | ✗ | ✗ | ✓ | ✗ | ✗ | Polish |
| TVN Kulinarne Podróże | ✗ | ✗ | ✓ | ✗ | ✗ | Polish |
| TVN Patrol | ✗ | ✗ | ✓ | ✗ | ✗ | Polish |
| TVN BrzydUla | ✗ | ✗ | ✓ | ✗ | ✗ | Polish |
| TVN Puls Życia | ✗ | ✗ | ✓ | ✗ | ✗ | Polish |

=== ZPR Media Group ===
| Channel | TVP VOD | Polsat Box Go | Player | WP Pilot | Rakuten TV | Audio language | Online |
|---|---|---|---|---|---|---|---|
| Super Express TV | ✗ | ✗ | ✗ | ✗ | ✗ | Polish | ✓ |

=== Others ===
| Channel | TVP VOD | Polsat Box Go | Player | WP Pilot | Rakuten TV | Audio language | Online |
|---|---|---|---|---|---|---|---|
| Top Movies Polska | ✗ | ✗ | ✗ | ✗ | ✓ | Polish | |
| Moconomy | ✗ | ✗ | ✗ | ✗ | ✓ | Polish | |
| Bigtime | ✗ | ✗ | ✗ | ✗ | ✓ | Polish | |
| Grjngo | ✗ | ✗ | ✗ | ✗ | ✓ | Polish | |
| Karuzela Śmiechu | ✗ | ✗ | ✗ | ✓ | ✗ | Polish | |
| Glina TV | ✗ | ✗ | ✗ | ✓ | ✗ | Polish | |
| Didaskalia TV | ✗ | ✗ | ✗ | ✓ | ✗ | Polish | |
| Pilot Lifestyle | ✗ | ✗ | ✗ | ✓ | ✗ | Polish | |
| Da Vinci Odkrywaj Świat | ✗ | ✗ | ✗ | ✗ | ✗ | Polish | ✓ |
| Da Vinci Operacja Auć! | ✗ | ✗ | ✗ | ✗ | ✗ | Polish | ✓ |
| Da Vinci Zabawna Nauka | ✗ | ✗ | ✗ | ✗ | ✗ | Polish | ✓ |
| Kapitan Bomba TV | ✗ | ✗ | ✗ | ✗ | ✗ | Polish | ✓ |
| Porucznik Kabura TV | ✗ | ✗ | ✗ | ✗ | ✗ | Polish | ✓ |
| Nature Time | ✗ | ✗ | ✗ | ✗ | ✗ | Polish | ✓ |
| Red Carpet International TV | ✗ | ✗ | ✗ | ✗ | ✓ | Polish | |
| Car City Adventures | ✗ | ✗ | ✗ | ✗ | ✓ | Polish | |
| Viasat Explore Classic | ✗ | ✗ | ✗ | ✗ | ✓ | Polish | |
| Royalworld | ✗ | ✗ | ✗ | ✗ | ✓ | Polish | |

== Polonia channels ==
=== Telewizja Polska ===
| Channel | Type | Polsat Box | Canal+ | Cable | Terrestrial | FTA | Format | Audio language | Online |
|---|---|---|---|---|---|---|---|---|---|
| TVP Polonia | General | ✓ | ✓ | ✓ | ✓ | ✓ | 16:9 HD | Polish | ✓ |
| TVP World | News | ✓ | ✓ | ✓ | ✓ | ✓ | 16:9 HD | Polish | ✓ |

=== Polsat Plus Group ===
| Channel | Type | Polsat Box | Canal+ | Cable | Terrestrial | FTA | Format | Audio language | Online |
|---|---|---|---|---|---|---|---|---|---|
| Polsat 1 | General | ✗ | ✗ | ✗ | ✗ | ✗ | 16:9 HD | Polish | ✓ |

=== TVN Warner Bros. Discovery ===
| Channel | Type | Polsat Box | Canal+ | Cable | Terrestrial | FTA | Format | Audio language | Online |
|---|---|---|---|---|---|---|---|---|---|
| iTVN | General | ✗ | ✗ | ✗ | ✗ | ✗ | 16:9 HD | Polish, original | ✓ |
| iTVN Extra | General | ✗ | ✗ | ✗ | ✗ | ✗ | 16:9 HD | Polish, original | ✓ |

=== Others ===
| Channel | Type | Polsat Box | Canal+ | Cable | Terrestrial | FTA | Format | Audio language | Online |
|---|---|---|---|---|---|---|---|---|---|
| Polvision | General | ✗ | ✗ | ✗ | ✗ | ✗ | 16:9 HD | Polish | ✗ |

== See also ==
- Television in Poland
- Lists of television channels
- List of European television stations
