= Top Canal =

Polish television channel

- Country: Poland
- Broadcast area: Poland
- Headquarters: Warsaw

Programming
- Language: Polish

History
- Launched: 4 September 1992; 33 years ago
- Closed: 21 September 1994; 31 years ago

Top Canal was a Polish private television station operating in 1992–1994.

== History ==
In some sources Top Canal is considered to be the first private Polish television station, however, in fact, earlier stations were launched, among others: Studio Ursynat in Warsaw's Ursynów district (March 1988), Sky Orunia in Gdańsk (1989), PTV Echo in Wrocław (February 1990).

The Top Canal began operating on September 4, 1992. The owner of the station was Jacek Żelezik, the program director Tadeusz Kraśko, and the spokesman Zdzisław Mac. The program was broadcast from the roof of the Riviera Dormitory in Warsaw. The station was available only in Warsaw and its surroundings. On September 5, 1992, Top Canal was the first Polish television station to broadcast the film The Deer Hunter. Films broadcast on the station were played directly from rented VHS tapes. In addition to films, the station also broadcast Legia Warsaw matches and programs dedicated to disco polo music (including the program Disco Show). The program Disco Show presented music videos of disco polo artists in the form of a hit list. The host of the program was Tomasz Samborski. The station's music director was Robert Leszczyński. The Top Canal also broadcast the news program Jak nas widzą, in which foreign journalists expressed their opinions about Poland, and the morning and afternoon program Gość Radia Zet. The host of the program Jak nas widzą was Justyna Pochanke.

The Top Canal programmes were also broadcast from video recorders on televisions installed in articulated Ikarus buses of line 505 of the Public Transport Authority in Warsaw. In 1993, Top Canal, together with Radio Zet, organized the first radio-television debate of politicians with the participation of viewers.

The channel was boycotted by legal distributors due to broadcasting pirated content without a license. Top Canal's activities were also criticized by Telewizja Polska. On April 2, 1993, the prosecutor classified Top Canal (alongside Radio Zet, Radio S, Radio Wawa and Nowa Telewizja Warszawa) as a station openly violating the Act of December 29, 1992 on radio and television broadcasting, distributing radio or television programs without a license.

The Top Canal Media, run by Jacek Żelezik and Per Tornberg, unsuccessfully applied for a license to broadcast a nationwide program. In 1994, the station took part in the first competition for a nationwide television channel. Before the competition, the station's head sent an open letter to the National Broadcasting Council with a proposal to grant licenses to all people taking part in the competition.

== Closing ==
The Top Canal ceased broadcasting on September 21, 1994, as a result of the shutdown and confiscation of transmitting equipment by the National Radiocommunications Agency, carried out at the request of the prosecutor's office with the support of the police and the anti-terrorist brigade. A few days after the station was closed, Żelezik demanded that the National Broadcasting Council provide an answer regarding the method of allocating frequencies and granting rights to broadcast television programs in Poland. In November 1994, the National Broadcasting Council received information about attempts to resume broadcasting of the station.

In a survey conducted by Centre for Public Opinion Research in September 1994, 12% of respondents admitted that they watched Top Canal. According to the same survey, Top Canal was the second (after Polonia 1 offering a dozen or so programs) pirate TV station in terms of popularity among people watching this type of programs.
