= Canal+ Sport 2 =

Canal+ Sport 2 may refer to:

- Canal+ Sport 2 (Polish TV channel)
- Canal+ Sport 2 (Scandinavian TV channel), now C More Tennis
