= Tele 5 (disambiguation) =

Tele 5 may refer to:

- Tele 5, a German television channel
- Telecinco, a Spanish television channel
- Tele 5 (Poland), a Polish television channel
