= Sky Orunia =

Polish television channel

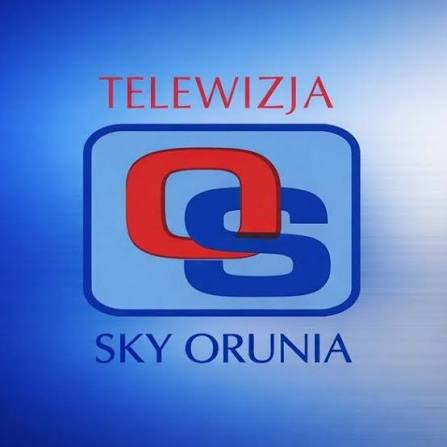
- Country: Poland
- Broadcast area: Poland
- Headquarters: ul. Nowiny 61 80-020 Gdańsk-Orunia

Programming
- Language: Polish

History
- Launched: 1989
- Closed: mid-1996

Sky Orunia was a local television operating in the years 1989–1996, broadcasting its program in the Tricity.

== History ==
It was one of the first independent private television stations in Poland. Very low-power broadcasting began in 1989 on the initiative of Zbigniew Klewiado, owner of a TV repair shop. The headquarters was located in one of the most neglected districts of Gdańsk–Orunia, hence the name of the station. In 1990, the transmitter power was improved, which covered the entire district and part of Śródmieście. The program was broadcast in violation of copyright, without the required license, but with the consent of the mayor of Gdańsk Franciszek Jamroż. It broadcast reports from the life of the district, cartoons for children, church masses were broadcast, and in the evenings, movie hits were shown from a friendly rental shop VHS. In 1994, the television received a license National Broadcasting Council to broadcast in the entire Tricity, beating, among others, the Gdynia station Polonia 1 as the Tele-Top.

The Sky Orunia appeared on UHF channel 22 on December 6, 1994, broadcasting there for over a year – until December 14, 1995, when the manager of the Gdańsk skyscraper Prorem cut off the station's electricity supply due to the station's debt.

== Closing and death ==
After several months of renewed broadcasting only via cable television, the station ceased operations in mid-1996.

The owner of the station Zbigniew Klewiado died on February 6, 2017 after a long and difficult battle with cancer at the age of 68.
