= Antena HD =

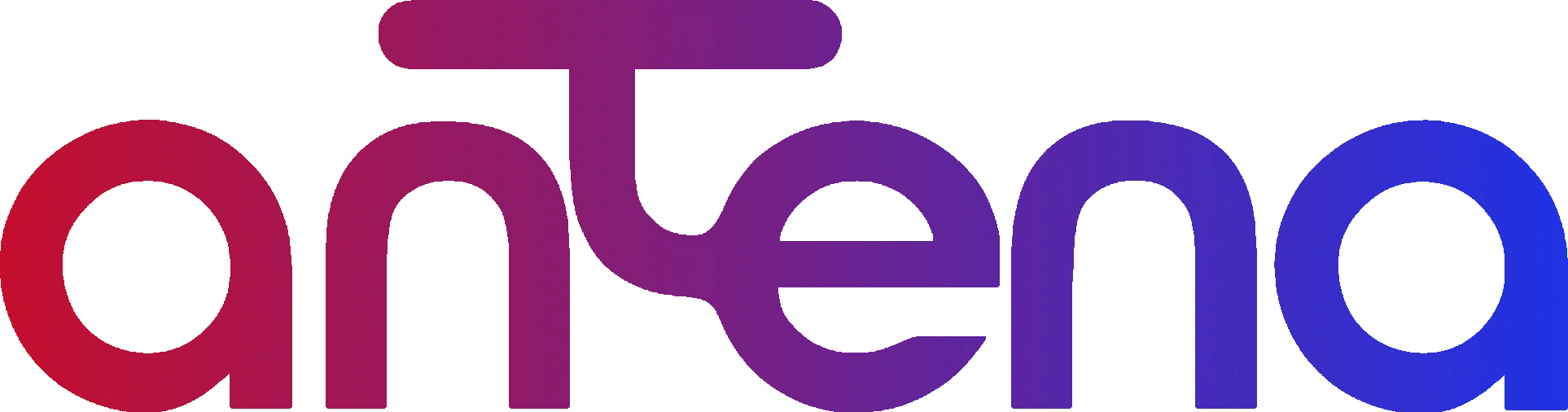
- Country: Poland
- Broadcast area: Nationwide
- Headquarters: Traugutta 147, Szczecin, Poland

Programming
- Language: Polish
- Picture format: 1080i 16:9 HDTV (downscaled to 576i for the SD feed)

Ownership
- Owner: MWE Networks

History
- Launched: 23 April 2021; 5 years ago
- Replaced: Power TV channel

Availability

Terrestrial
- Polish Digital: MUX 1 (HD)

Antena HD is a Polish free-to-air television channel owned by MWE Networks, aimed primarily at people over 50 years of age, Primarily National Coverage. (since 2022, the station has also been broadcasting productions aimed at younger viewers, such as series purchased from the ATM Rozrywka archive).

== History ==
The station won the competition announced by the National Broadcasting Council for a place in the first multiplex of digital terrestrial television after the ATM Rozrywka channel. The channel was initially supposed to be called Silver TV, but a few months earlier Beata Borucka launched an internet television of the same name – the branding of Michał Winnicki's station was therefore changed.

On April 23, 2021, a test broadcast on digital terrestrial television began. The station appeared under the temporary name Silver TV and broadcast the signal of the Power TV channel (also owned by MWE Networks) in HD quality. The official launch of the channel (with the Antena HD logo, regardless of the broadcast standard) took place on May 1, 2021, at 6:00 AM with the broadcast of Jutrznia. The National Broadcasting Council granted a broadcasting license under the original name of the channel, which is why digital terrestrial television receivers identified it as SILVER TV; this name also appeared on the screen next to the age designation. On December 10, 2021, the National Broadcasting Council issued a decision in which it allowed the official name of the station to be changed to Antena HD; in mid-December, the additional on-screen designation (SILVER TV) disappeared.

== Programming ==
The channel is aimed mainly at people over 50 years of age. The first schedule of the station included, among others, the series: The Bold and the Beautiful, Bonanza, Mothers, Wives and Lovers and Tata, a Marcin Mówi, transmissions of religious services, music shows, the entertainment show Kabaretowy szał and hidden camera programs. In June 2021, the Polish comedy series Święta wojna began airing, and in September the sitcom Pomoc domowa[18]. At the end of May 2022, both productions were taken off the air, and the channel's schedule included the series Kozetka and Zameldowani, purchased by the company of the station's owner, Michał Winnicki, which were originally produced for the ATM Rozrywka channel, which was liquidated in 2021[19]. From May 2023 to June 2024, the station broadcast the series Columb

== Logo ==
From May to December 2021, Hanna Baka was the channel's program director. In July 2022, Karol Warda took her place.

The sale of airtime to advertisers and the promotion of the station were entrusted to the Advertising Office of Telewizja Polska.
