= Telewizja Toruń =

Polish TV station

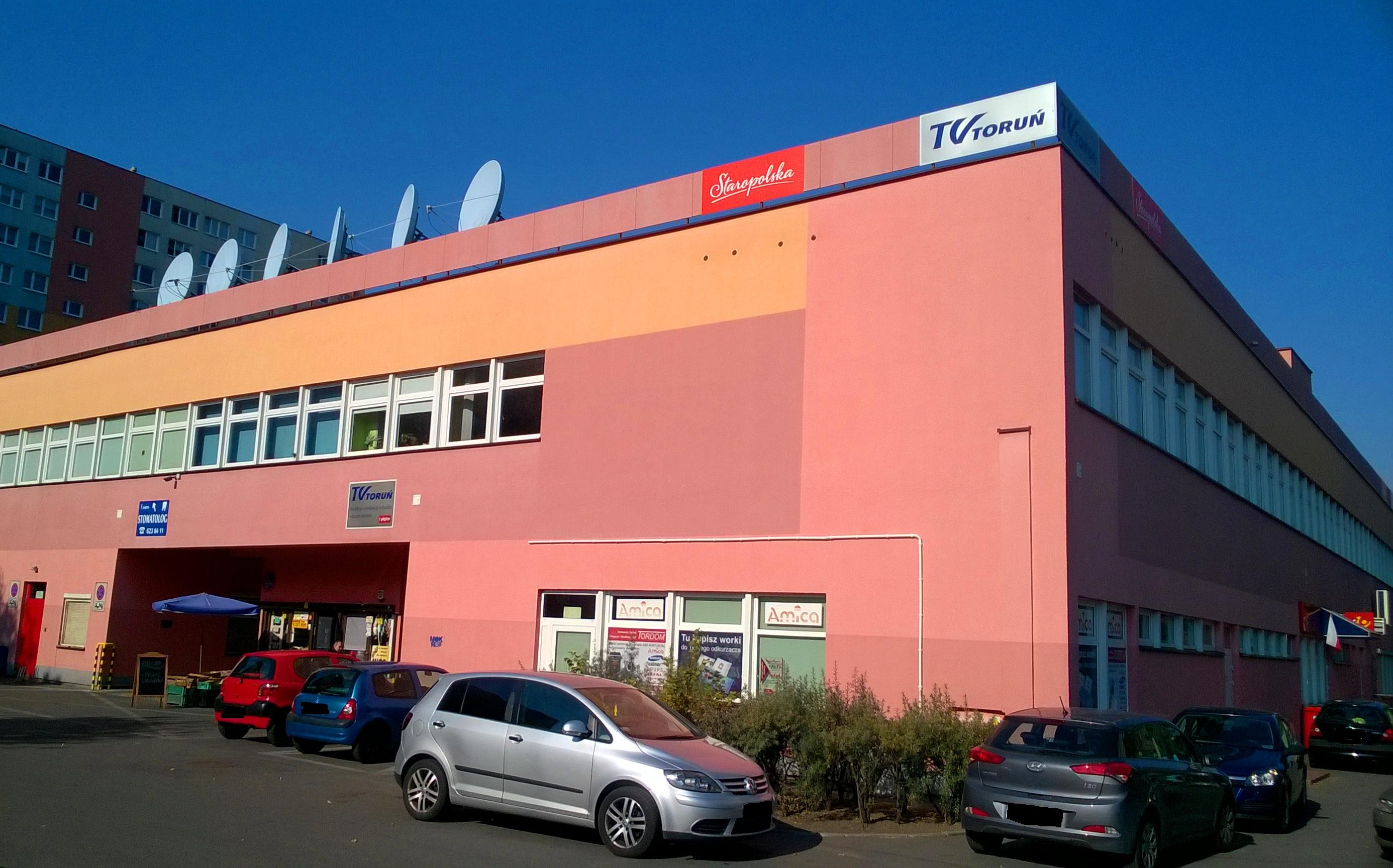
Telewizja Toruń headquarters in 2018

Telewizja Toruń (cable TV of Toruń) is a local Polish TV station that was founded in 1992, operating in the city of Toruń and the Kuyavian–Pomeranian Voivodeship. The TV Toruń is also an internet and telephone provider for the city of Toruń.

== History ==
The first broadcast of the network was aired on November 11, 1992. In 2008, Telewizja Toruń launched its website.
