= Polcast Television =

Polish television group

- Type: TV Broadcaster
- Founded: 2006
- Headquarters: Warsaw, Poland; Milan, Italy
- Key people: Vittorio Hemsi Cohen, Chairman
- Products: Polonia 1, Tele 5, Water Planet, and Novela TV
- Website: www.polcast.tv

Polcast Television Media Group is a Polish television company founded in 1999 which broadcasts several channels including Top Shop. It took over management of Tele 5 and Polonia 1 Podcast Television after the bankruptcy of previous producer Fincast. On 14th May 2012 Polcast launched two new thematic stations Water Planet and Novela TV and on 28 May 2018 launched Red Carpet TV. Polcast

== Television channels ==
- Active channels:
  - Polonia 1 (1993-present)
  - Tele 5 (2002-present)
  - Novela TV (2012-present)
  - Water Planet (2012-present)
  - Red Carpet TV (2018-present)
- Defunct channels:
  - Top Shop (1997-2018)
  - Super 1 (1998-2002)
  - CSB TV (2010-2012)
