= Kabaret TV =

- Country: Poland

Programming
- Language(s): Polish
- Picture format: 16:9/4:3 576i (SDTV); 1080i (HDTV)

Ownership
- Owner: Wirtualna Polska Holding

History
- Launched: April 1, 2024

Links
- Website: https://kabarettv.pl/

Kabaret TV is a Polish entertainment channel about cabarets, launched on 1 April 2024. The channel is owned by Wirtualna Polska Holding, owner of one of the largest Polish web portals, Wirtualna Polska.

== Programming ==
=== Own production ===
- Mistrzowie kabaretu
- 1,2,3 Kabaret
- Kabaret na żądanie
- Kabaretowy śmiech grupowy
