= Canal+ Domo =

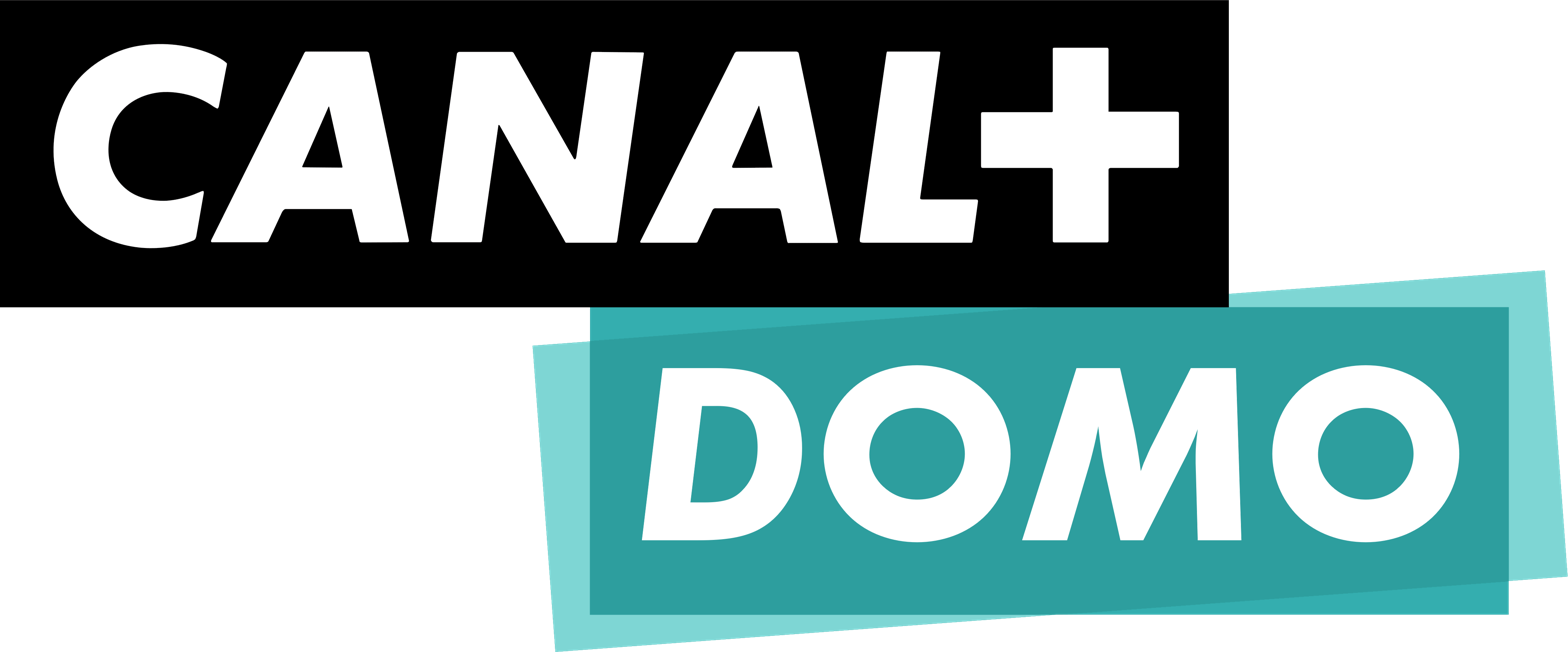
- Country: Poland
- Broadcast area: Nationwide

Programming
- Picture format: 16:9 576i (SDTV); 1080i (HDTV)

Ownership
- Owner: Canal+ International (Canal+)
- Parent: Canal+ Polska SA
- Sister channels: Canal+ Kuchnia

History
- Launched: 20 September 2008
- Former names: Domo (2008-2011); Domo+ (2011-2021)

Links
- Website: www.canalplus.com/pl/canalplusdomo

Canal+ Domo is a Polish television channel owned and operated by Canal+ International.

On 1 December 2020, a Czech-language version was launched on Skylink, named Canal+ Domo. It have the same programming but it is commercial-free. The Polish Domo+ became Canal+ Domo on 15 April 2021.

== Logos ==
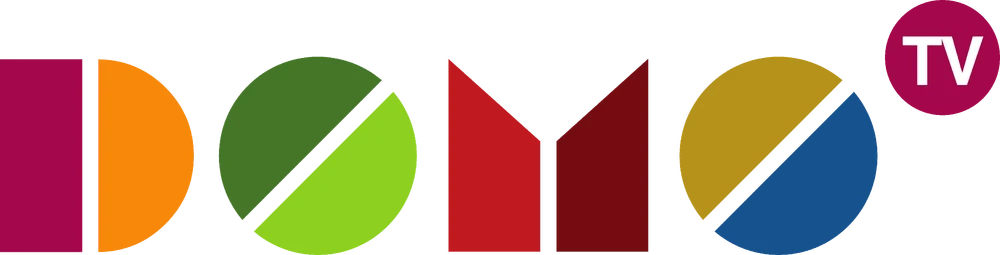
2008-2011

2011-2014

2014-2021

== See also ==
- Canal+ Kuchnia
