= Canal+ Now (Poland) =

- Country: Poland
- Broadcast area: Poland
- Network: Canal+ Poland
- Headquarters: Warsaw, Poland

Programming
- Language: Polish
- Picture format: 1080i (HDTV); 4K (UHDTV)

Ownership
- Owner: Canal+ International (Canal+)
- Parent: Canal+ Polska SA
- Sister channels: Canal+ Sport; Canal+ Sport 2 Canal+ Sport 3 Canal+ Sport 4 Canal+ Sport 5 Canal+ Extra 1 Canal+ Extra 2 Canal+ Extra 3 Canal+ Extra 4 Canal+ Extra 5 Canal+ Extra 6 Canal+ Extra 7

History
- Launched: 15 August 2017; 9 years ago
- Replaced: Sport 38

Links
- Website: www.canalplus.pl

Channel logo during transmission in 4K

Canal+ Now is a Polish-language television station broadcast by Canal+ Polska SA and is one of nine channels available in Poland under the French Canal+ network. The channel was launched on 15 August 2017.

The channel was created from the so-called Sport 38 channel, which broadcast occasionally sporting events, which due to lack of space in the main channels of broadcasters could not be broadcast live on them. Canal+ Now will remain an occasional channel, making it a station similar to Canal+ Weekend.

From 21 November 2017, the channel offer has been enriched with 4K transmissions.

== Programming ==
Canal+ Now primarily shows special events that are also being broadcast at the same time on Canal+ Poland, Canal+ Sport and Canal+ Sport 2. They will include the UEFA Champions League (play-offs and group stages), Europa League, Ekstraklasa, Cavaliada Tour, EHF Champions League and the PGA European Tour.
