= Zoom TV (Poland) =

Polish TV channel

Zoom
- Country: Poland

Programming
- Language: Polish
- Picture format: 576i (16:9 SDTV); 1080i HDTV)

Ownership
- Owner: Kino Polska TV S.A.

History
- Launched: 25 October 2016; 9 years ago

Links
- Website: www.zoomtv.pl

Availability

Terrestrial
- Polish Digital: MUX 8 - Channel 39 (SD)

Zoom is a Polish television channel, launched on October 25, 2016.

== Programming ==
On the programming schedule consists of programs prepared by the local cable televisions, associated in the Polish Chamber of Electronic Communication (PIKE), magazines created for the web portal Onet.pl, and also movies, TV series and documentaries. The channel was available as a free-to-air terrestrial television network until it left Polish DTT on December 29, 2025. In September 2025 Zoom TV received a Spanish license from Comisión Nacional de los Mercados y la Competencia,Kanał który zniknie z multipleksu ma dodatkową koncesję, Poza Polską On March 11, 2026, Polish National Broadcasting Council (KRRiT) revoked polish license for Zoom TV, On May 1, 2026, Zoom TV fully switched to Spanish license and changed its name to Zoom.

=== Series ===
- Weeds (Trawka)
- Those Who Kill (Zabójcy)
- Ezel
- Pippi Longstocking (Pippi Langstrumpf)

=== Magazines ===
- Bliżej! Magazyn reporterów (More closely! Reporters magazine) - hosted by Elżbieta Grzeszczuk-Chętko (TV Toya) and Dariusz Milejczak (WTK)
- Obywatel Kuźniar (Citizen Kuźniar) - talk-show, hosted by Jarosław Kuźniar (Onet.pl)
- Subiektywny (Subjective) - current affairs program, hosted by Bartosz Węglarczyk (Onet.pl)
- Na czasie (Trendy) - program about business and high-tech, hosted by Łukasz Grass (Onet.pl)

=== Documentary series/reality shows ===
- Hoarders (Mania chomikowania)
- My Crazy Ex (Kocha, lubi, prześladuje)
- Best in Bridal (Bitwa na suknie ślubne)

=== Entertainment ===
- Miło/ść (Lo/ve) - talk-show about marriages, hosted by Piotr Najsztub
- Świat według Jachimka (The World According to Jachimek) - satirical program, hosted by Tomasz Jachimek (Onet.pl)
