= Water Planet =

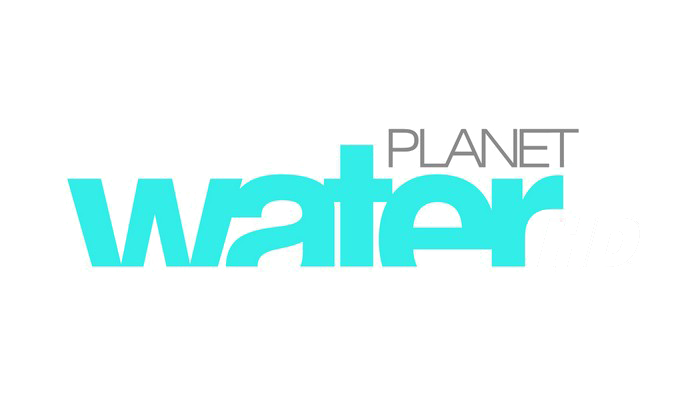
- Broadcast area: Poland

Programming
- Language: Polish
- Picture format: 16:9 576i (SDTV); 1080i (HDTV)

Ownership
- Owner: Polcast Television
- Sister channels: Tele 5 Polonia 1 Novela TV

History
- Launched: 14 May 2012

Water Planet is a Polish television channel owned by Polcast Television, which broadcasts programmes about sea and tourism. It was launched on May 14, 2012 and replaced CSB TV.
