= Canal+ Sport 5 =

Polish television sports channel

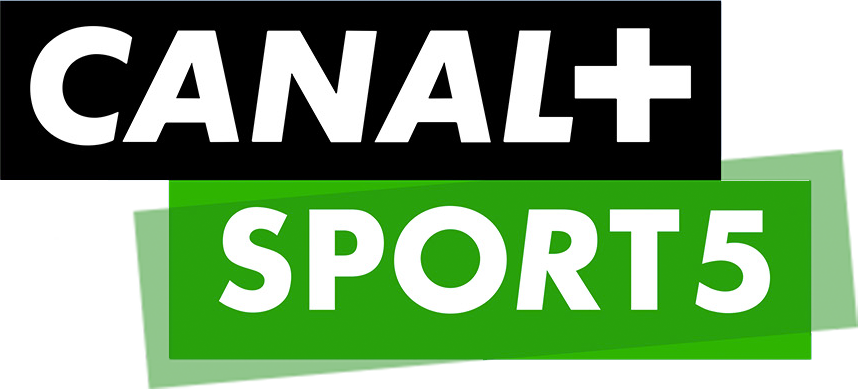
- Country: Poland
- Broadcast area: Poland
- Network: Canal+ Poland
- Headquarters: Warsaw, Poland

Ownership
- Owner: Canal+ International (Canal+)
- Parent: Canal+ Polska SA
- Sister channels: Canal+ Sport; Canal+ Sport 2 Canal+ Sport 3 Canal+ Sport 4 Canal+ Extra 1 Canal+ Extra 2 Canal+ Extra 3 Canal+ Extra 4 Canal+ Extra 5 Canal+ Extra 6 Canal+ Extra 7 Canal+ Now

History
- Launched: 12 October 2006; 20 years ago

Links
- Website: www.canalplus.com/pl/sport/

Canal+ Sport 5 former nSport+ is a Polish sports channel owned by Canal+ International launched on 12 October 2006. The channel is available only for platform Platforma Canal+.

On 4 April 2022 at 2:20 a.m., the channel changed its name to Canal Sport 5.

== Sports rights ==
- Football
  - Ekstraklasa
  - ~~Russian Cup~~
- Handball
  - EHF Champions League
  - Women's EHF Champions League
- Speedway
  - PGE Ekstraliga (first division)
  - Metalkas 2. Ekstraliga (second division)
  - Krajowa Liga Żużlowa (third division)

== Logo ==
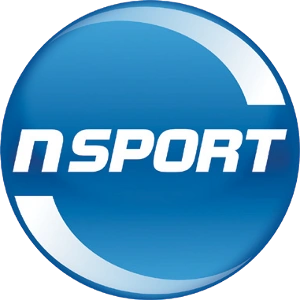
Former Logo used from 12 October 2006 to 31 August 2014

Former Logo used from 1 September 2014 to 3 April 2022
