= Novela TV =

Polish television channel

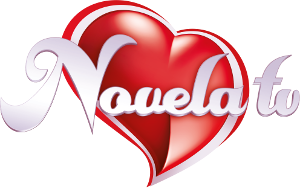
- Broadcast area: Poland
- Headquarters: Media Martet, Warsaw, Poland

Programming
- Language: Polish
- Picture format: 576i (16:9 SDTV); 1080i HDTV)

Ownership
- Owner: Polcast Television
- Sister channels: Tele 5 Polonia 1 Water Planet

History
- Launched: 14 May 2012

Availability

Terrestrial
- Terrestrial Poland: Channel 100

Novela TV is a Polish television channel owned by Polcast Television, which broadcasts telenovelas. It was launched on May 14, 2012.
