= Studio Ursynat =

Polish television channel

- Country: Poland
- Broadcast area: Poland
- Headquarters: Warsaw

Programming
- Language: Polish

Ownership
- Owner: Porion

History
- Launched: 5 March 1988; 38 years ago
- Closed: 1997

Studio Ursynat, also Ursynat was a first Polish private television station and the first cable television network established in 1988 in Warsaw's Ursynów district.

== History ==
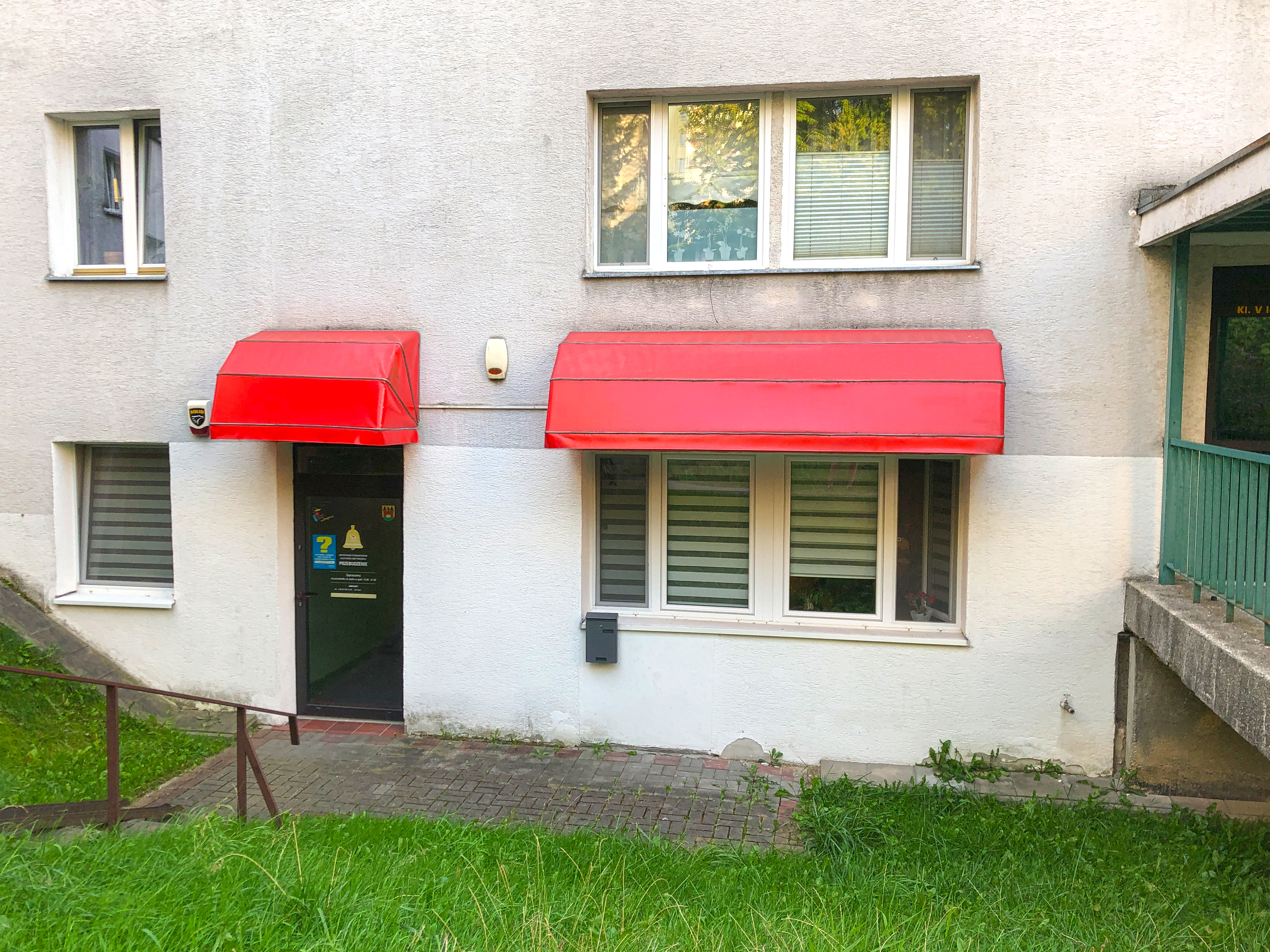
Service premises at ul. Meander 15, where the Ursynat television studio was located for the longest time

The local television Studio Ursynat was established on the initiative of the Ursynów-Natolińskie Towarzystwo Społeczno-Kulturalne at the turn of 1987 and 1988. The journalists involved in its creation were Andrzej „Ibis” Wróblewski from „Życie Warszawy” and Jerzy Machaj and Marek Przybylik, associated with the local magazine „Pasmo”. The name of the studio comes from the name of the entity organizing the station. The first broadcast of the program took place on March 5, 1988, and took place via a cable network connecting the station's headquarters, located in a block of flats on the Imielin housing estate at ul. Marco Polo 15, and three neighboring buildings. The first host was Edyta Wojtczak. The program included daily news programs broadcast at 5:00 p.m., as well as local, cultural, cinematographic reports and programs for children. Most of the content was broadcast in the afternoon. The first broadcasts were accompanied by frequent failures and technical problems. The graphics were implemented using Amiga computers. The equipment necessary for transmission, such as modulators and amplifiers, was borrowed from the Swedish-American company Porion AB.

The cable network in Ursynów quickly expanded, small networks were created, each of which had its own satellite antenna and signal processing equipment. The Eutelsat 1F1 satellite distributed the signal of the stations Sat.1, Super Channel, Teleclub and RTL plus.

The Ursynat Television moved to premises at ul. Meander 15, programmes were also created in the studio at ul. Wałbrzyska, and the television itself became a local programme within the Warsaw Cable Television "Porion", which was taken over by Studio Ursynat. The Porion ceased operations in 1997.

== Meaning ==
The Studio Ursynat was the first private television in Poland and the first local one. It was established during the state monopoly in the final period of the Polish People's Republic. The authorities at the time were not unfavourable to the initiative, as evidenced by the support of important journalists from Telewizja Polska. According to the report, Jan Główczyk, the secretary of propaganda of the Central Committee of the Polish United Workers' Party, said about television: "let them broadcast, it's a minor matter after all".

The cable network created for the needs of the program was also the first such network in Poland. The success of the first cable television in Ursynów led to the emergence of other such initiatives throughout Poland.

== Journalists ==
The TV presenter Jolanta Pieńkowska started her career in Studio Ursynat. Other journalists associated with television included Jan Suzin, Elżbieta Sommer, Andrzej Jefremienko, Barbara Mąkosa-Stępkowska (editor-in-chief), Bartłomiej Bilewicz, Bartosz Kubera, Katarzyna Wełpa, Barbara Olszewska, Monika Krawczyk, Andrzej Rogiński and film critic Andrzej Bukowiecki.
