= Canal+ Kuchnia =

Polish pay television channel

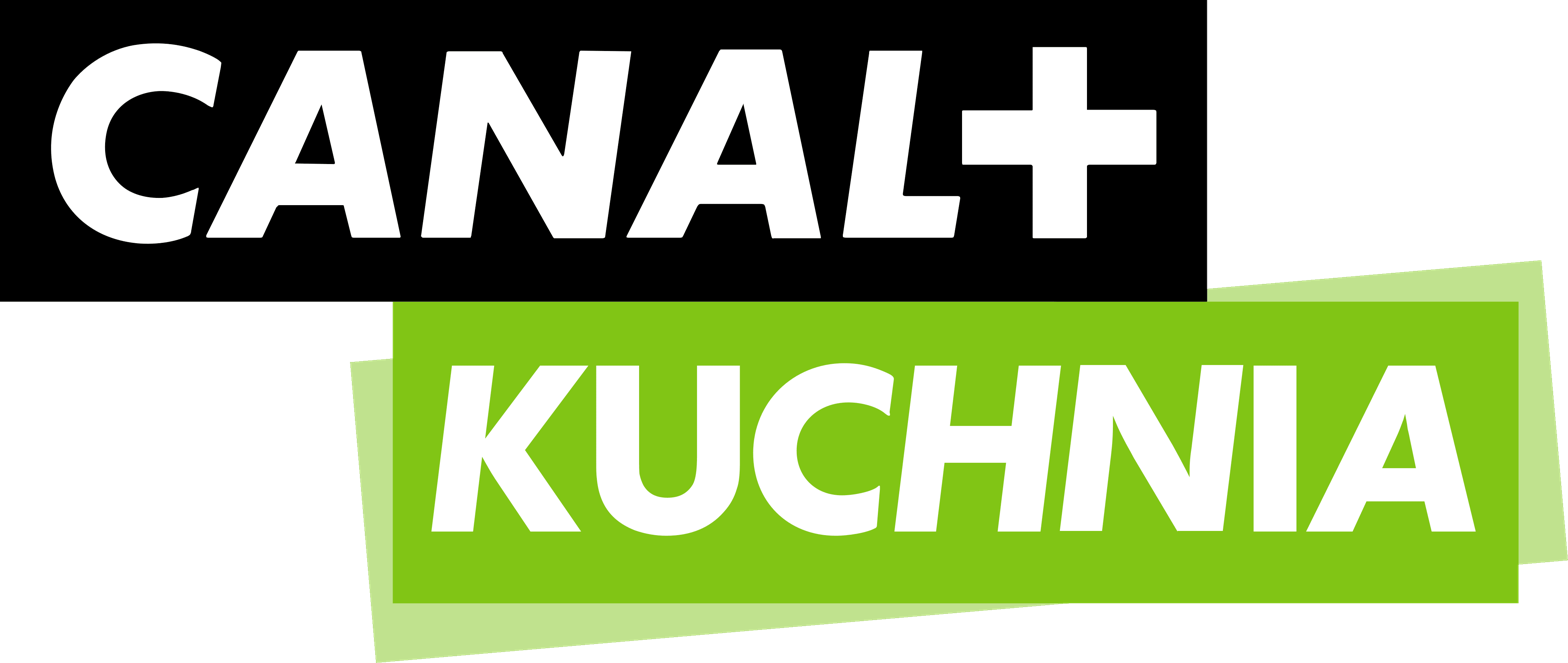
- Country: Poland

Programming
- Picture format: 16:9 576i (SDTV); 1080i (HDTV)

Ownership
- Owner: Canal+ International (Canal+)
- Parent: Canal+ Polska SA
- Sister channels: Canal+ Domo

History
- Launched: 2006
- Former names: Kuchnia.tv (2006-2011); Kuchnia+ (2011-2021)

Links
- Website: www.canalpluskuchnia.pl

Canal+ Kuchnia (formerly known as Kuchnia.tv and Kuchnia+) is a Polish television channel owned and operated by Canal+ International. Canal+ Kuchnia broadcasts programming related to food and cooking.

== Logos ==
2006-2011

2011-2014

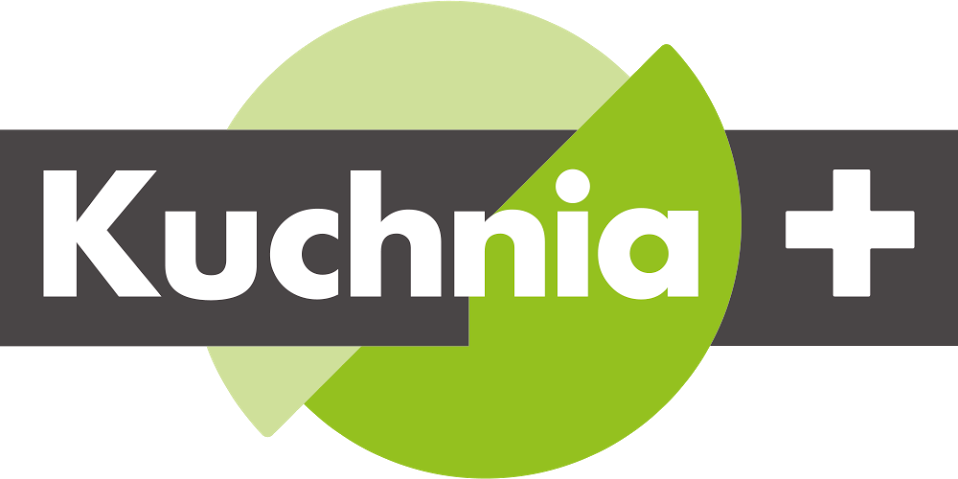
2014-2021

== See also ==
- Canal+ Domo
