= Canal+ Sport 2 (Polish TV channel) =

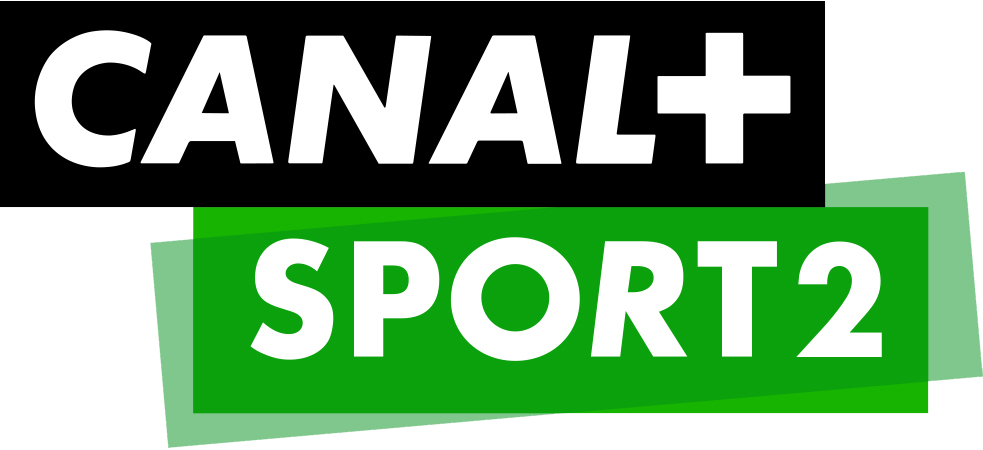
- Country: Poland
- Broadcast area: Poland
- Network: Canal+ Poland
- Headquarters: Warsaw, Poland

Programming
- Language: Polish
- Picture format: 1080i (HDTV)

Ownership
- Owner: Canal+ International (Canal+)
- Parent: Canal+ Polska SA
- Sister channels: Canal+ Sport; Canal+ Sport 3 Canal+ Sport 4 Canal+ Sport 5 Canal+ Extra 1 Canal+ Extra 2 Canal+ Extra 3 Canal+ Extra 4 Canal+ Extra 5 Canal+ Extra 6 Canal+ Extra 7 Canal+ Now

History
- Launched: 11 May 2015; 11 years ago

Links
- Website: www.canalplus.com/pl/sport/

Canal+ Sport 2 is a Polish-language television station broadcast by Canal+ Polska SA and is one of nine channels available in Poland under the French Canal+ network. The channel was launched on 11 May 2015.

The Canal+ Sport 2 name already bears the channel from 13 November 2004 to 30 July 2011, which was then transformed into Canal+ Gol (until 5 April 2013), Canal+ Family 2 (until 11 May 2015) and now broadcasts as Canal+ 1.
