= Tele 5 (Poland) =

Polish television channel

Tele5
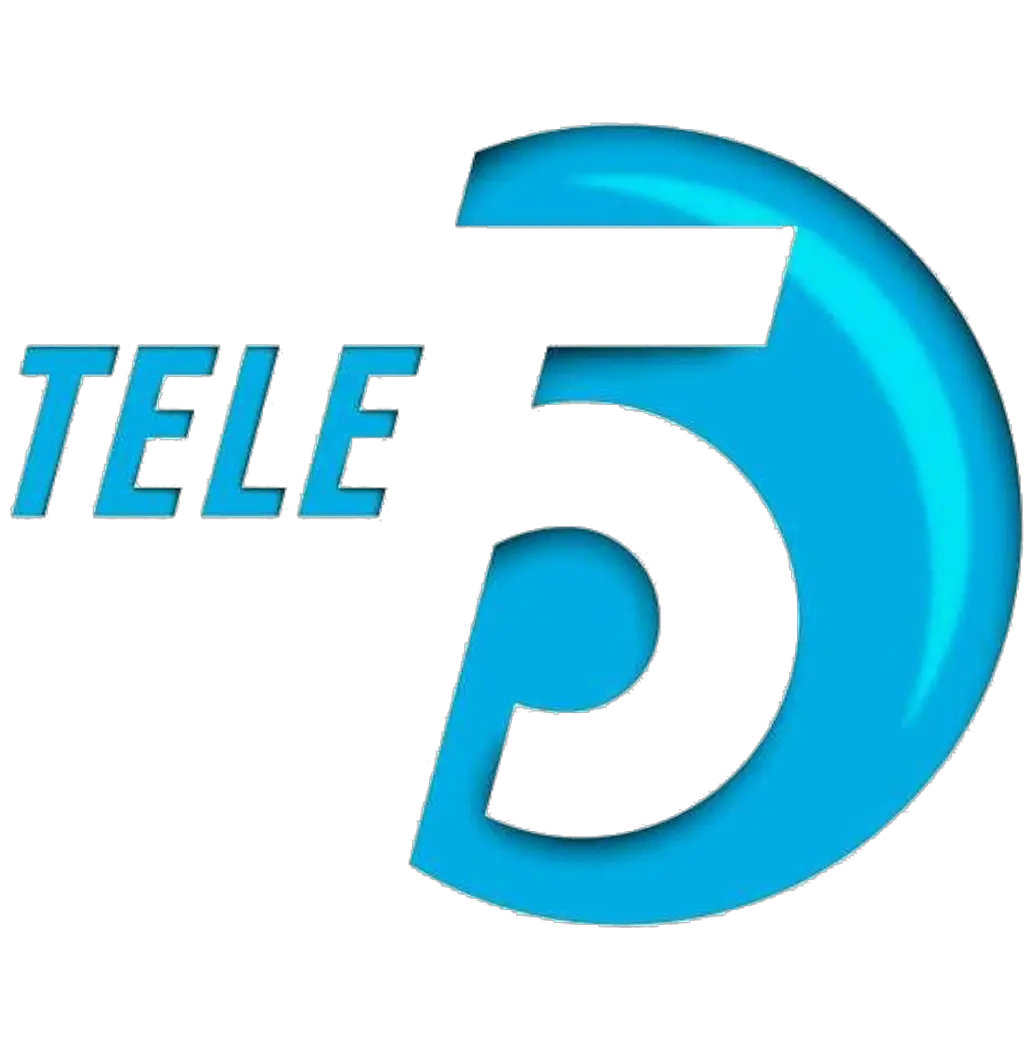
- Country: Poland

Programming
- Picture format: 1080i HDTV (downscaled to 16:9 576i for the SDTV feed)

Ownership
- Owner: Polcast Television
- Sister channels: Polonia 1 Water Planet; Novela TV

History
- Launched: 19 April 2002
- Former names: Super 1

Links
- Website: Official Site

Tele5 is a Polish free-to-air television channel owned by Polcast Television. It was launched on 19 April 2002, replacing Super 1. Originally broadcasting European shows (i.e., its own productions, those of the BBC), it later started showing Canadian series.

== History ==
Tele 5 launched on 19 April 2002, replacing Super 1. The channel broadcast entertainment programmes, mostly films and series. In addition, the channel broadcast documentaries, often devoted to controversial topics, as well as programmes for lovers of extreme sports. In addition to European and American films, the station presented its own journalistic, cultural, entertainment and cooking programmes. In October 2009, Tele 5 launched a free livestream of the channel. From September to November 2012, the car races of the German DTM series and the Italian Superstars series were broadcast. On 5 November 2012, Tele 5 launched its own high-definition feed. On 30 June 2016, the station was placed in the multiplex of local TVT, and on 17 July 2016 it also appeared in the multiplex of TVL.
