= Polonia 1 =

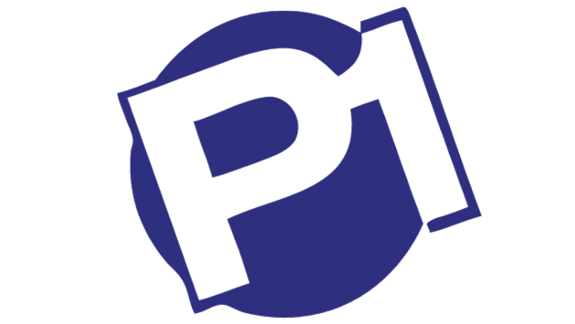
- Country: Poland

Programming
- Picture format: 576i (16:9 SDTV)

Ownership
- Owner: Polcast Television
- Sister channels: Tele 5 Water Planet; Novela TV

History
- Launched: March 7, 1993

Polonia 1 is one of the first Polish commercial television channels, consisting at first of a network of 12 (and - for a short time - even 13) local TV stations in bigger cities. The station was established by Sardinian businessman Nicola Grauso, who shared a connection with Silvio Berlusconi.

== History ==
=== As a network of stations ===
The channel was created with twelve local television stations as the basis, seven of which were launched between 1991 to 1993 at the initiative of Italian entrepreneur Nicola Grauso with the intention of building a nationwide network. Ultimately, the company owned by Grauso acquired a 33% stake in each of the twelve stations. Grauso was already the owner of Videolina, a television station in Sardinia.

The channel began broadcasting on March 7, 1993. A common programming schedule was introduced across all stations. From then on, in addition to their own local broadcasts, they also broadcast a nationwide block of programs produced by Polonia 1. National programming - a roster of Japanese animes, American action-adventure series, telenovelas, feature films and locally produced programming by its affiliates - was delivered by the method of U-matic cassettes, from 4:15pm (15 minutes later in its first weeks) to around midnight. The schedule also included at least four hours of local programming daily, in which its stations could broadcast their own productions. Occasionally, films not offered by Polonia 1 were also included. The remaining airtime was filled by affiliate stations with reruns of the Polonia 1 block or with their own productions. There were exceptions to this – TV Copernicus in Olsztyn broadcast erotic films in the mornings for some time (in the subsequent lawsuit, the chairman of the station was accused of, among other things, copyright infringement).

At that time, Polonia 1 was headquartered in Warsaw in the former Życie Warszawy building (pre-war Domu Prasy) at 3/5 Marszałkowska Street. Together with its twelve affiliates, the channel employed nearly 2,000 people.

Polonia 1's programming was prepared by Fininvest, an Italian media holding company owned by subsequent Italian prime minister Silvio Berlusconi. Fininvest also opened a branch of its advertising agency in Poland, called Publipolska Multimedia, whose task was to acquire advertisers for Polonia 1.

The network quickly gained popularity: at the beginning of 1994, Polonia 1's viewership reached – according to the broadcaster's data – 20% nationwide (8 million viewers).

It's worth noting that in the years when the future Polonia 1 stations began broadcasting, licenses for radio and television broadcasters had not yet been granted, and the regulations governing their issuance were still in the development phase. After the introduction of licensing regulations in 1994, private television stations broadcasting from Poland at the time (with the exception of PTV Echo, which held a temporary broadcasting permit) were deemed to be operating illegally. In the first licensing process, in which Polonia 1, among others, participated, Polsat won the right to broadcast nationwide. One of the Polish National Broadcasting Council's criticisms of Polonia 1 concerned the network's complex and opaque capital structure. This was significant because the permissible share of foreign capital in companies applying for a license could not exceed 33%.

The allocation of local bands also proved unsuccessful for the broadcasters. KRRiT also accused the stations for lacking independence from Italian investors, and it was also claimed that the competition did not envisage the creation of a network based on low-power transmitters. Nevertheless, in early 1995, this supposedly unforeseen network of transmitters in larger cities was allocated to the encrypted channel Canal+. Despite not obtaining a license, the Polonia 1 stations continued broadcasting, attempting in the meantime to challenge the KRRiT's licensing decisions in the Supreme Administrative Court, to no avail.

On August 29, 1994, prosecutors in Warsaw, Krakow, Opole, Lublin, Poznań, and Szczecin (with the support of local anti-terrorist brigades) shut down the Polonia 1 stations that broadcast on frequencies reserved for the military. The broadcasters were accused of posing a direct threat to life – using military bands could theoretically have even caused a plane crash. However, during the trial against the management of Poznań's TV-ES, it was revealed that no one from the Ministry of National Defense intervened in the matter during the period of broadcasting on these bands, so it was concluded that no threat existed.

With the situation in its first stage, on September 13, Polonia 1 began broadcasting from Rome via the Eutelsat satellite. The remaining stations still operating at the time largely or completely ceased producing their own programs, limiting themselves to relaying the network's output via satellite.

The second stage of shutdowns happened 8 days later, on September 21, in the cities of Gdynia, Łódź, Katowice and Olsztyn. The network from then on had two stations left relaying its programming: PTV Echo in Wrocław and TV EX in Bydgoszcz. Both stations ceased broadcasting on March 8th and March 11th respectively, when it was already certain that neither would receive a license.

=== Later years ===
The failure of the licensing process resulted in Nicola Grauso withdrawing from further investments in Poland. He soon disposed of his shares in both the Życie Warszawy newspaper and Polonia 1. Earlier, the station had moved its headquarters from the former "Dom Prasy" to 4 Podskarbińską Street, to the building of the former 1 Maj cinema.

Despite earlier announcements, the stations comprising the Polonia 1 network did not participate in the subsequent licensing process and were soon liquidated. Polonia 1 itself was acquired by entities associated with the Italian company Eurocast Italia: until 2001, Polcast Warszawa, and subsequently Fincast. In 1996, the station changed its programming, focusing on Polish-produced entertainment and advice programs, and its graphic design. Since 1997, it has shared broadcasting time with the Top Shop channel (and in the past, temporarily, with the encrypted adult channel Eurotica (later Rendez Vous), as well as the then-launching Qatari news channel Al Jazeera).

In 1998, the Super 1 channel was launched, whose offer consisted mainly of series and films shown on Polonia 1 in the early 1990s, as well as – common to both channels – own productions.

From the mid-1990s to 2002, Polonia 1 (and later Super 1) was broadcast from many European countries, including Italy, Croatia, and Slovenia. In June 2001, Polonia 1 and Super 1 encountered technical problems. For two weeks, satellite transmission of both programs disappeared completely. The stations then resumed broadcasting, this time from the United Kingdom.

In 2002, a new channel, Tele 5, was launched by Fincast in place of the Super 1 channel . Broadcasting of both programs from abroad was then discontinued, and the broadcast studios were moved to Warsaw. Tele 5 began its test broadcast on April 17, 2002, and officially launched two days later. Polonia 1 then introduced a completely new logo, reminiscent of the Tele 5 logo, and a completely redesigned graphic design. Both channels soon moved their headquarters from the building they had occupied for years at 4 Podskarbińska Street in Warsaw to the Zepter office building at 37 Domaniewska Street. The current headquarters are at 50 Domaniewska Street.

Polonia 1 became a niche channel, airing programming that was difficult to find on other channels. At the time, the station aired Italian and American classics, as well as contemporary American and European cinema, anime, soap operas, series, documentaries, entertainment, sports, and erotic programming. It shared its airtime with the teleshopping channel Top Shop.
