= GWO =

GWO may refer to:

- Gdańskie Wydawnictwo Oświatowe, a Polish publishing house
- Gebrüder Weiss–Oberndorfer, an Austrian cycling team
- Google Website Optimizer
- Great-West Lifeco, a Canadian financial holding company
- Greenwood–Leflore Airport, in Mississippi
