= Skreta =

Skreta, Škréta or Skręta are surnames of various origins. Notable people with the surname include:

- Karel Škréta (1610–1674), Czech painter
- Sławomir Skręta, Polish music producer
- Vasiliki Skreta, Greek-American economist
