= Gdańskie Wydawnictwo Oświatowe =

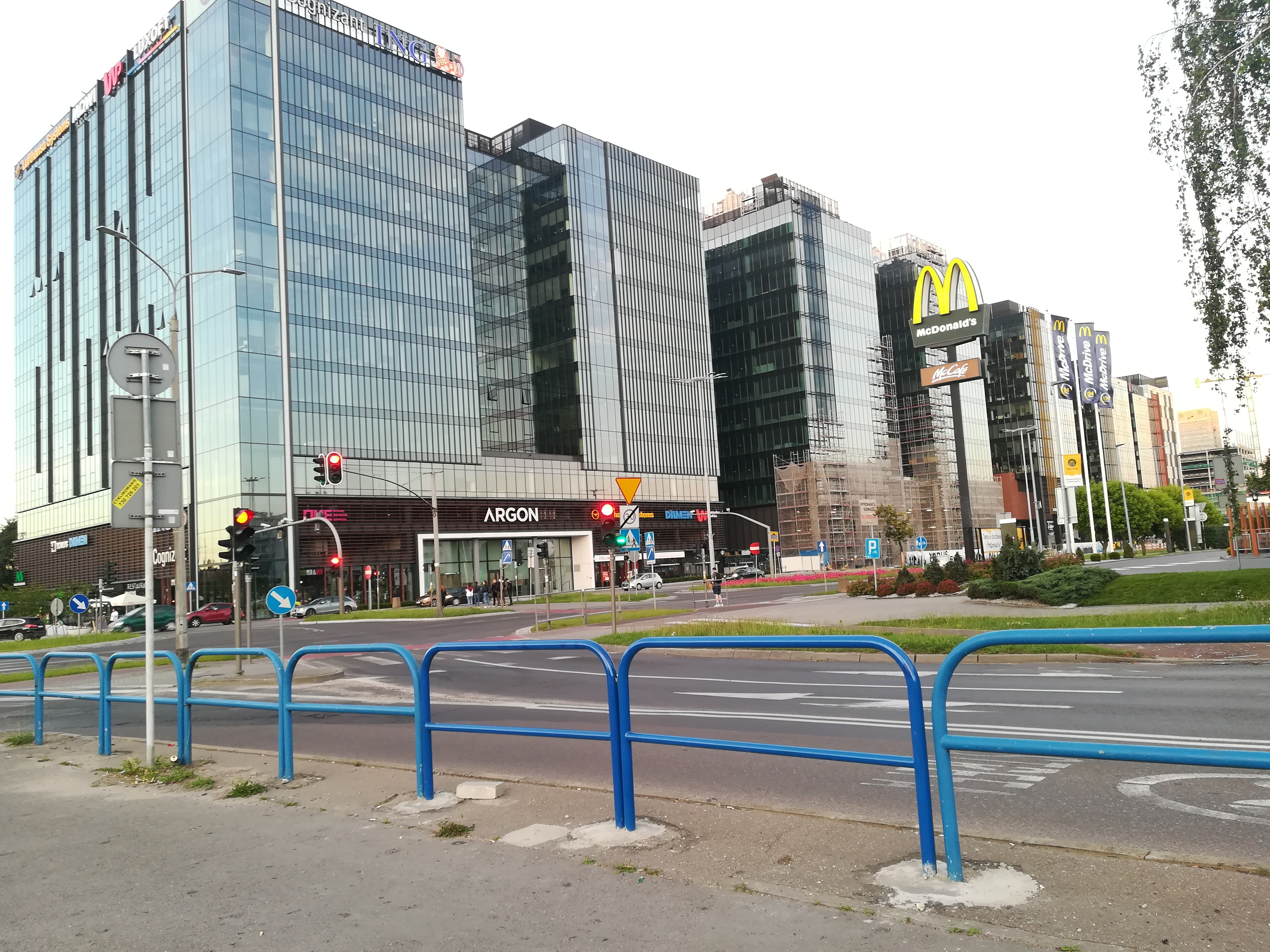
- The Alchemia business park in Gdańsk, its headquarters
- Company type: general partnership
- Industry: Publishing house
- Headquarters: Aleja Grunwaldzka 413, 80-309 Gdańsk, Poland
- Area served: Poland
- Key people: Ewa Makowska-Smolińska
- Products: textbooks, multimedia, e-books
- Website: http://www.gwo.pl

Gdańskie Wydawnictwo Oświatowe (GWO) is a publishing house headquartered in Gdańsk, Poland, publishing textbooks for primary and high school.

== History ==
Gdańskie Wydawnictwo Oświatowe was founded in 1991, initially publishing a series of mathematics textbooks and notebooks. In 2014, it opened its offices in Alchemia, a complex of buildings in Oliwa, taking up more than 2,500 square metres (27,000 ft^{2}) of floor area. In 2020, a controversy erupted over the words of the disco polo song "Przez Twe oczy zielone" by Zenon Martyniuk appearing in a textbook for Polish class published by GWO.

During the COVID-19 pandemic in Poland, GWO was one of the publishers supported by the city government of Gdańsk. In March 2020, the company gained a new owner, Ewa Makowska-Smolińska, although the former owner, Małgorzata Dobrowolska, remained in majority control of the company along with her two sons.

== Products ==
GWO publishes textbooks for teaching mathematics, Polish, history, physics, biology, and art, among others.
