= Mohair berets =

Polish expression

The "army of mohair berets", a photo published by Gazeta Wyborcza

"Mohair berets" (Polish: moherowe berety) is a tongue-in-cheek expression that stands for people who support the views expressed by the Polish conservative-nationalistic Catholic movement, whose main representative is Father Tadeusz Rydzyk. This expression originated from the characteristic headgear worn by the stereotypical representatives of this circle.

== History ==
The expression “mohair berets” was used for the first time in 2004 and it referred to the people who were regularly attending masses in Gdańsk celebrated by Henryk Jankowski, the parish priest. When he was dismissed from his post, the same parishioners staged demonstrations in his defence. A beret made of mohair or its imitation, and often a handmade one, is commonly associated with its typical wearers, mostly poor elderly ladies. That is the exact social environment of many of Jankowski's followers who were shown on television. Probably the first article which introduced the expression “mohair berets” to the Polish press was the one published in the daily Rzeczpospolita from 23 October 2004 titled “Labyrinths of the parish priest”. It reads as follows: “Old ladies have their eyes fixed on Father Jankowski and they hang on his every word. Rumour has it that the prelate has his own legion of mohair berets in Gdańsk.” The expression has spread over the journalism and discussions on Internet forums and started to be used when referring to broader social groups, mostly active listeners of the Catholic radio station Radio Maryja. The term “mohair berets” became commonly used after Robert Górecki, a photojournalist of Gazeta Wyborcza, published the photograph on the Internet which depicted the 14th anniversary of Radio Maryja in December 2005. The picture showed numerous listeners of the radio with berets on their heads. Then the term entered the language of politics and became partly associated with the supporters of those parties which were given plenty of broadcast time on Radio Maryja during the election campaign in 2005, especially the electorate of the League of Polish Families (LPR) and Law and Justice (PiS).

== The mohair coalition ==
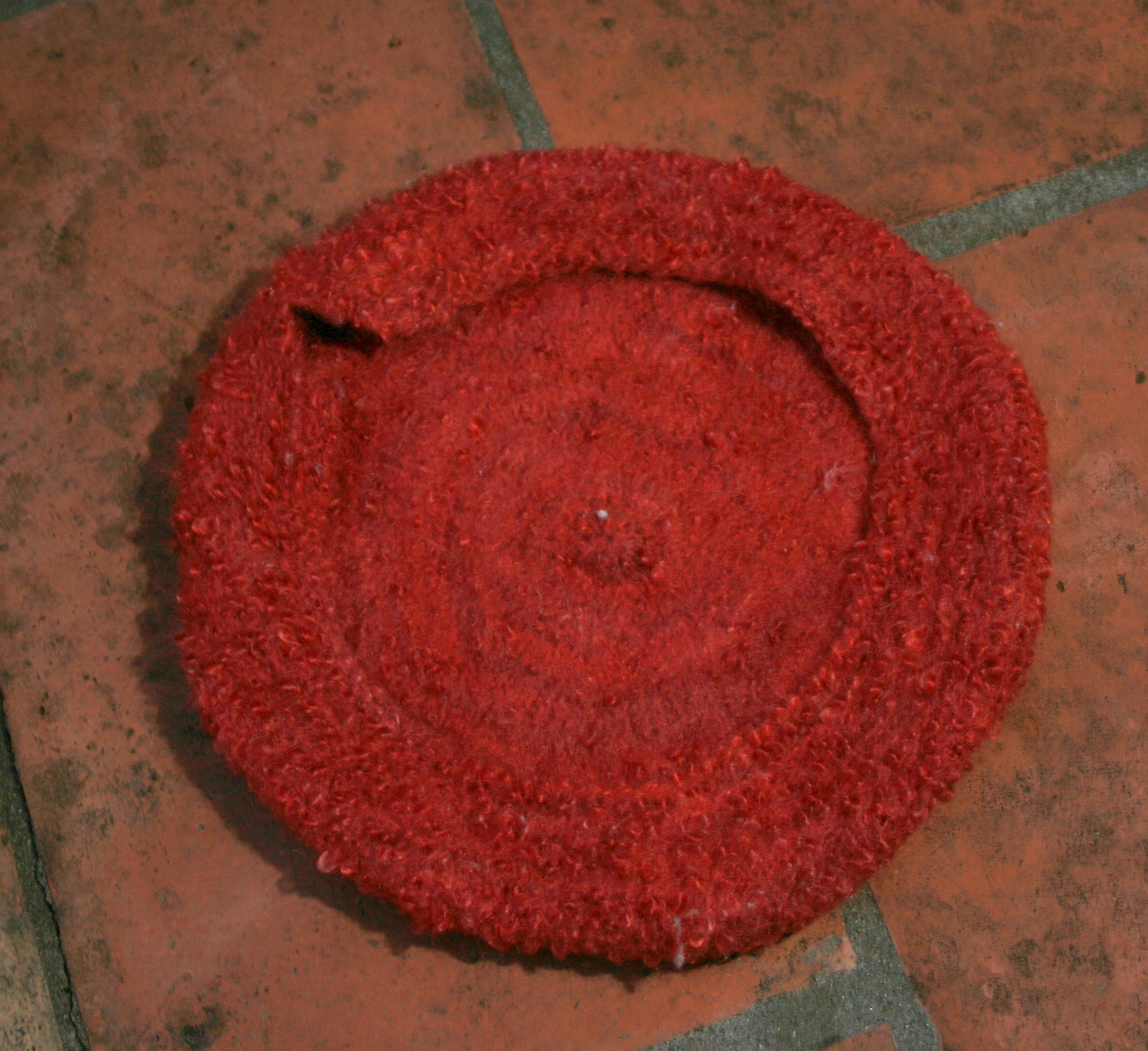
A typical mohair beret

The phrase "mohair berets" gained a widespread popularity in colloquial language, particularly in some political skirmishes. An example of such a reference is the term "mohair coalition" used by Donald Tusk during the debate in Sejm on the inaugural address of a newly designated Prime Minister Kazimierz Marcinkiewicz on 10 November 2005. "Poland deserves more than what is currently known as a mohair coalition", said Donald Tusk. The PO leader used such an expression to describe an unofficial parliamentary coalition of PiS, the LPR and Self-Defence. He also suggested that the coalition existed even though PiS persisted in denying it. Donald Tusk officially apologised to the indignant pensioner Julita Kon for his statement when confronted with her in Olsztyn on 30 November 2005, the day when he was on his way to meet with the members of the housing cooperative Domator in Olsztyn who kept demanding to call the general meeting of the cooperative for almost two weeks.

The coalition described by Tusk was observed in many votes in Sejm and it was officially sealed later by the so-called "stabilisation pact" (an agreement between PiS, the LPR and Self-Defence on their cooperation in the parliament) followed by forming a coalition by those parties. The term has not appeared in Polish media since 2005.

== Parodies ==
The mohair berets are a leitmotiv of the satirical song Mohair berets recorded by Big Cyc which was released in April 2006 on the album of the same title. The photographs promoting the album showed the band members wearing mohair berets. As soon as in May of the same year Kabaret OT.TO presented the parody of the hip hop song titled Mohair neighbours. The phenomenon of mohair berets is also a key theme of skits (called Mohair programme) performed by cabaret Neo-Nówka from Wrocław as well as the song Moherowy ninja (Mohair ninja) from the album Gra? recorded by the alternative rock band L-Dópa.

== Statistics ==
The social group called “mohair berets” came under close scrutiny conducted by one of the companies dealing with personal data processing. Its analyses showed that mohair berets accounts for 3.1 per cent of the overall Polish population, the typical representatives of the group analysed being mostly married couple over 50 years old, whose children have already left the nest. As much as 80 per cent of them have only elementary or elementary plus vocational education, 36 per cent of the group are blue collar workers. According to the analyses those people avoid modern technologies (over 50 per cent have not opened a bank account and only one out of four people use mobile phones). The analysis proves that due to the low incomes the group members have to make sure that their bills do not exceed 100 PLN per month so they do their shopping in small shops or cheap discount shops. They usually spend their free time on an allotment (gardening plots are widespread in Poland for dwellers of high-rise flats), solve crosswords and puzzles or go fishing. A minority of those surveyed never go on holidays, 73 per cent spend their time off at home.

== See also ==
- Blue rinse brigade
- Poland A and B
- Beret
- Flat cap
