= Zenon Martyniuk =

Polish singer and guitarist (born 1969)

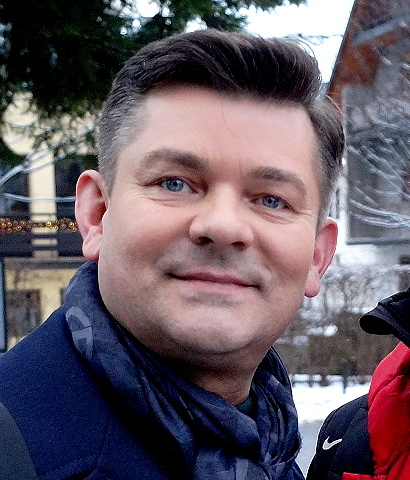
- Zenon Martyniuk in 2018

Background information
- Born: 23 June 1969 (age 57); Gredele, Poland
- Genres: Disco polo; Euro disco; Eurodance; dance-pop
- Occupations: Singer; songwriter; record producer
- Instruments: Vocals; guitar
- Years active: 1989–present
- Formerly of: Akcent
- Spouse: Danuta Martyniuk (m. 1989)

Zenon "Zenek" Martyniuk (born 23 June 1969) is a Polish singer and guitarist performing music from the disco polo genre.

== Biography ==
=== Family and education ===
He is the son of Bazyli and Teresa Martyniuk, who were farmers. He has a sister, Wioletta, who is three years older. He comes from a mixed religious family – his mother is Roman Catholic and his father was Orthodox. In infancy, he was baptized in the Orthodox church and was raised as a Roman Catholic. He grew up in a family with musical traditions: his grandmother and mother sang, and his uncles played in bands at village parties. He himself began his musical education as a child, from early childhood he graced school events and academies with his performances.

After completing his education in the eighth grade of primary school, he began performing for a living with various music bands at local events and wedding receptions, in addition to practicing football and running, and was involved in scouting. He graduated from the 4th General Secondary School in Białystok and the Economics School at the Władysław Stanisław Reymont School Complex No. 3 in Bielsk Podlaski. He can sing in the following languages: Romani, Belarusian and Russian.

=== Professional career ===
During a performance at a wedding reception, he was spotted by Zenobiusz Gul, who offered him a chance to play in his band Akord. He also performed in the following bands: Centrum, Zenki, Orfeusz and Venus. At the end of 1989, together with Mariusz Anikiej, he founded the band Akcent. In the summer of 1991, he went to Belgium, where he played his first concerts for the local Polonia. In the years 1991–1993, after Anikiej left for Belgium, he performed in the bands Ex-Akcent together with Henryk Meller, with whom he released three albums: Szczęśliwy czas, Piękna niedziela and Kolędy. In addition, he was involved in the band Crazy Boys, with whom he recorded several songs for the Blue Star label and in 1992 performed in Warsaw's Congress Hall at the Gala Piosenki Popularnej i Chodnikowej.

After Anikiej returned to Poland in 1993, they reactivated the band Akcent. Until the end of the 90s, he had a number of hits with the band, including: Życie to są chwile, Moja gwiazda and Królowa nocy, the latter two of which are covers of foreign songs. In 1994, he also released a solo studio album entitled Wspomnienie.

In 2006, he released an album entitled Do Ciebie, which he recorded with Waldemar Oksztul from the group Imperium. In the new millennium, he recorded more albums with Akcent and released covers such as: Pragnienie miłości, Przekorny los or the song Przez twe oczy zielone. The music video for the latter was a huge commercial success, becoming the second video for a Polish song to exceed 100 million views on YouTube.

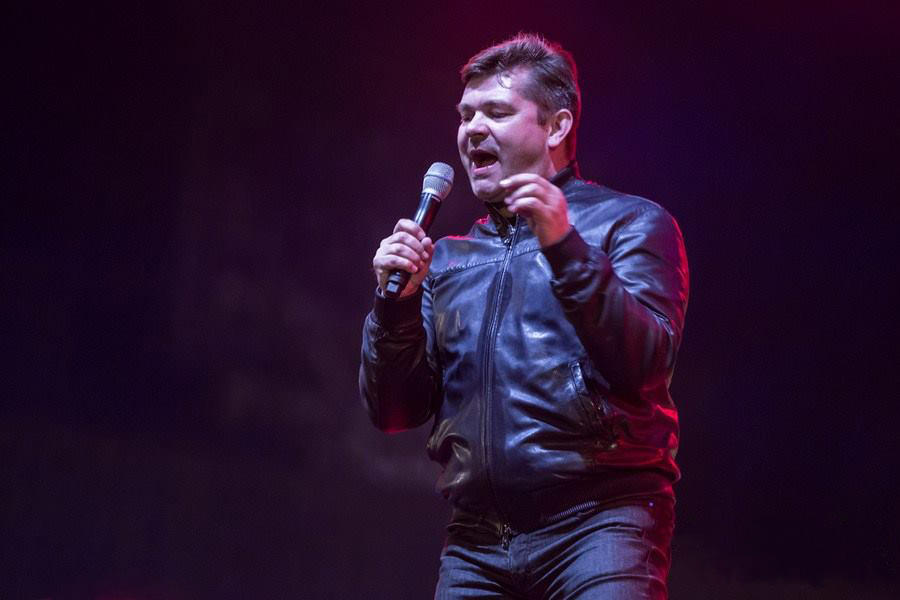
Zenon Martyniuk in 2016

He guest starred in the film Miszmasz, czyli kogel-mogel 3 (2019) and in one of the episodes of the series Lombard. Życie pod zastaw (2021). In 2020, he became the face of the advertising campaign of the chain of stores MediaMarkt and made a guest appearance in Jan Hryniak's film Zenek (2020), the plot of which was based on Martyniuk's biography. In 2024, he became one of the jurors of the entertainment program Disco Star on Polo TV. He also appeared in a commercial for Delikatesy Centrum as part of the Disco Promo campaign.

== Discography ==
=== Albums ===
Title	Released
Wspomnienie	1994
Do Ciebie... (with Waldemar Oksztul)	2006
Ja gnam przed siebie	2019

=== Singles ===
Title	Released
Za zdrowie pań (with Edward Hulewicz)	2015
Jola	2019
Nasza jest ta noc (with Adam Chrola)	2019
Nie wolno zabić tej miłości	2020
Classy Girl	2021
To ja ciebie wołam	2022
Dziki Zachód	2023
Będę zawsze tam gdzie ty	2024
Jak mam cię pokochać	2024
Złoto (with Marcin Miller, Defis, Sławomir, Miły Pan, Radosław Liszewski, M.I.G, Magdalena Narożna, Łobuzy, Skolim as Roztańczona Reprezentacja)	2024
Bez Ciebie nie ma nas	2024
Zabiorę Ciebie	2024
Tańcz (with Sławomir, Akcent)	2024
Ostatni raz	2024
Tańcz Bachata (with Sławomir, Akcent)	2024
