= Toples =

Polish band

Toples is a Polish disco polo musical group. The group's leader and vocalist is Marcin Siegieńczuk. The group was created in 1998.

== Discography ==
- Przestań kłamać mała (1998)
- Ciało do ciała (1999)
- Kochaś (2000)
- Kobiety rządzą nami (2001)
- Ale szopka! (2001)
- Nie mydło, nie granat (2002)
- Gdzie strona tam żona (2003)
- 1998 - 2003 (2004)
- Zostajemy do końca (2005)
- Moje piosenki - moje życie 1998 - 2008 (2008)
