= Disco polo =

Polish music genre

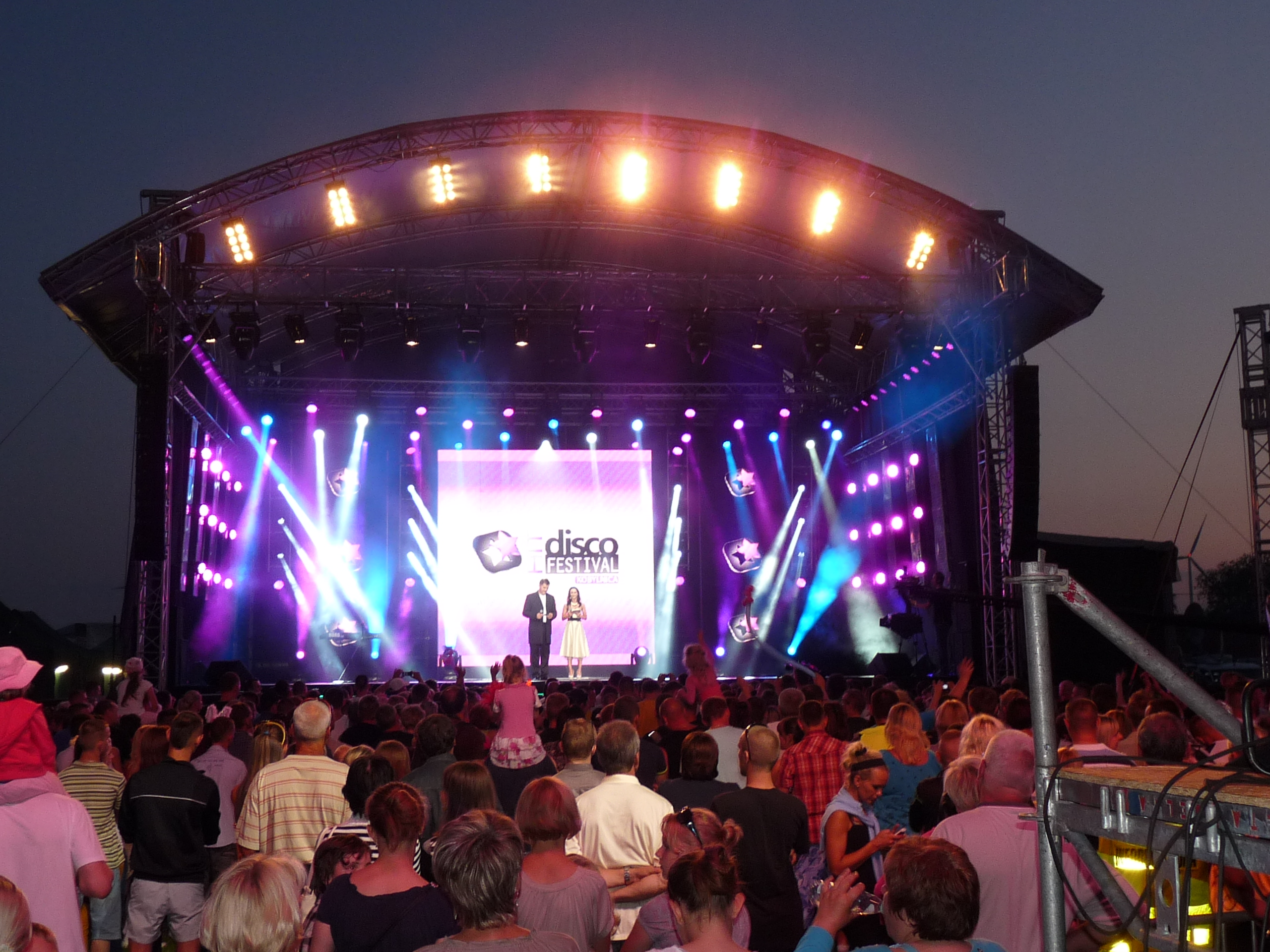
- A disco polo festival in Kobylnica, 2012
- Stylistic origins: Europop; Polish folk music; Eurodisco; Eurodance; Romani music
- Cultural origins: Late 1980s, Poland

Disco polo is a genre of popular dance music, created in Poland in the 1980s. It was initially known as sidewalk music (Polish: muzyka chodnikowa) or backyard music (Polish: muzyka podwórkowa). This genre, a type of Polish urban folk music, had great popularity in the 1990s, peaking in 1995–1997, then gradually declining in popularity through the early 21st century. The genre then had a resurgence in the winter of 2007. The Polish PWN dictionary defines the genre as a Polish variant of disco music, with simple melodies and often ribald lyrics.

== Characteristics ==
Classic disco polo songs are characterised by simple chord progressions and melodies, and take further influence from the steady rhythms found in folk music. These are often accompanied by syncopated samples of drums, synthesisers and keyboard instruments. The genre is dominated by compositions in the 4/4 time signature. Lyrics are often sentimental and playful, written around themes of love and sometimes holidays.

== History ==
=== Roots of the genre ===
The genre originates from music played at weddings by bands with a repertoire of Polish folk music and wedding songs. Later, electronic instruments were adopted over traditional acoustic instruments. The most common lyrical themes included melodramatic lyrics about unrequited love. The genre was additionally influenced by other popular music styles within Europe.

Pioneers of the genre include the band Bayer Full, which was founded on 19 November 1984, and Top One, formed in 1986.

In the late 1980s and early 1990s, more bands emerged, such as Akcent, Atlantis, Boys, and Fanatic. Blue Star, a record label in Reguły, was the first official record label that published disco polo in Poland. This new style of music was called muzyka chodnikowa (lit. 'sidewalk music') by label owner Sławomir Skręta, which was a reference to the main means of distribution: records were sold primarily in stalls on streets and bazaars. Scenes were centered in Białystok and other cities in the province of Podlaskie, with regional scenes in Żyrardów and Sochaczew. "Mydełko Fa" ('The Fa Soap'), recorded in 1991 by Marek Kondrat and Marlena Drozdowska, was created as a parody of the genre, but ended up popularising it further.

Sidewalk music was played at country picnics, county depots, weddings, as well as political campaigns for Polish parliament and president. Former President Aleksander Kwaśniewski is a notable example of a politician who used disco polo during his presidential campaign.

=== From the 1990s to 2002 ===
Skręta coined the name disco polo in 1993, taking influence from the name Italo disco. The name caught on and replaced sidewalk music. On 29 February 1992, a TVP1 broadcast dedicated to disco polo named Gala Piosenki Chodnikowej i Popularnej ('Gala of Sidewalk and Popular Songs') was held.

The genre was extensively marketed by the Polsat TV station, which produced its own disco polo hit lists for several TV shows: Disco Relax (which premiered on 4 December 1994) and Disco Polo Live (which premiered 3 February 1996 on the network). The genre also found its way onto Radio Eska and Polonia 1, a network of local stations in urban areas, as well as TV Polonia. It was considered a symbol of kitsch and primitivism by the mainstream media.

Bands and singers used disco polo during election campaigns. Traditional instruments came to be replaced by keyboards later in the 1990s, which contributed to a slight change in style, making the songs more akin to Eurodance. Artists also started mixing the genre with other musical genres such as dance music, house music, and techno.

TVP1 aired a disco polo program entitled Karnawałowa Gala Disco Polo ('Carnival Disco Polo Gala') on 31 December 1995.

In 1996, Maria Zmarz-Koczanowicz and Michał Arabudzkii directed a documentary film called Bara Bara, which explored the disco polo trend. It was aired in the same year on TVP1. On 24 April 1998, the film Kochaj i rób co chcesz ('Love and Do What You Will') was released by Robert Gliński, in which the main character leaves to play disco polo on the piano in a club.

The trend receded between 1997 and 2001. A sharp decline in sales of disco polo cassettes and CDs ensued due to the growth of Polish and foreign pop music, rock, hip hop, dance, and electronic music. The genre's airplay on Radio Eska, Polonia 1 and TV Polonia diminished. In late August 2002, Polsat TV cancelled Disco Relax and Disco Polo Live, leaving many bands jobless. Some observers believe that the genre's drastic decline in popularity was in part caused by the emigration of disco polo musicians to the United States, where some artists continued their work.

=== After 2002 ===
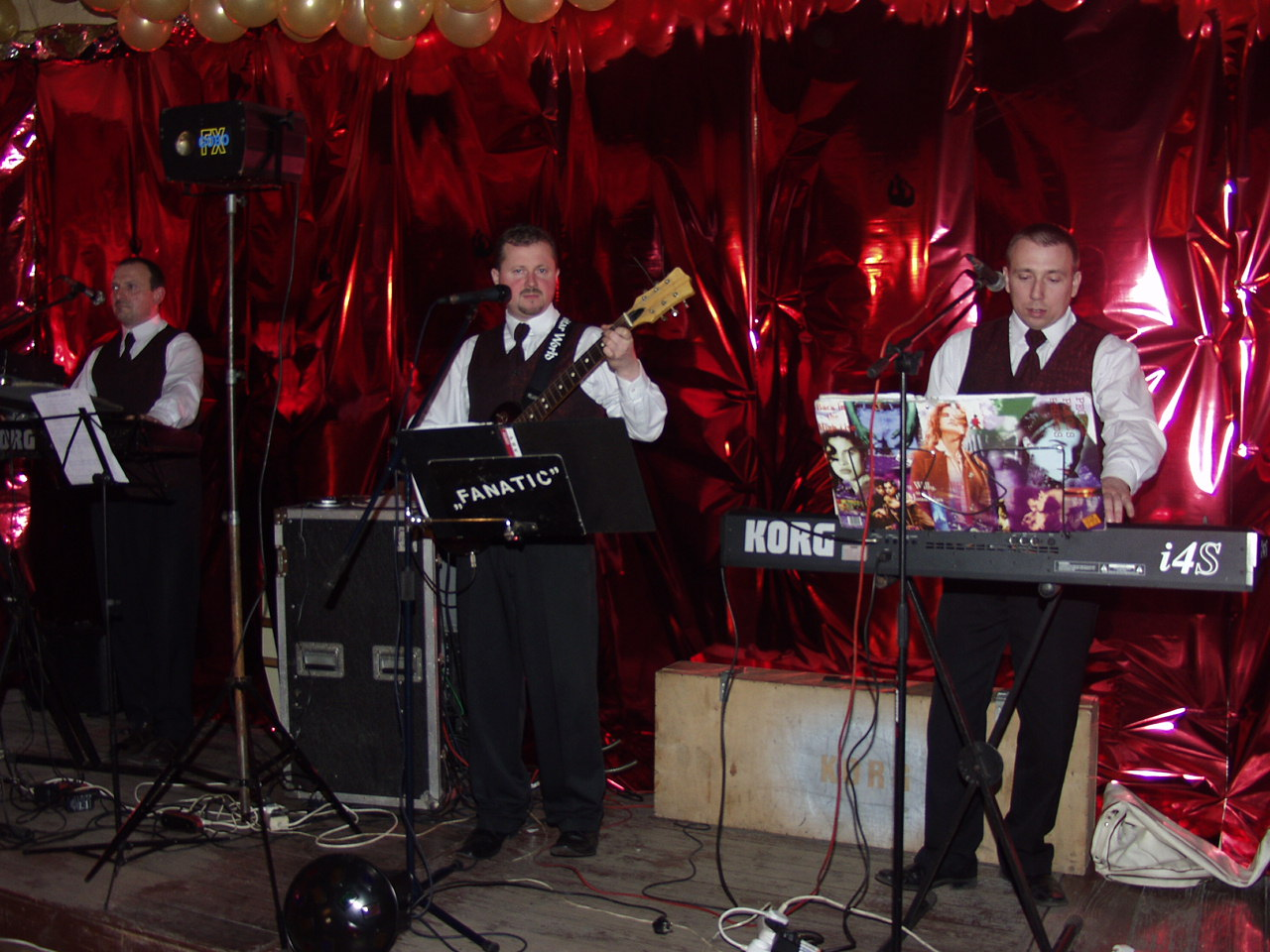
The band Fanatic

From 2002 to 2007, several bands released new disco polo albums (e.g. Toples and Weekend), but the genre remained obscure. On 12 August 2004, an article by Wojciech Orliński was published in Gazeta Wyborcza titled "Śmierć disco polo" ('The death of disco polo') describing the decline of the genre at the turn of the 21st century.

On 6 August 2006, TVN aired a program called Kulisy sławy ('Behind the scenes of fame') of the Uwaga! series, dedicated to the revival of the genre. The program was recognised as the best report of 2006 in an internet poll. In 2007, after a five-year hiatus, the genre returned to television through the station iTV, which broadcast the Discostacja program daily. In addition, two Internet radio stations associated with it held a promotion. Starting in 2007, disco polo bands began playing shows again.

On 5 July 2008, the disco polo show Nie tylko Barachołka ('Not just Barachołka'), formerly known as Barachołka, returned to Polskie Radio Lublin. As of 2012 it was broadcast on weekends.

In the first three months of 2009, the genre was promoted by the Edusat channel. In March 2009, iTV resumed its Disco Polo Live program from 2002, although the broadcast was suspended in March 2011. Since 7 May 2011 Disco Polo Live has been broadcast on Polo TV. On 4 October 2009, a new program produced by Maciej Jamróz called Disco Bandżo ('Disco banjo') was featured on Tele 5.

On 5 December 2010, the channel VIVA Polska began airing a dance music program called Disco ponad wszystko ('Disco above all') every Sunday. It doubled the channel's viewership, which steadily increased after each episode, but the program was removed after eighteen months on the channel. CSB TV also broadcast the genre, but the channel was discontinued in May 2012.

On 7 May 2011, Polo TV was launched, a television channel dedicated primarily to disco polo music. The channel has been broadcast on digital TV since 19 December 2011 and became the most watched music channel in Poland. On 27 September 2011, the channel TV.DISCO was launched, which broadcast the genre alongside disco, dance, and electronic music, and as of January 2015 remained on air. The Disco Relax program, which aired in the 1990s on Polsat, was meant to resume on TV.DISCO but eventually returned on 12 February 2012, on Polo TV.

On 20 October 2012, the program Vipo Disco Polo Hits led by Wojciech Grodzki moved from the TVS channel to Polo TV. It was aired weekly until 30 December 2017.

In 2011, director Maciej Bochniak produced a documentary entitled Miliard Szczęśliwych Ludzi ('A Billion Happy People') about the travels of Bayer Full and their performances in China.

On 1 December 2012, Polsat launched a new program dedicated to the genre entitled Imperium Disco Polo (lit. 'Disco Polo Empire'), which played re-runs from Polsat Play. However, at the beginning of March 2013 the program was taken off Polsat, due to the emergence of new episodes of the series Holiday Diaries, but new episodes were still available on cable networks and digital platforms of Polsat Play. From 21 April to June 2013, the program aired on ATM Rozrywka, and since 3 August 2013 is shown on Polsat 2.

From 8 April to 1 December 2013, the genre was promoted by Radio Plus, which changed its slogan from Łagodne Przeboje ('Gentle hits') to Zawsze w Rytmie ('Always in Rhythm'). In addition to streaming disco polo, there were also dance songs from the 1980s and 1990s. On 1 December 2013, this music was moved to the Vox FM radio station. This change was due to protests from Radio Plus listeners and from bishops who owned Radio Plus station licenses.

On 17 August 2013, Telewizja Polsat broadcast the Disco Pod Żaglami ('Disco Sailing') concert featuring the disco polo bands Akcent, Shazza, Boys, Classic and Weekend. This was the first disco polo concert since the genre's programs were removed from the station over 10 years prior, and it was viewed by 2.7 million people.

On 1 May 1, 2014, Telewizja Polsat launched Disco Polo Music, another TV channel dedicated to the genre.

In early February 2015, the channel TV.DISCO completely removed disco polo from its schedule. On 27 February 2015, Maciej Bochniak's film Disco Polo hit movie theatres, which tells the story of a group of musicians who reached the top of the genre's charts. On 26 February 2015, in connection with the release of the film, an episode of Hala odlotów ('Waiting room') aired on TVP Kultura, dedicated to the genre.

On 4 December 2017, as a result of an agreement with the ZPR Media group, Telewizja Polsat acquired 100% of the shares in Lemon Records, the broadcaster of disco polo stations Polo TV and Vox Music TV, thus becoming the owner of both.

The two most popular Polish songs on YouTube are of the disco polo genre. For a long time, the first most viewed song was "Ona tańczy dla mnie" ("She dances for me") by Weekend. At the end of June 2017, achieving over 106 million views, the song "Przez twe oczy zielone" ("Because of your green eyes") by Akcent beat Weekend's record.

Since 2002, this genre has often been combined with dance music and other genres of electronic dance music, e.g. power dance, Eurodance, nu-electro and techno. Songs of this genre often also contain elements of folk music and pop music. The bands and artists which gained significant popularity after 2002 are, among others: After Party, Weekend, Andre, Czadoman, Tomasz Niecik, Eva Basta, Masters, DJ Disco ft. MC Polo, Cliver, Effect and Power Play. Disco polo is also popular outside of Poland, especially among the Polish diaspora. In 2016, the genre experienced a new revival in Poland after the 2016 New Year's Eve party, when the TV channel TVP2 invited the frontman of Akcent, Zenon Martyniuk, one of the most popular disco polo performers, to perform on the main stage. The president of Telewizja Polska Jacek Kurski also expressed joy at the fact that the genre is no longer ironically hated, as the performance was enjoyed by many people present at the event.

== In Polish mass media ==
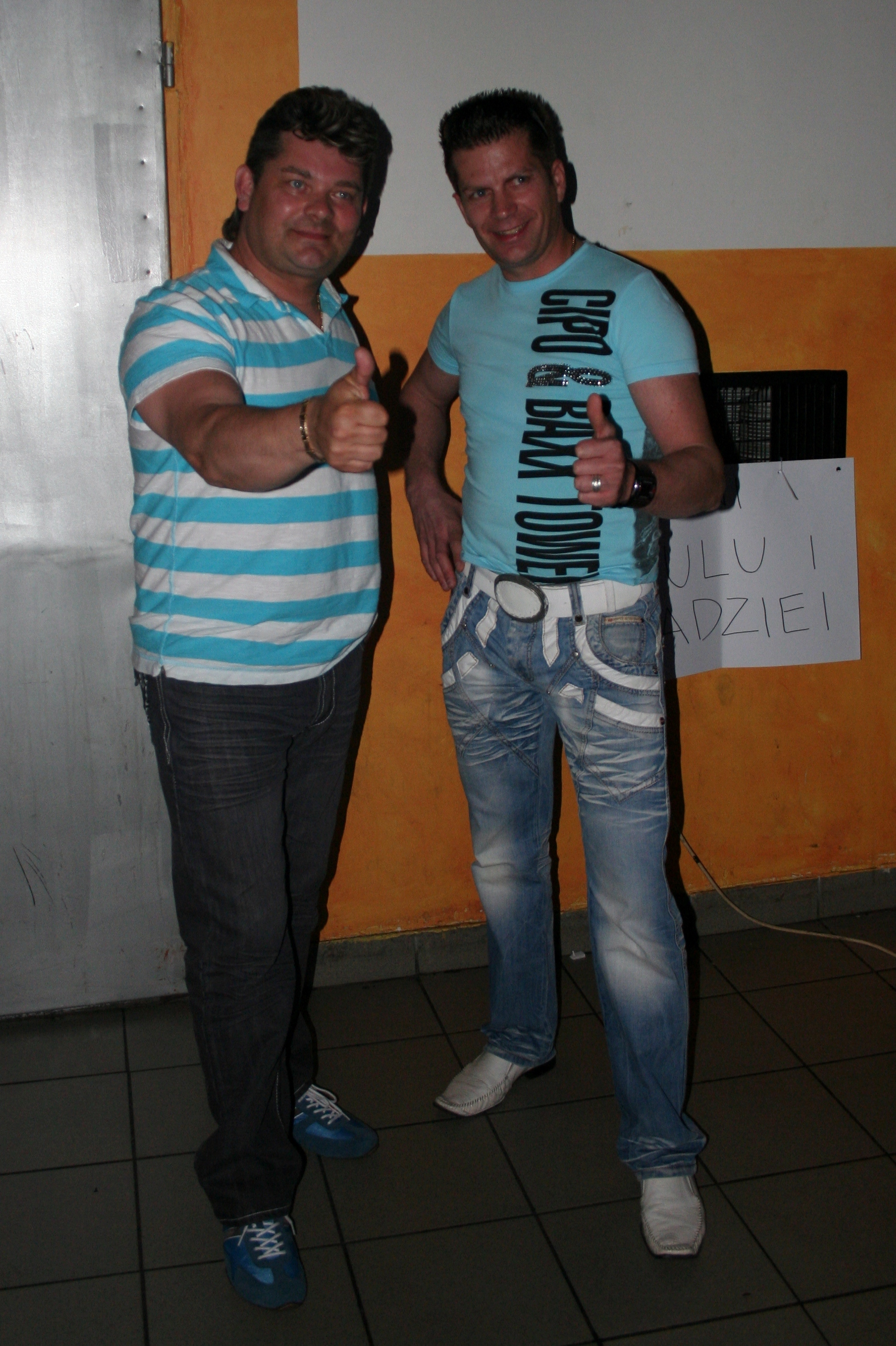
The band Akcent

From the mid-1990s to the turn of the century, television and radio programs devoted to disco polo were broadcast by Polsat stations, Radio Eska, Polonia 1, TV Polonia, and some regional radio stations and local cable networks. Since 2007, interest in disco polo has grown, which is reflected in a greater presence of this music in some media and the increased number of concerts played. However, the genre is still considered a sign of bad taste by many radio stations and television channels and is not promoted by them.

Since 2007, TV stations that have promoted disco polo include Polo TV, iTV, Polsat 2, TVS, Polonia 1, Disco Polo Music, TVR, VOX Music TV, Power TV, Polsat Play, Eska TV, TV.DISCO, VIVA Polska, Polsat, Puls 2, Tele 5, ATM Rozrywka, Kino Polska Muzyka, as well as TV4 and TV6. This genre is also promoted by some radio stations and internet sites such as Radio FTB, Discoparty.pl, Disco-Polo.fm, Discostacja and IRN, as well as regional stations including Radio Express, Radio Hit, Radio Jard, Radio Kaszëbë, Polish Radio Kielce, Radio Leliwa, Polish Radio Lublin, Radio Silesia and Radio Plus, and transregional stations Vox FM and radio WAWA. Online social video services such as YouTube and the site Wrzuta.pl, which existed from 2006 to 2017, also had a significant impact on the renewed interest in disco polo.

In the summer, several disco polo festivals take place, the largest of which from 1996 to 2011 was the National Festival of Music and Dance in Ostróda (originally held in Koszalin), and since 2011 is the Disco Hit Festival, in Kwakowo near Kobylnica. The biggest stars of Polish dance music perform at these festivals and thousands of fans attend from all over Poland. Disco polo bands and performers also participate in many charity concerts and events including during the Great Orchestra of Christmas Charity. At the end of 2016 a well-known disco polo band, Akcent (Zenon Martyniuk and Ryszard Warot), performed for the first time at the New Year's Eve party in Zakopane, organised by Telewizja Polska. TVP2 also acquired the rights to broadcast the "25 years of disco polo" gala, which took place on June 25, 2017, at Polonia Stadium in Warsaw. According to Nielsen Audience Measurement, the gala was viewed by 2.6 million people.

== Additional information ==
- The leaders of the Pruszków mafia and Wołomin mafia invested in the promotion of disco polo bands. At the height of the genre's success, between 1995 and 1997, criminal organizations controlled about 70 percent of the market.
- Disco Polo has been met with severe criticism from supporters of other musical genres, who have accused it of musical primitiveness, lyrical naivety, poor execution, and lack of originality (by duplicating motifs and designs, often from Polish and foreign music of the 1960s and 1970s). However, this criticism has not affected the popularity of the genre. Supporters of the genre and the bands who perform it argue that it is becoming more professional, the music and lyrics have improved, and performers are increasingly avoiding playback singing.
- At the same time, some well-known performers of the older generation took part in creating the music trend or benefited from its popularity (e.g. Janusz Laskowski, Marlena Drozdowska, Bohdan Smoleń, Andrzej Rosiewicz, Stan Tutaj, Marek Kondrat, Piotr Pręgowski, and Kabaret OT.TO).
- In the early 1990s, Krzysztof Krawczyk sang and recorded songs in the Italo disco genre, on the basis of which disco polo was created.
- In some media, the term neo-disco polo is used in relation to some artists. The creators referred to by the term themselves point out that the new disco polo has an "old-school vibe", but compared to disco polo from the 1990s, the production and arrangement of songs is better.
- In 2014, during the 51st National Polish Song Festival in Opole, the singer Maryla Rodowicz performed disco polo song covers, namely "You're crazy" and "Long live freedom" from the band Boys and Weekend's song "She dances for me".
- Basia Bulat released the song "Disco Polo" about growing up with this genre of music within her family.

== See also ==
- Eurodisco
- Italo disco
- Turbo-folk
