= Weekend (Polish band) =

- Origin: Sejny, Poland
- Genres: Disco polo, dance
- Years active: 2000–present
- Labels: Green Star, R-Weekend, Fonografika
- Members: Radosław Liszewski; Adam Łazowski; Bernard Mikulski
- Past members: Tomasz Niecikowski; Grzegorz Skowronek; Jacek Wasilewski — Paweł Nitupski
- Website: www.weekend.fm

Weekend is a Polish band. Their music is on the border of the disco polo and dance genres.

== Discography ==
=== Albums ===
Year	Title	Charts	Certification (ZPAV)
Year	Title	POL	Certification (ZPAV)
2002	Playboy: Released: 2002; Label: Green Star	—	
2004	Bawidamek: Released: 2004; Label: Green Star	—	
2009	Deja Vu: Released: 10 May 2009; Label: Green Star	—	
2010	Tak jak czuję: Released: 3 September 2010; Label: Green Star	—	
2012	Ona tańczy dla mnie (She dances for me): Released: 10 November 2012; Label: R-Weekend/Fonografika	4	Gold Disc
2013	Święta z Radkiem: Released: 31 October 2013; Label: Fonografika	—	
2014	Będziesz na zawsze: Released: 6 November 2014; Label: Edipresse	—	
"—" denotes a title that did not chart.

=== Singles ===
Year	Title	Charts		Album
Year	Title	POL Dance	POL ESKA	Album
2012	"Ona tańczy dla mnie"	15	9	Ona tańczy dla mnie
2012	"Męska rzeczywistość"	—	—	Ona tańczy dla mnie
2013	"Moje miasto nigdy nie śpi (Studio Fox Original)"	—	—	—
2013	"Moje miasto nigdy nie śpi (Remix Radio)"	—	—	—
2013	"Moje miasto nigdy nie śpi (Remix Extended)"	—	—	—
2013	"Moje miasto nigdy nie śpi (Serenity Remix Radio)"	—	—	—
"—" denotes a title that did not chart.

=== Other charted songs ===
Year	Title	Charts	Album
Year	Title	POL Dance	Album
2013	"Za każdą chwilę"	44	Ona tańczy dla mnie
