= Akcent (Polish band) =

Polish disco polo band

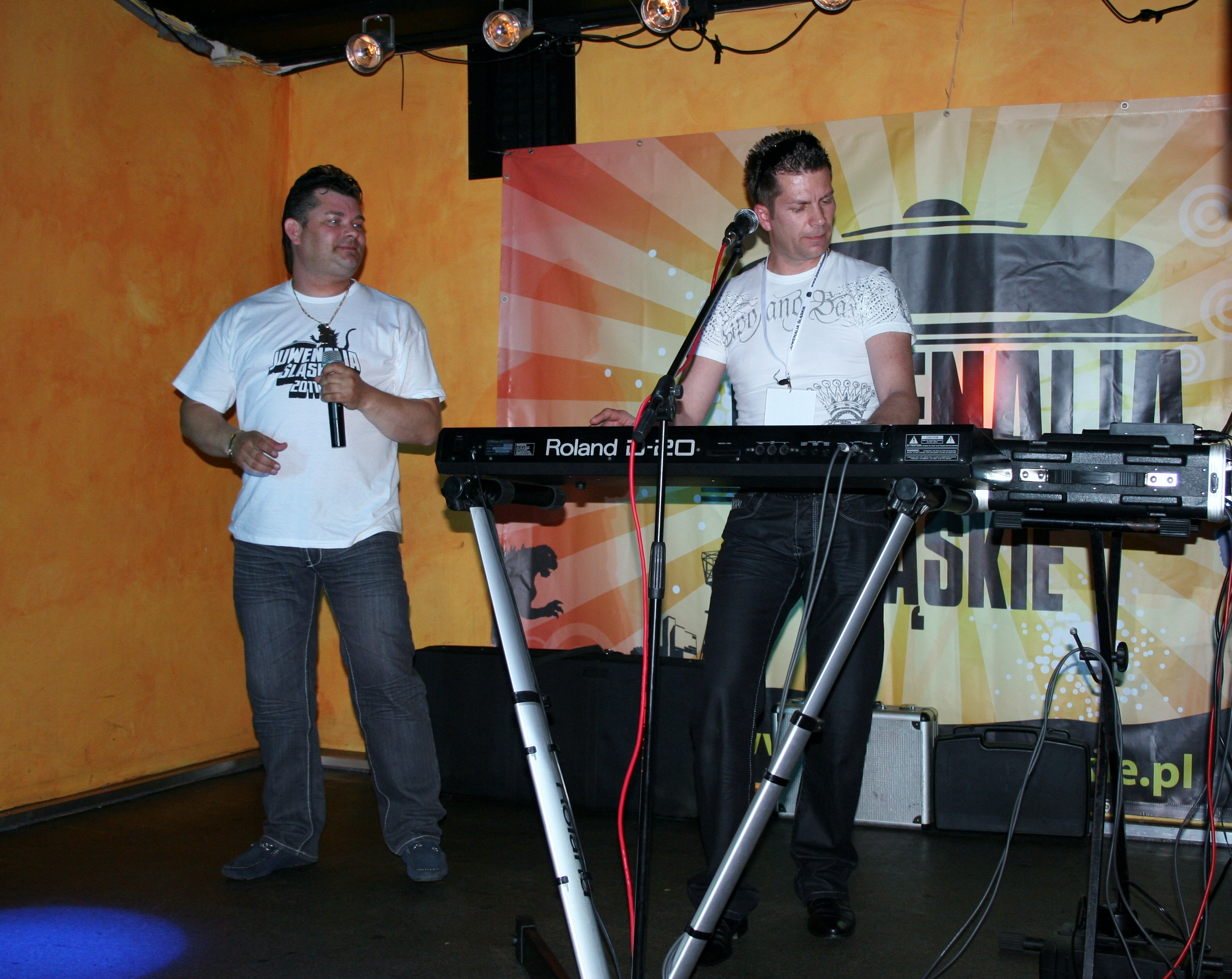
- Zenon Martyniuk and Ryszard Warot (2011)

Background information
- Origin: Bielsk Podlaski, Poland
- Genre: Disco polo
- Years active: 1989–1991; 1993–present
- Labels: Blue Star, Green Star, Omega Music
- Members: Zenon Martyniuk; Piotr Szerszenowicz; Jakub Zrajkowski; Waldemar Oksztul; Maciej Dzierski
- Past members: Mariusz Anikiej; Artur Boroń; Artur Kirpsza; Ryszard Warot; Maciej Samluk
- Website: Official website

Akcent is a Polish disco polo band formed in 1989 in Bielsk Podlaski by Zenon Martyniuk and Mariusz Anikiej. They are one of the most prominent bands in Poland's disco polo genre.

== History ==
Akcent's name derives from the band names of its founders: Akord (Zenon Martyniuk) and Centrum (Mariusz Anikiej). Their debut cassette, Akcent 1, was released in 1991, followed by a hiatus during which Martyniuk formed Ex‑Akcent and Anikiej performed with Marinero.

Upon reuniting in 1993, they released the cassettes Dajcie mi gitarę and Słuchajcie chłopcy, featuring the hit "Stary Cygan," which ended up in Radio Katowice’s Przebój Roku poll.

1994’s album Życie to są chwile included the breakout hits “Mała figlarka” and “Dźwięki strun,” which became nationwide successes and had their first music videos.

In 1995 the album Czar miłości was released; in 1996 they experimented with a dance sound on Akcent Dance, featuring tracks like “Daleko do gwiazd”. The mid-to-late 1990s saw further success with albums Oczarowałaś mnie, Akcent Gold, and Wyznanie, the latter winning the Grand Prix at the National Festival of Disco Polo and Dance in Ostróda.

A 1999 lineup change followed Anikiej's departure, with the album Wspomnienie featuring re-arranged older hits.

Their landmark hit “Przez twe oczy zielone” (2014) became an online sensation, surpassing 200 million views on YouTube and earning awards such as the Audience Award at the Ostróda Festival.

By 2016–2018, the band continued to tour heavily and release hits like “Kochana wierzę w miłość” and “Przekorny los”. In 2017, Martyniuk's biography was published, and he appeared in a major TV biopic, cementing his status as a national icon.

== Band members ==
=== Current ===
- Zenon Martyniuk – vocals (1989–present)
- Piotr Szerszenowicz – keyboards (2005–present)
- Jakub Zrajkowski – drums & keyboards (2005–present)
- Waldemar Oksztul – bass & guitars (2005–present)
- Maciej Dzierski – (2019–present)

=== Former ===
- Mariusz Anikiej (1989–1999)
- Artur Boroń (1999)
- Artur Kirpsza (1999–2002)
- Ryszard Warot (2000–2023)
- Maciej Samluk (2019–2023)

== Discography ==
- Akcent 1 (1990)
- Żegnaj mała (1991)
- Dajcie mi gitarę (1993)
- Słuchajcie chłopcy (1993)
- Peron łez (1993)
- Życie to są chwile (1994)
- Czar miłości (1995)
- Dance (1996)
- Kolędy (1996)
- Oczarowałaś mnie (1997)
- Akcent Gold (1997)
- Wyznanie (1998)
- Wspomnienie (1999)
- Moja gwiazda (2001)
- Przekorny los (2016)

== Notable songs ==
- "Przez twe oczy zielone"
- "Życie to są chwile"
- "Przekorny los"
- "Mała figlarka"
- "Dźwięki strun"
- "Królowa nocy"
- "Moja gitara"
- "Pszczółka Maja"

== Collaborations ==
- “W sercu mi graj” (with Exaited)
- “Skradłaś wszystko” (with Kroppa)
- “Moja gitara”, “Pieśń o pokoju” (with Lider)

== Awards and recognition ==
Akcent has garnered numerous awards, particularly at the National Festival of Dance Music in Ostróda. Their albums like Przekorny los (Diamond) and Diamentowa kolekcja (Gold) highlight their commercial success.
