= Beret =

Flat-topped, visorless cap

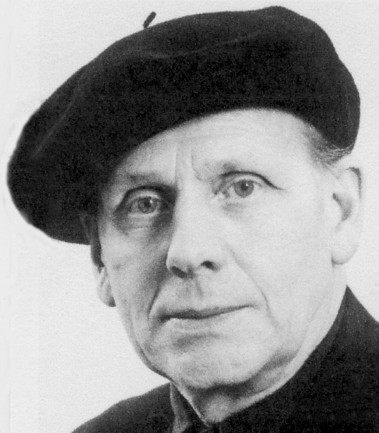
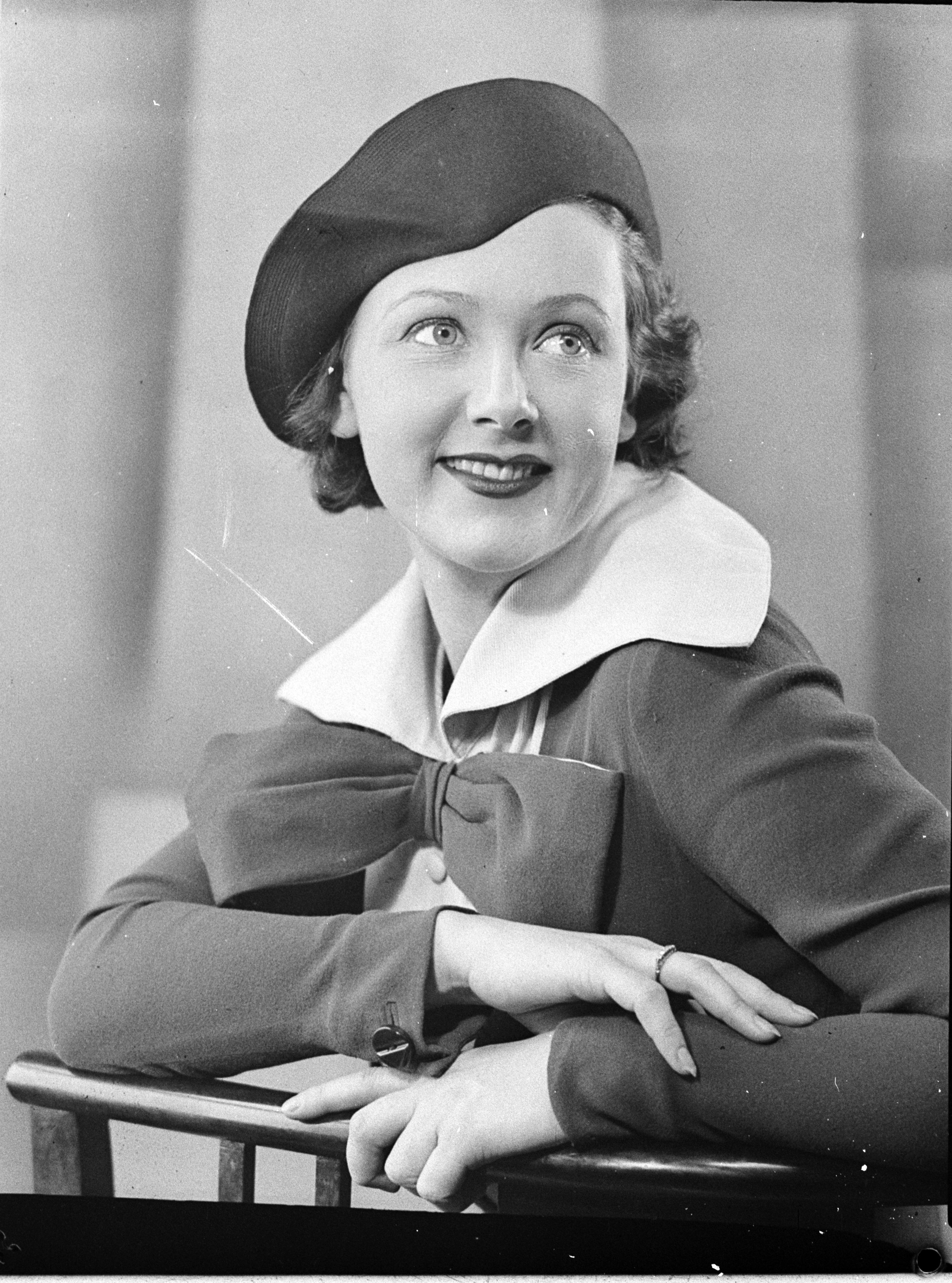
Traditional Basque-style beret with headband folded in (top); fashion model wearing a beret (bottom)

A beret (UK: /ˈbɛreɪ/ BERR-ay, US: /bəˈreɪ/ bə-RAY; French: béret [beʁɛ]; Basque: txapel [t͡ʃa.pel]; Spanish: boina [ˈbojna]) is a soft, round, flat-crowned cap made of hand-knitted wool, crocheted cotton, wool felt, or acrylic fibre.

Mass production of berets began in the 19th century specifically in the Basque Country, where they were already common headwear among the indigenous population, before spreading to Southern France and the north of Spain; as such, the beret remains associated with these countries. Berets are worn as part of the uniform of many military and police units worldwide, as well as by other organizations.

== History ==
Archaeology and art history indicate that headwear similar to the modern beret has been worn since the Bronze Age across Northern Europe and as far south as ancient Crete and Italy, where it was worn by the Minoans, Etruscans and Romans. Such headgear has been popular among the nobility and artists across Europe throughout modern history.

The 17th century Dutch artist Rembrandt was well known for wearing a beret and may have inspired the beret's association with artists.

The Basque-style beret was the traditional headwear of Aragonese and Navarrian shepherds from the Ansó and Roncal valleys of the Pyrenees, a mountain range that divides southern France from northern Spain. The commercial production of Basque-style berets began in the 17th century around Oloron-Sainte-Marie in the Béarn province of southern France. Originally a local craft, beret-making became industrialised in the 19th century. The first factory, Beatex-Laulhere, claims production records dating back to 1810. By the 1920s, berets were associated with the working classes in a part of France and Spain and by 1928 more than 20 French factories and some Spanish and Italian factories produced millions of berets.

In Western fashion, men and women have worn the beret since the 1920s as sportswear and later as a fashion statement.

Military berets were first adopted by the French Chasseurs Alpins in 1889. After seeing these during the First World War, British General Hugh Elles proposed the beret for use by the newly formed Royal Tank Regiment, which needed headgear that would stay on while climbing in and out of the small hatches of tanks. They were approved for use by King George V in 1924. Traditional French and Basque berets are made of felted wool, making them not only warm and windproof, but also waterproof. Another possible origin of the RTR beret is that it was suggested to Alec Gatehouse by Eric Dorman-Smith. While the two officers were serving at Sandhurst in 1924, Gatehouse, who had transferred to the Royal Tank Corps, had been given the task of designing a practical headgear for the new corps. Dorman-Smith had toured Spain, including the Basque region, with his friend Ernest Hemingway during the past few years, and had acquired a black Basque beret during his travels.

The specifications were that it had to protect men's hair from the oil in a tank but not take up space in the cramped interior, and he led Gatehouse straight to his room. Hanging on the wall was his Basque beret from Pamplona. He tossed it across, and Gatehouse gingerly tried it on. The beret design was adopted...

The black RTR beret was made famous by Field Marshal Montgomery in the Second World War.

== Wear ==
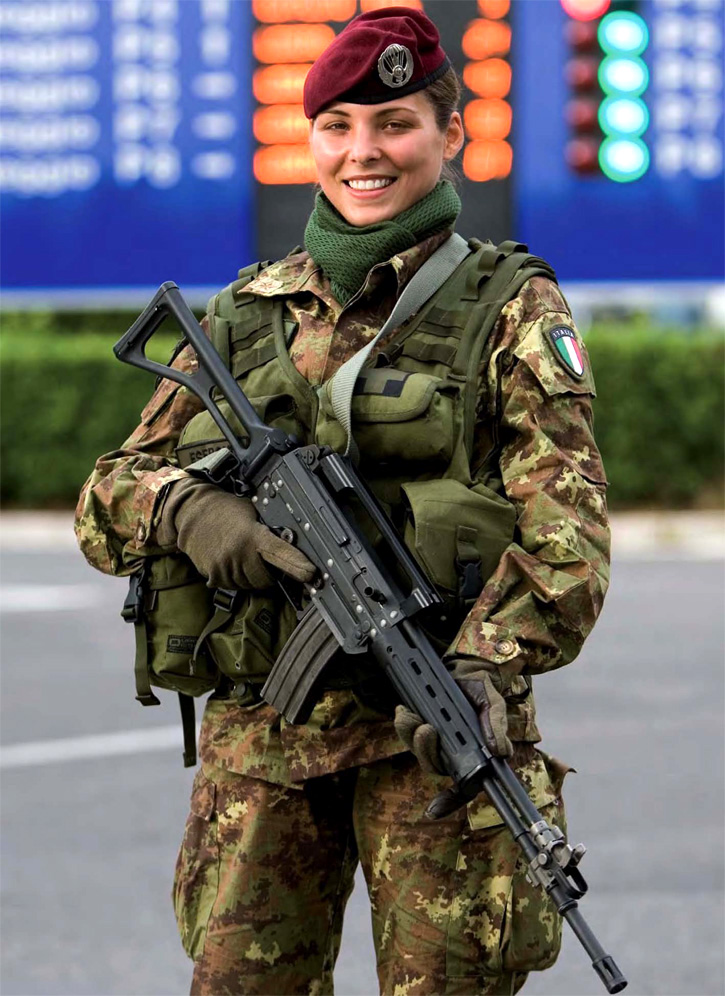
A soldier of the Italian Folgore Brigade wearing a beret.

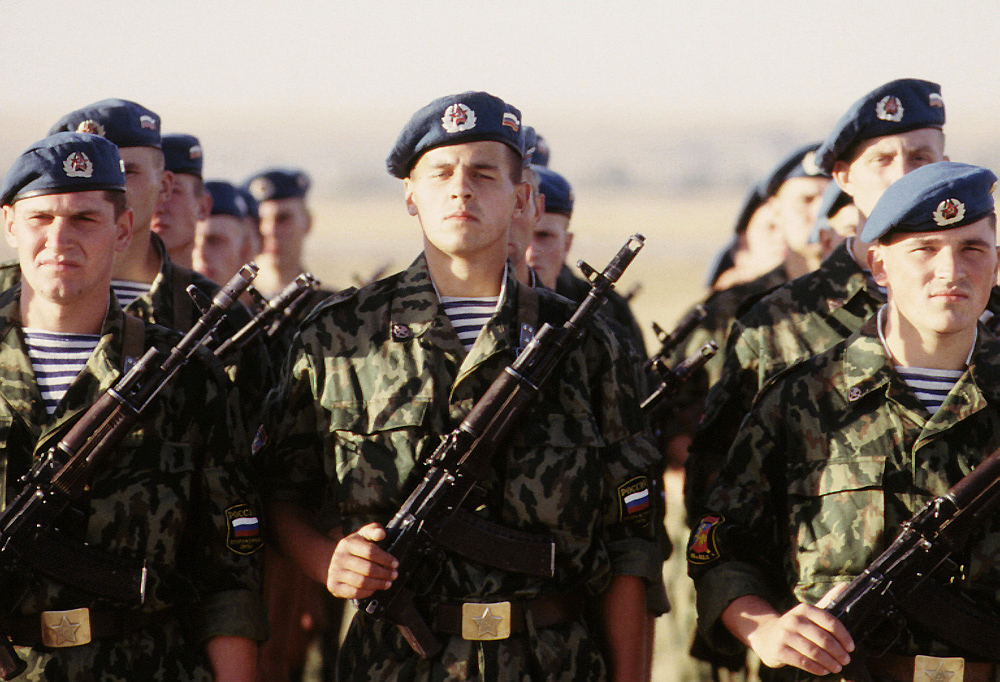
Russian VDV Paratroopers of the 106th Guards Airborne Division doing an excersise at Kazakhstan, 1999

The beret fits snugly around the head, and can be "shaped" in a variety of ways – in the Americas it is commonly worn pushed to one side. In Central and South America, local custom usually prescribes the manner of wearing the beret; there is no universal rule and older gentlemen usually wear it squared on the head, jutting forward. It can be worn by both men and women.

Military uniform berets feature a headband or sweatband attached to the wool, made either from leather, silk or cotton ribbon, sometimes with a drawstring allowing the wearer to tighten the cap. The drawstrings are, according to custom, either tied and cut off or tucked in or else left to dangle. The beret is often adorned with a cap badge, either in cloth or metal. Some berets have a piece of buckram or other stiffener in the position where the badge is intended to be worn.

Berets are not usually lined, but many are partially lined with silk or satin. In military berets, the headband is worn on the outside; military berets often have external sweatbands of leather, pleather or ribbon. The traditional beret (also worn by selected military units, such as the Belgian Chasseurs Ardennais or the French Chasseurs Alpins), usually has the "sweatband" folded inwardly. In such a case, these berets have only an additional inch or so of the same woollen material designed to be folded inwardly. Newer beret styles made of Polar fleece are also popular.

== National traditions and variants ==
=== Basque Country ===
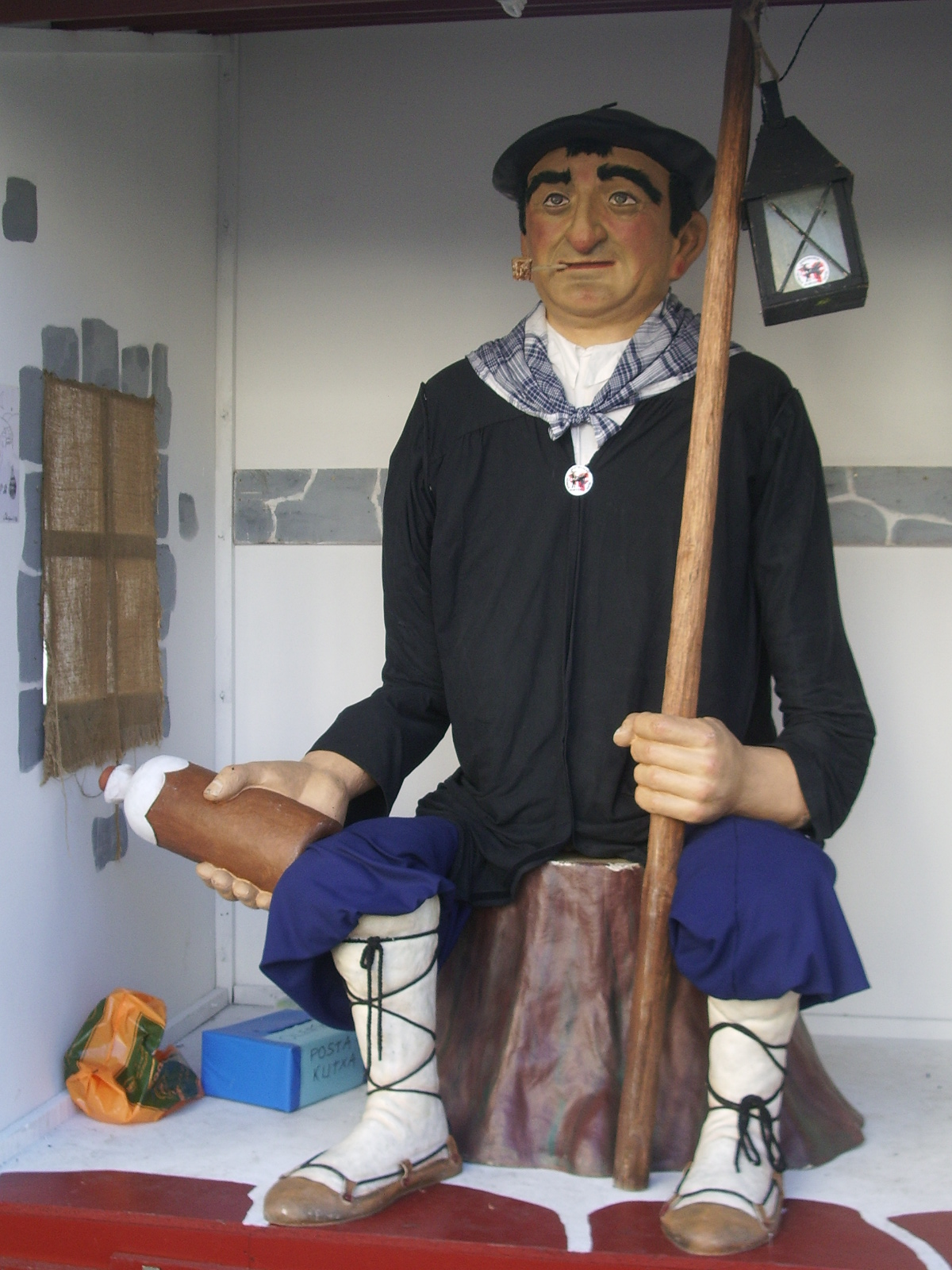
Olentzero, a Basque Christmas figure, wears a beret

Berets came to be popularised across Europe and other parts of the world as typical Basque headgear, as reflected in their name in several languages (e.g. béret basque in French; Baskenmütze in German; Basco in Italian; Tascu/Birritta in Sicilian; or baskeri in Finnish), while the Basques themselves use the words txapela or boneta. They are very popular and common in the Basque Country. The colours adopted for folk costumes varied by region and purpose: black and blue are worn more frequently than red and white, which are usually used at local festivities. The people of Aragon and the Basque country adopted red berets while the black beret became the common headgear of workers in both Spain and France.

A big commemorative black beret is the usual trophy in sport or bertso competitions, including Basque rural sports, the Basque portions of the Tour de France, and the Vuelta Ciclista al Pais Vasco. It may bear sewn ornamental references to the achievement or contest.

=== France ===
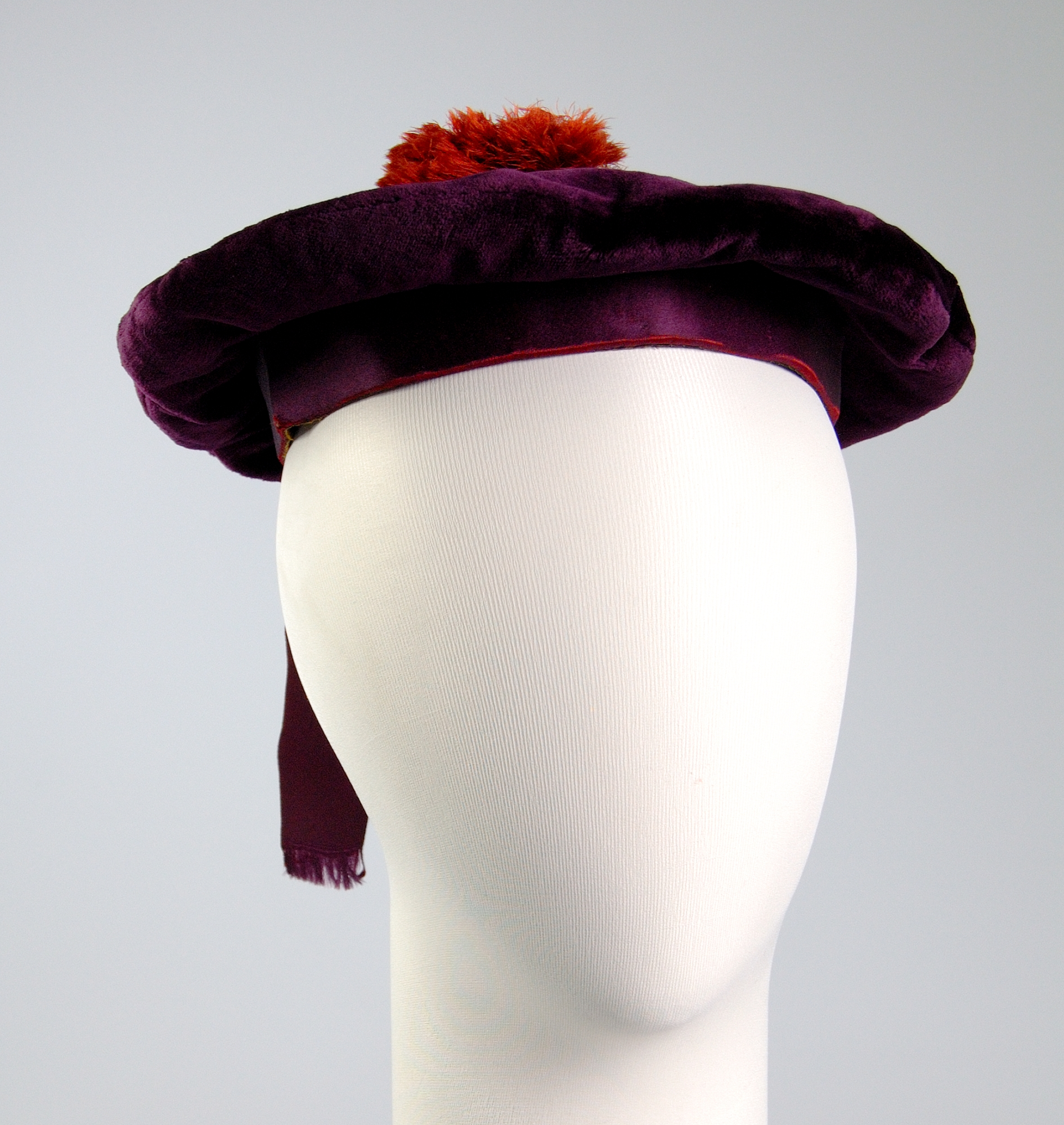
Beret, 1884

The black beret was once considered the national cap of France in Anglo-Saxon countries and is part of the stereotypical image of the Onion Johnny. It is no longer as widely worn as it once was, but it remains a strong sign of local identity in the southwest of France. When French people want to picture themselves as "the typical average Frenchman" in France or in a foreign country, they often use this stereotype from Anglo-Saxon countries. (Note: In the movie Crazy for Love, shot after WWII in Normandy, the hero wears a cap at the beginning of the movie, but then he changes for a beret, to look "more French". Later a lady is looking for him in the village and asks everybody "Have you seen somebody wearing a beret passing by...?") Today, there are three manufacturers in France. Laulhère (who acquired the formerly oldest manufacturer, Blancq-Olibet, in February 2014) has been making bérets since 1840. The beret still remains a strong symbol of the unique identity of southwestern France and is worn while celebrating traditional events.

=== Spain ===
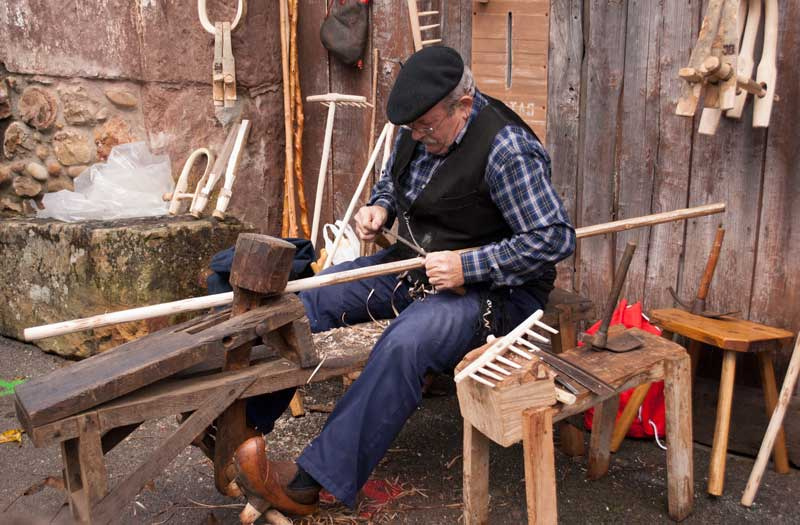
A Cantabrian craftsman wearing a boina

In Spain, the beret is usually known as the boina, sometimes also as bilbaína or bilba. They were once common men's headwear across the north and central areas of the country. The first areas to wear it were the Basque Country, Navarre, Aragon and Castile, but its use spread over rest of Spain during the 19th century.

In the 20th century, the beret became part of a common stereotype of rural people, often with negative connotations of boorishness and uncouthness, found in expressions such as "paleto de boina a rosca" ("a hick wearing a screwed-on beret"), which has greatly reduced the popularity of the beret in Spain.

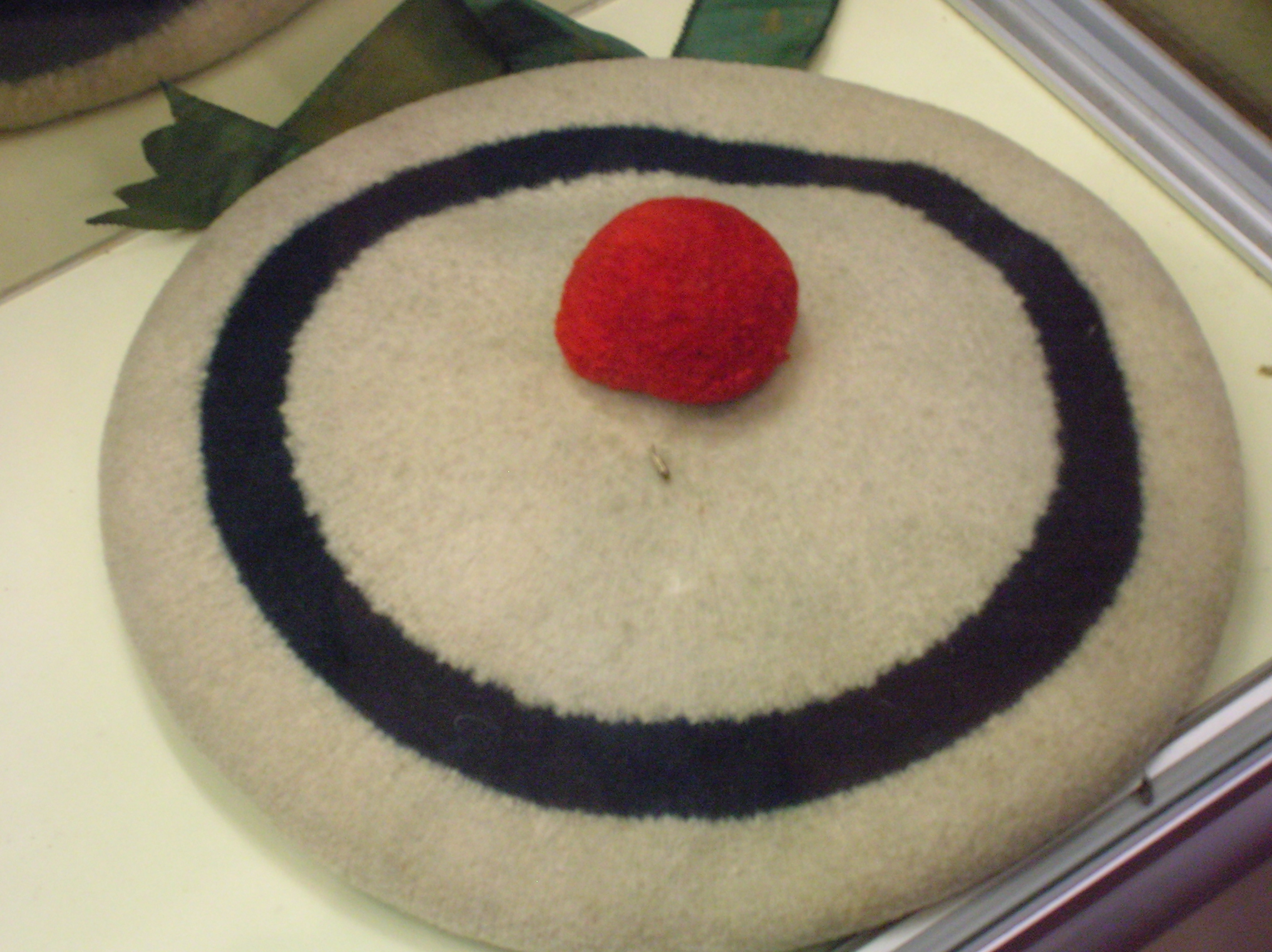
The traditional bonnet of the Kilwinning Archers of Scotland

=== Scotland ===
There are several traditional Scottish variants of the beret, notably the Scottish bonnet or Bluebonnet (originally bonaid in Gaelic), whose ribbon cockade and feathers identify the wearer's clan and rank. Other Scottish types include the tam-o'-shanter (named after a Robert Burns' character in one of his poems) and the striped Kilmarnock cap, both of which feature a large pompom in the centre.

== Uses ==
=== As uniform headwear ===
The beret's practicality has long made it an item of military, police and other uniform clothing.

Among a few well-known historic examples are the Scottish soldiers, who wore the blue bonnet in the 17th and 18th centuries, the Volontaires Cantabres, a French force raised in the Basque country in the 1740s to the 1760s, who also wore a blue beret, and the Carlist rebels, with their red berets, in 1830s Spain.

The French Chasseurs alpins, a corps of mountain troops created in 1888, were the first permanently established military force to wear the military beret as a standard headgear. As retained until the present day the chasseur beret is a large and somewhat floppy headdress. The Commandos de Chasse worn an unusual bi-colored beret.

In the 20th century, royal approval was given for the Royal Tank Corps to adopt the black beret in 1924, with the 11th Hussars adopting a brown beret in 1928. In World War II, the Royal Dragoons adopted the grey beret at the end of 1939, with other mechanised units of the British Army, such as the Royal Armoured Corps and the Guards Armoured Division, adopting the black beret in 1941. British officer Bernard Montgomery ("Monty") took to wearing a black beret given to him by the driver of his command vehicle in 1942, and it became his trademark.

The maroon beret (not to be confused with the red beret), was officially introduced in July 1942 at the direction of Major-General Frederick Browning, commander of the British 1st Airborne Division, and soon became an international symbol of airborne forces. In the 1950s the U.S. Army's newly conceived special forces units began to wear a green beret as headgear, following the custom of the British Royal Marines, which was officially adopted in 1961 with such units becoming known as the "Green Berets", and additional specialized forces in the Army, U.S. Air Force and other services also adopted berets as distinctive headgear.

=== In fashion and culture ===
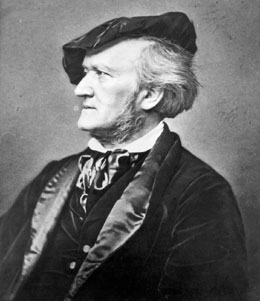
Photograph of Richard Wagner in his beret

The beret is part of the long-standing stereotype of the intellectual, film director, artist, "hipster", poet, bohemian and beatnik. The painter Rembrandt and the composer Richard Wagner, among others, wore berets. In the United States and Britain, the middle of the 20th century saw an explosion of berets in women's fashion. In the latter part of the 20th century, the beret was adopted by the Chinese both as a fashion statement and for its political undertones. Berets were also worn by bebop and jazz musicians like Dizzy Gillespie, Gene Krupa, Wardell Gray and Thelonious Monk.

=== As a revolutionary symbol ===
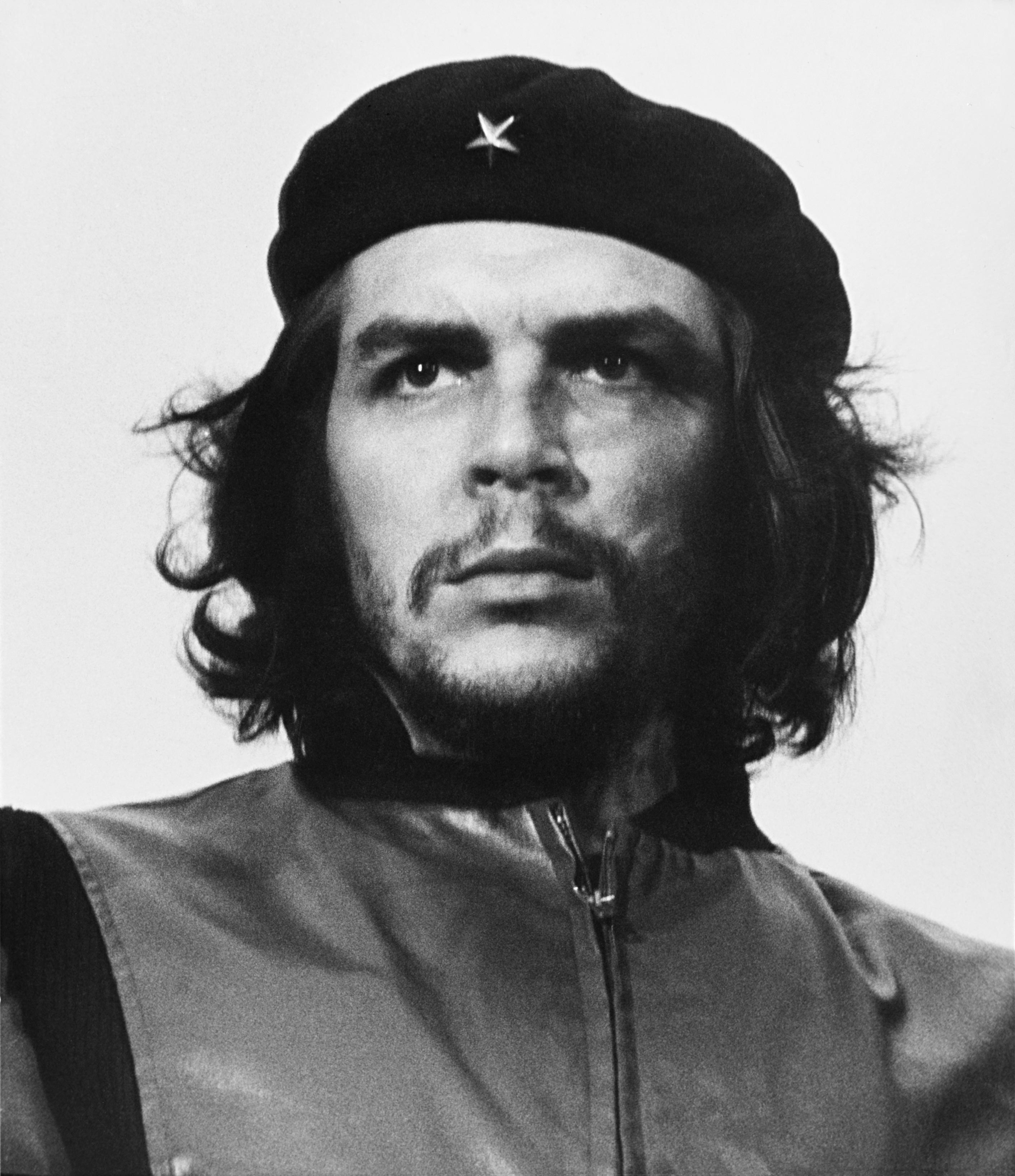
The Guerrillero Heroico portrait of Che Guevara

Guerrillero Heroico, an iconic photograph of the Argentine revolutionary Che Guevara, shows him wearing a black beret with a brass star.

In the 1960s several activist groups adopted the black beret. These include the Provisional Irish Republican Army (PIRA), the ETA (who wore black berets over hoods in public appearances), the Black Panther Party of the United States, formed in 1966, and the "Black Beret Cadre" (a similar Black Power organisation in Bermuda). In addition, the Brown Berets were a Chicano organisation formed in 1967.

The Young Lords Party, a Latino revolutionary organisation in the United States in the 1960s and 1970s, also wore berets, as did the Guardian Angels unarmed anti-crime citizen patrol units originated by Curtis Sliwa in New York City in the 1970s to patrol the streets and subways to discourage crime (red berets and matching shirts).

=== Rastafarians ===
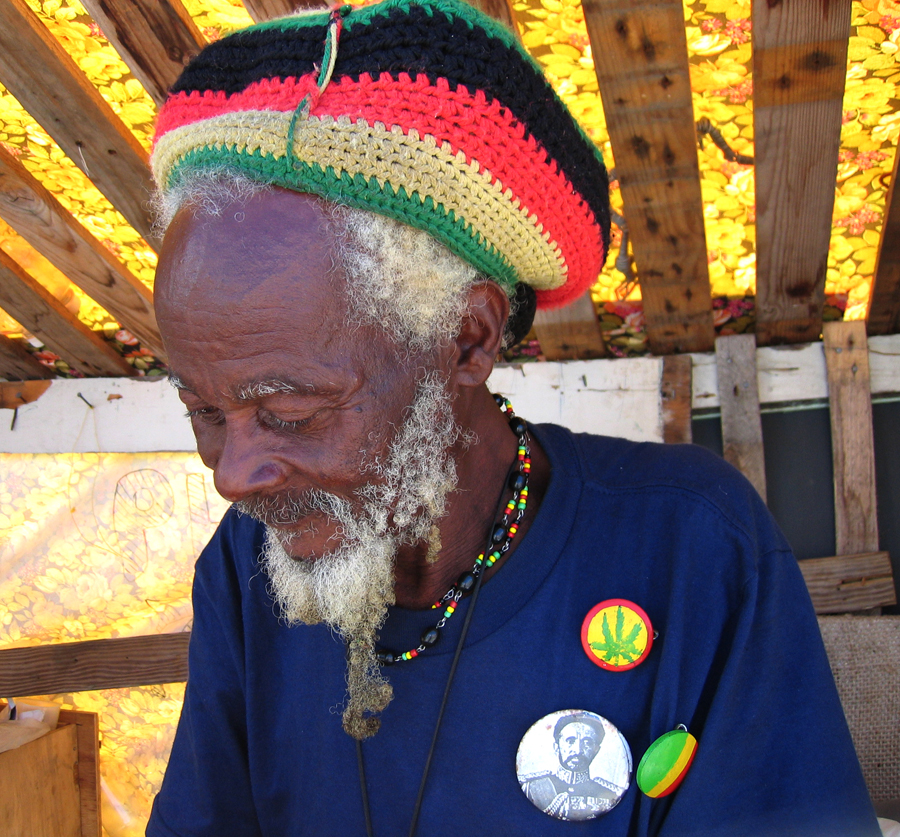
Rastafarian with beret

Adherents of the Rastafari movement often wear a very large knitted or crocheted black beret with red, gold and green circles atop their dreadlocks. The style is often erroneously called a kufi, after the skullcap known as kufune. They consider the beret and dreadlocks to be symbols of the biblical covenant of God with his chosen people, the "black Israelites". This style of hat is also known as a Rastacap.

== See also ==
- List of hat styles
- Biretta, a similarly named but completely different cap
- Barretina
- Caubeen
- Flat cap
- Military berets by color:
  - Black beret,
  - Blue beret,
  - Green beret,
  - Maroon beret,
  - Red beret,
  - Tan beret
- Mohair berets
- Pakol
- Tam (women's hat)
- Tudor bonnet
- Zucchetto
