= Polo TV =

Music-oriented Polish TV station

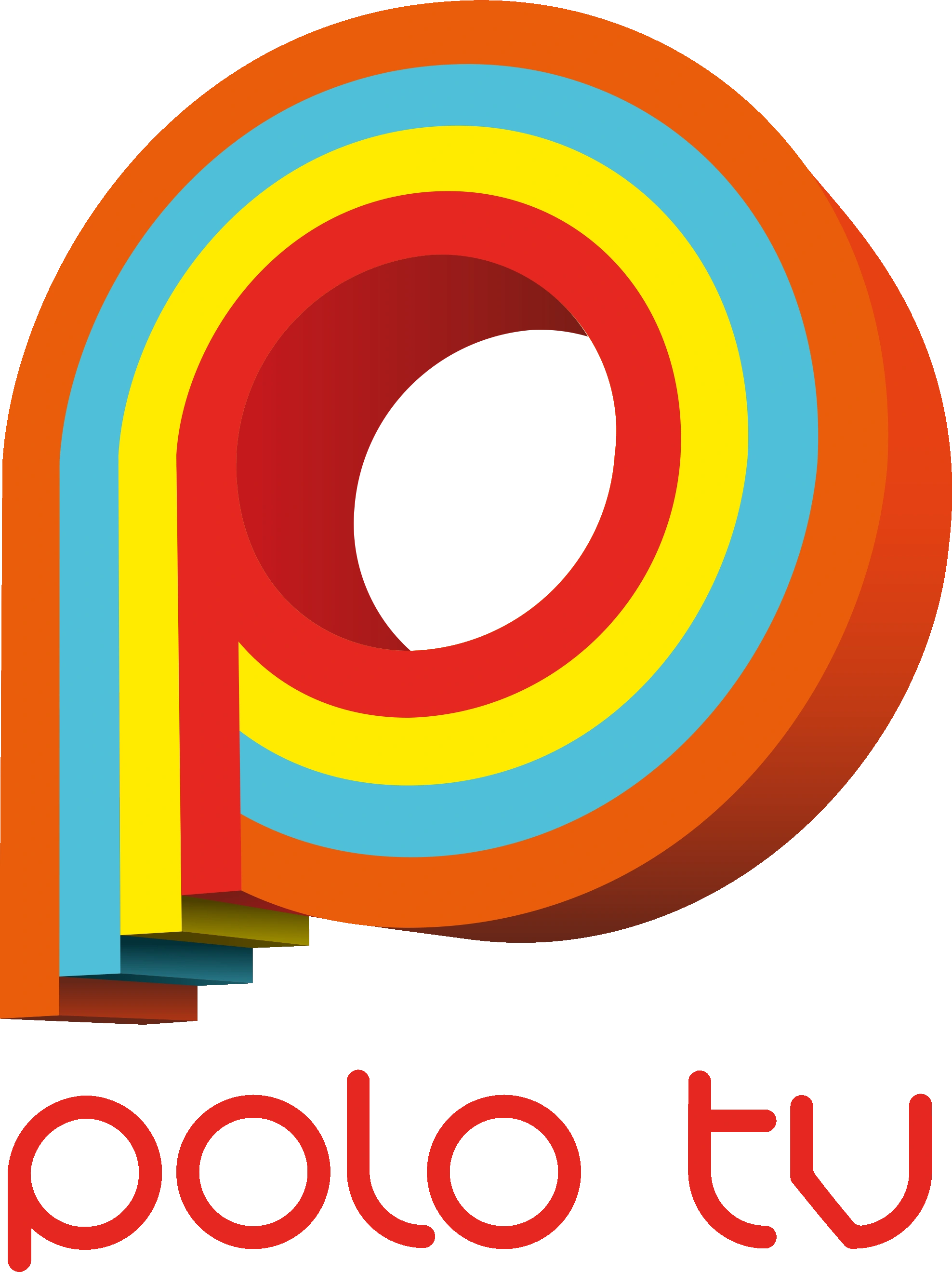
- Country: Poland
- Headquarters: 04-175 Warsaw; Ostrobramska st. 77, Poland

Programming
- Language: Polish
- Picture format: 576i (16:9 SDTV) (2011-2019); 1080i (HDTV) (Since 2019)

Ownership
- Owner: Grupa Polsat Plus (since 2017)
- Sister channels: Disco Polo Music

History
- Founded: 11 April 2011; 15 years ago
- Launched: 7 May 2011; 15 years ago

Links
- Website: polotv.pl

Availability

Terrestrial
- Polish Digital: MUX 1 (Channel 14) (SD)

Polo TV is a Polish-language television channel, focusing mainly on music programming. Its owner is Telewizja Polsat. The station mainly plays disco polo and dance as well as folk, country, romani, muzyka biesiadna (lit. 'festive music') and foreign disco music. Aside from music broadcasting, the station also airs entertainment programmes and coverage of music events.

== History ==
The online test broadcast of the channel started on 11 April 2011 and the official launch took place on 7 May 2011. From the beginning of broadcasting until 4 December 2019, the channel was free-to-air on satellite. Initially, the station broadcast only festive and disco polo music and to a lesser extent folk, country and romani music. It was not until spring 2012 that it began broadcasting programmes dedicated to dance music and foreign disco music. On 24 December 2011, it reached the highest viewership among music stations in the commercial 16-49 group. From September to December 2011, the station was the second most-watched Polish music station.

In July 2012, Polo TV became the most watched music TV station in Poland. It also reached that status in July 2013, when the station's programming took the top ten places among the most watched, with Disco Hit Festival – Kobylnica reaching the highest viewership of 219,000. On October 1, 2013, Polo TV began airing the TVP show Święta Wojna, which was the first non-music piece of programming aired on the channel. In September 2014 Polo TV produced their first original show, Miłość w rytmie disco.

As a result of a deal with ZPR Media, On December 4, 2017, Telewizja Polsat acquired 100% of shares in Lemon Records (the broadcaster of the station) becoming its owner.

On October 11, 2019, the station started airing in HD. The station was encoded and therefore taken off free-to-air satellite on December 4, 2019.

On May 6, 2021, for the 10th anniversary of the station, a new special programme: 10 lat Polo TV: Edyta i Maciek was launched and 10 celebratory concerts were held and transmitted by the station.

=== Terrestrial Broadcasting ===
The channel entered the competition for a place in the first multiplex of digital terrestrial television. On 26 April 2011, the National Broadcasting Council resolved the competition, in which the concession for terrestrial broadcasting was awarded to Kino Polska and 3 other stations. After Kino Polska withdrew from its place in the multiplex, the National Broadcasting Council awarded the concession to Polo TV. Multiplex 1 was launched on 15 December 2011, and Polo TV has been broadcasting terrestrially since 19 December 2011.

== Current Programming ==
The following is a list of Polo TV's programming:

- Chłopaki do Wzięcia
- Disco Duety
- Disco Relax
- Disco Nie Śpi
- Disco Polo Live
- Disco Polo Mix
- Disco Star
- Disco weekend z Blondi
- Folkowe Love
- Hit za hitem
- Imprezowe Sztosy
- Kochamy lata 90.
- Koncertowa niedziela
- Koncertowe Love
- Łączy nas muzyka
- Moje Disco Moje Wszystko
- Muzyczna podróż z Teresą Werner
- Muzyczna przeglądarka
- Nie ma cwaniaka na discopolaka
- Nówki
- Polskie szlagiery
- Prawy do lewego
- Święta z Polo TV
- Top 10 Lista Przebojów
- Tylko Dance
- Weselne przeboje
- Zdrady

== Logo ==
Logo	Description	Date of use	Reference
	A big red letter P created from several arcs in a single stroke, the name of the station is written below it. Appears translucent on the screen.	May 7, 2011 - May 26, 2012	
	Icon in rainbow colours. Smaller and more mobile than the previous one. Polo TV subtitle unchanged. Has a horizontal variant where the icon serves as the letter P.	May 26, 2012 – January 10, 2016	
	Icon presented in 3D, slightly tilted. Subtitle unchanged.	January 11, 2016 – Today	
