= Sławomir Skręta =

- Origin: Poland
- Genres: Disco polo
- Occupation: Record label owner
- Labels: Blue Star

Sławomir Skręta is the owner of the Polish record label Blue Star, known for releasing domestic dance music known as disco polo. He, his label and its artists are featured in the Polish documentary on disco polo, Bara Bara, by filmmaker Maria Zmarz-Koczanowicz.

The original name of the genre, muzyka chodnikowa (“sidewalk music”), that referred to cassettes sales from temporary stands on the sidewalks, was changed to the “nobler-sounding” disco polo as a reference to Italo-disco. The changing of the name was an inspiration from Sławomir Skręta, the owner of Blue Star, the first label established to record such music.
