= Kabaret OT.TO =

Polish comedy music group

Kabaret OT.TO is a Polish comedy music group founded in 1987 by Wiesław Tupaczewski. The group officially started on 1 January 1990, with a line-up consisting of Ryszard Makowski, Andrzej Piekarczyk, Andrzej Tomanek and Tupaczewski.

OT.TO is one of the first Polish comedy groups to explore themes other than the political realms of the absurd. Their best known songs are: "Zasmażka", "Wakacje", and "To już lato". The group enjoyed its greatest popularity from the early 1990s to the early 2000s. Tupaczewski created the group's name and stage dressing, while the logo – a razor blade – was designed by Jacek Sasin, a friend of the group.

== Discography ==
- 1992 – Faux-Pas
- 1992 – Lato z z OT.TO
- 1993 – Koncert Kabaretu OT.TO z orkiestrą Zbigniewa Górnego
- 1993 – OT.TO dzieciom
- 1994 – 50-lecie Kabaretu OT.TO
- 1995 – Wesele Hamleta
- 1997 – 7777
- 1998 – Umciaciarumcia
- 2000 – Dzieła Wybrane
- 2002 – Czego.../Los Piernikos

=== Gold and platinum discs ===
==== Gold discs ====
- 1997 – Lato z OT.TO
- 1999 – 50-lecie Kabaretu OT.TO
- 1999 – Wesele Hamleta

==== Platinum discs ====
- 1999 – Faux-Pas
- 1999 – Koncert Kabaretu OT.TO z orkiestrą Zbigniewa Górnego
