= Timeline of UKTV =

This is a timeline of UKTV, a television company that broadcasts seven television channels in the United Kingdom.

== 1990s ==
- 1992
  - 1 November – UK Gold launches as a 50/50 joint venture between BBC Enterprises and Thames Television, showing programmes from the BBC and Thames archives. Thames gets involved after it lost its ITV franchise the previous year.
- 1993
  - Tele-Communications Inc. takes a stake in UK Gold.
  - 1 September
    - Sky Multichannels launches, resulting in UK Gold becoming encrypted.
    - UK Living launches, as a joint venture between Thames, Tele-Communications and Cox Enterprises.
  - 21 December – Flextech announces to purchase TCI's stake in UK Gold and UK Living.
- 1994
  - January – TCI acquires a 60.4% stake in Flextech. This gives the company a 25% stake in UK Gold and UK Living.
- 1995
  - No events.
- 1996
  - 14 August – Flextech announces its purchase of Cox and Pearson/Thames' stakes in UK Gold and UK Living, gaining full control over the latter and retaining BBC's 50% stake in the former.
  - 1 October – Flextech and the BBC hold talks about a partnership to launch a new range of channels. Rival company BSkyB also holds talks with the corporation but the BBC is against BSkyB's involvement.
- 1997
  - 4 March – The BBC and Flextech agree on a deal to launch a series of BBC-branded channels. BBC Showcase, for entertainment; BBC Horizon, for documentaries; BBC Style, for lifestyle; BBC Learning, for schools, and BBC Arena, for the arts plus three other channels: BBC Catch-Up, for repeats of popular programmes within days of their original transmission, a dedicated BBC Sport channel and a TV version of Radio 1. After conflicts over advertising, the UKTV partnership was transitioned over to BBC Worldwide. BBC themselves kept the BBC Showcase/Catch-Up and BBC Learning concepts, and launched them in 1998 and 1999 as BBC Choice and BBC Knowledge respectively, while the UKTV networks would be named after UK Gold, and named UK Horizons, UK Style and UK Arena respectively.
  - 27 October – UK Living is renamed as Living, after it was decided that the channel would not be part of the UKTV network.
  - 1 November – UK Horizons, UK Style and UK Arena launch on Astra satellite and analogue cable, on the fifth anniversary of UK Gold's launch. On satellite, the new networks share a single transponder, with each channel broadcasting at certain times of the day.
- 1998
  - 1 October
    - Sky Digital launches, which allowes for UK Horizons and UK Style to broadcast full time, with UK Arena airing during the evenings, from 7pm to 7am.
    - An offshoot spin-off to UK Gold, UK Gold Classics, launches as the first digital-only UKTV channel, showcasing older programmes with UK Gold airing newer programmes. However, it only aired as a part-time service, broadcasting from Friday to Sunday between 6pm to 2am.
  - 10 October – UK Play launches. This is the proposed TV version of Radio 1, but launches without any formal ties to the station.
  - 15 November – OnDigital launches. UK Play and UK Gold have their own full-time slot, with UK Horizons and UK Style timesharing. UK Arena is not available on that platform.
- 1999
  - 2 April – UK Gold Classics relaunches as UK Gold 2, transitioning to becoming a secondary timeshift service of its parent network, airing the morning programmes during the evening.
  - UK Play is added to Astra satellite as a filler network within UK Horizons' overnight downtime. UK Style and UK Arena also move transponders.

== 2000s ==
- 2000
  - 31 March – After low viewing figures, UK Arena is relaunched as UK Drama, transitioning to dramas full time, although it remains a part-time network.
  - 27 November – UK Play is renamed as Play UK, to differentiate it from UKTV's other networks and is the first to use the then-new UKTV logo in its branding.
- 2001
  - 30 March – The UKTV channels are removed from Astra satellite as part of Sky Analogue's closedown phase.
  - 8 May
    - The new UKTV logo expands to the other networks, which gains new ident packages.
    - UK Horizons +1 Hour launches on Sky, becoming the first timeshift service in the UKTV network.
  - 11 July
    - UK Style and UK Horizons split on OnDigital, no longer timesharing with each other.
    - UKTV announces the launch of UK Food, the first offshoot network of UK Style in November. The channel's launch was due to an increasing addition of more lifestyle programmes on UK Style.
  - 5 November – UK Food launches on Sky Digital and Telewest Active Digital, airing from 7am to 7pm and timesharing with UK Drama.
- 2002
  - 11 February – UKTV's second timeshift service: UK Style + launches on Sky Digital. The channel is broadcast from 8am to 6pm, timesharing with UK Gold 2.
  - 15 February – UK Style + and UK Horizons +1 launch on Telewest Active Digital, timesharing with each other.
  - 1 May – ITV Digital stops broadcasting, resulting in UKTV's channels disappearing from terrestrial television.
  - 29 May – UK Gold 2, UK Food, UK Horizons +1 and UK Style + launch on NTL Home Digital.
  - 11 June – UKTV announces the closure of Play UK at the end of the year, due to poor viewing figures and the closure of ITV Digital. Most of its programmes would move over to UK Gold.
  - 30 June – UKTV announces the launch of its third timeshift service UK Gold +1, for launch in August.
  - 1 August – UK Gold +1 launches on Sky Digital, airing from 7pm to 7am.
  - 13 September
    - UKTV announces that Play UK's closure will be moved forward to the end of the month.
    - UKTV announces that a new offshoot network of UK Horizons – UK History, would take over the former Play UK bandwidth to prepare for the launch of Freeview.
  - 30 September – Play UK closes.
  - 3 October – UKTV announces the launch of their second free-to-air service on Freeview, UK HomeStyle, a highlight/showcase network that offers the best of UK Style and UK Food's content (later including UKTV Style Gardens' content upon its own launch in 2005) for Freeview viewers.
  - 30 October – UK History launches as part of Freeview's launch window.
  - 12 December – UKTV announces that its planned UK HomeStyle service for Freeview would be named "UK Bright Ideas" due to copyright issues with the "Home" trademark. Another planned name, "UK Homes", was also rejected for the same reason.
- 2003
  - 10 January – UK Food extends its broadcast hours, now airing from 5am to 9pm, with UK Drama airing at 9pm to 5am within the rest of the slot.
  - 15 January – UK Bright Ideas launches on Freeview, alongside Sky Digital and Telewest Active Digital. It is also available on Sky Digital and Telewest Active Digital.
  - 29 January – UK Bright Ideas launches on NTL.
  - 7 July – UK Style + extends its broadcast hours to end at 2am.
  - 28 October – UKTV announces that UK Gold 2 would be reformatted and revamped into the younger and edgier UK G² on 12 November. It would feature the younger-skewing youth-oriented programmes that UK Gold already aired, alongside programmes from the closed Play UK.
  - 12 November
    - UK Gold 2 relaunches as UK G². Its broadcast hours are changed from 8pm to 3am.
    - UK Gold +1 becomes a full time service.
    - UK Food +1 launches, airing from 7am to 7pm.
- 2004
  - 28 January – UK History +1 launches on Sky.
  - 3 February
    - UKTV announces that all the channels will gain the "UKTV" prefix instead of "UK" on 8 March.
    - UKTV announces the closure of UK Horizons, which would be split into two new channels, UKTV Documentary and UKTV People on the same day.
  - 4 February – UK History +1 and UK Food +1 launch on Telewest.
  - 8 March
    - The UKTV prefix is added to all channels, e.g. UK Gold becomes UKTV Gold.
    - UK Horizons closes and splits up.
      - UKTV Documentary takes over the former UK Horizons slot on all platforms, while timeshift service UKTV Documentary +1 takes over the UK Horizons +1 timeshift service on Sky Digital and Telewest Active Digital.
      - UKTV People, the other network formed as part of the split, launches as a standalone channel on Sky Digital and Telewest Active Digital and replaces UK Horizons +1 on NTL Home Digital. It broadcasts from 7pm to 4am, timesharing with UKTV Food +1.
    - Following a reduction the previous month in the length of its ad breaks in a bid to retain viewers and attract advertisers after results of its research show that shorter breaks produce higher advertising recall levels, UKTV limits its junctions from seven and a half minutes to a maximum of five minutes.
  - 31 March – A new digital terrestrial pay service, Top Up TV, launches and three of UKTV's channels, UKTV Gold, UKTV Style and UKTV Food form part of the service of ten channels, each broadcasting on a part-time basis.
  - 1 July – UKTV People extends its broadcast hours to the daytime, now broadcasting from 7am to 3am.
  - 1 November – UKTV G2 +1 launches on Sky Digital and Telewest Active Digital, broadcasting from 9pm to 4am.
- 2005
  - 12 January – UKTV People +1 launches exclusively on Sky Digital.
  - 23 February – UKTV Style Gardens launches on Sky and Telewest Digital as the gardening offshoot from UKTV Style.
  - 1/30 May – UKTV Drama expands its hours.
  - 7 October – UKTV announces a "UKTV Sport" strand to air on UKTV G2, which would also lead with the launch of a planned channel (that never came into fruition).
  - 13 October – UKTV Style Gardens launches on NTL Digital.
- 2006
  - 16 January – UKTV G2 expands its broadcast hours to the daytime to coincide with the launch of the UKTV Sport strand.
  - 28 February – UKTV Food +1 extends its broadcast hours to include the evening.
  - 30 March – UKTV G2 +1 launches on NTL.
  - 18 April – UKTV People +1 closes and is removed from the Sky EPG.
  - 2 May – UKTV Drama +1 launches in the bandwidth formerly home to UKTV People +1. It is broadcast from 3pm to 2am.
  - 2006 sees UKTV G2 show highlights of the RBS Six Nations rugby union championship, extensive coverage of the 2006 FIFA World Cup as a sub-licensing of the BBC's rights to the tournament, and basketball, including the quarter-finals of the EuroLeague. and the 2006 FIBA World Championship.
- 2007
  - 5 February – UKTV Style Gardens is renamed UKTV Gardens.
  - 18 September – UKTV History +1, UKTV Documentary +1 and UKTV Food +1 launch on Virgin Media in the ex-NTL areas.
  - 14 October – UKTV Bright Ideas closes due to low ratings.
  - 15 October
    - Dave launches as "the home of witty banter", which replaces UKTV G2. The channel also launches on Freeview.
    - UKTV History moves into the vacated UKTV Bright Ideas space on Freeview to allow Dave to take the 24-hour slot.
  - 23 October – UKTV Drama +1 launches on Virgin Media.
  - 14 December – UKTV Style +2 launches on Sky, this was essentially used as a filler network for UKTV to keep the slot for future use.
- 2008
  - 31 January – UKTV begins transmitting its channels in the 16:9 widescreen ratio, though some content initially remains in the older 4:3 format.
  - 11 June – UKTV announces that, following the successful launch of Dave, it will rebrand all of its channels from generic, UKTV-prefixed names to individual and separate brands.
  - 15 September – UKTV Style +2 closes to make way for Watch.
  - 7 October
    - Watch launches as UKTV's flagship entertainment channel, which replaces UKTV Style +2.
    - UKTV Drama rebrands as the crime-oriented Alibi.
    - UKTV Gold rebrands as the comedy-oriented G.O.L.D., standing for "Go On Laugh Daily".
    - In order to make room for the bandwidth of Watch and Watch +1, Virgin Media stops broadcasting UKTV History +1 and UKTV Documentary +1.
  - 9 October – UKTV announces that UKTV Documentary and UKTV People would be rebranded as Eden and Blighty respectively in early 2009.
  - 11 November – UKTV announces that UKTV History would be rebranded as Yesterday.
- 2009
  - 22 January – Dave +1 launches on Freeview.
  - 26 January – UKTV Documentary rebrands as the natural history–focused Eden.
  - 17 February – UKTV People rebrands as the UK-focused Blighty.
  - 24 February – Dave +1 rebrands as "Dave ja vu".
  - 2 March – UKTV History rebrands as Yesterday.
  - 30 April – UKTV Style rebrands as Home, and reinstates gardening programmes.
  - 19 May – UKTV Gardens relaunches as the female-orientated lifestyle medical real-life and crime channel Really. The gardening programmes move to Home.
  - 22 June – UKTV Food rebrands as Good Food.

== 2010s ==
- 2010
  - 31 August – UKTV launches its first high definition channel with Good Food HD, exclusively to Sky.
  - 4 October – UKTV launches Eden HD, also as a Sky exclusive.
- 2011
  - 2 August – Really becomes a free-to-air network as it launches on Freeview.
  - 15 August – Virgin Media agrees to sell its 50% stake in UKTV to Scripps Networks Interactive in a deal worth £339m.
  - 7 October
    - High definition versions of Dave and Watch launch.
    - Good Food HD and Eden HD are added to Virgin Media in addition to the other two networks as part of a deal concerning the UKTV sale. The timeshifts of Eden +1 and Yesterday +1 are also reinstated on the platform.
- 2012
  - 3 July – Alibi HD launches.
- 2013
  - 26 March – To coincide with its 21st birthday, UKTV rebrands with a new logo and reinstates their brand on-screen.
  - 8 July – A new free-to-air network, Drama, launches on Freeview, and replaces Blighty on Sky and Virgin Media, although it was not launched on the latter until 14 August.
- 2014
  - 4 August – UKTV launches its video on demand service UKTV Play.
- 2015
  - 8 December – Yesterday, Drama, and Really launch on Freesat.
- 2016
  - 6 January – UKTV announces that Dave will show its first live sporting event, a boxing match between David Haye and Mark de Mori at the O2 Arena on 16 January 2016. Later in the year, Dave broadcasts the 2016 BDO World Trophy darts tournament and cricket's Caribbean Premier League.
  - 15 February – Watch is renamed W and among the programming on the relaunched channel is a same-day repeat of EastEnders. The deal also sees the return of the weekend omnibus edition. W shows the repeats until April 2018.
  - 1 March – Home becomes a free-to-air network as it launches on Freeview.
- 2017
  - 1 August – Dave and Home launch on Freesat.
  - 2 October – Gold HD launches on Sky (replacing Eden HD). It appears on Virgin Media in September 2018 and on BT TV in March 2019.
- 2018
  - 22 July – The UKTV channels stop broadcasting on Virgin Media following a breakdown of discussions in which they had demanded a huge drop in the amount of money it pays UKTV for its channels due to the lack of UKTV's ability to offer on-demand BBC programming. The dispute receives considerable media attention.
  - 11 August – The UKTV channels return to Virgin Media with the addition of Gold HD.
- 2019
  - 1 April – Discovery Inc. announces that it will acquire BBC Studios' stakes in Good Food, Home and Really, while BBC Studios will acquire Discovery's stakes in the seven remaining UKTV networks for £173million.
  - 11 June
    - Discovery Inc. takes full control of Good Food, Home and Really.
    - BBC Studios takes full control of UKTV and its remaining seven channels.
  - 12 September – Good Food closes, with its shows moving to Food Network.

== 2020s ==
- 2020
  - October – UKTV Media Ltd takes control of Craft Channel Host Ltd, the company behind Freeview channel CCXTV.
- 2021
  - 1 February – CCXTV closes and its Freeview slot is allocated to Drama +1.
- 2022
  - March – W becomes a free-to-air channel, initially launching on Freesat prior to its launch on Freeview on 28 March.
- 2023
  - 23 and 24 August – UKTV launches its first four FAST channels with UKTV Play Heroes, UKTV Play Laughs, UKTV Play Full Throttle and UKTV Play Uncovered.
- 2024
  - 16 July – UKTV's Freeview channels rebrand under the 'U' name with U& coming before the channel name on 16 July. (For example, U&Dave.) While UKTV’s FAST channels were rebranded to U&Real Heroes, U&Laughs, U&Transport and U&The Past respectively. The three pay channels will follow suit later in the year. UKTV rebrands to coincide with the 'U' masterbrand.
  - 16 October – Eden launches on Freeview, thereby becoming the fifth UKTV channel to broadcast on the platform, and is rebranded to U&Eden to match the other channels. The channel's move to free-to-air broadcasting comes a few months after its output was widened to include other factual and reality programming, with nature programming on the channel becoming increasingly rare.
  - 7 November – UKTV completes its roll-out of the U brand when its two pay channels Gold and Alibi rebrand to U&Gold and U&Alibi.
- 2025
  - U&Eden completes its move away from broadcasting natural history programming although some had returned by the start of the following year.
