= UKTV Bright Ideas =

Former television channel by UKTV

- Logo used from 2004 to 2007

Ownership
- Owner: UKTV (BBC Worldwide/Virgin Media)
- Sister channels: UKTV Documentary; UKTV Drama; UKTV Food; UKTV G2; UKTV Gardens; UKTV Gold; UKTV History; UKTV People; UKTV Style

History
- Launched: 15 January 2003
- Closed: 14 October 2007
- Replaced by: Dave (Freeview); UKTV Style +2 (Sky)
- Former names: UK Bright Ideas (2003‍–‍2004)

UKTV Bright Ideas is a defunct digital television channel broadcast in the United Kingdom, which was part of the UKTV family of channels. The channel broadcast a variety of programmes, often originally aired on UKTV Style, UKTV Food and UKTV Gardens, and are thus mainly cookery, DIY and gardening. The channel broadcast from 6 am to 6 pm every day, timesharing with Ftn.

== History ==
On 3 October 2002, the channel was announced under the name of UK HomeStyle, as part of a preparation of networks on the Freeview service. Unlike the other free-to-air offering from UKTV – UK History, UK HomeStyle would be a highlights network that would showcase programming from UK Style and UK Food for the Freeview audience, offering them what is shown on their paid networks. On 12 December, it was announced that the channel would officially launch as UK Bright Ideas, due to trademark issues with the original name and its other planned name UK Homes.

The channel was launched on 15 January 2003. The channel was initially only shown on the Freeview digital terrestrial television platform, but later expanded to air on Sky Digital, NTL and Telewest.

Along with the rest of the UKTV network, the "UK" prefix was changed to "UKTV" on 8 March 2004 and it became UKTV Bright Ideas.

=== Closure ===
On 8 August 2007, it was announced that UKTV would replace UKTV Bright Ideas with a relaunched version of UKTV G2 on the Freeview platform. This was finalised in September 2007, when they officially announced that UKTV G2 would be rebranded as Dave and launch on Freeview, replacing UKTV Bright Ideas. Another reason for its closure was because the channel only averaged 0.1% of the audience share.

UKTV Bright Ideas ceased broadcasting on all platforms on 14 October 2007 at 6pm. The last programme on the channel was an episode of Antiques Roadshow, followed by a promotion of Dave. The following day, the bandwidth space that UKTV Bright Ideas used with Virgin1 (the ex-Ftn) would become home to UKTV History, downgrading its hours on the platform, while Dave launched in UKTV History's bandwidth.
