= UKTV Gardens =

Former television channel by UKTV

- Logo used from 2007 to 2009
- Country: United Kingdom

Programming
- Picture format: 16:9, 576i (SDTV)

Ownership
- Owner: UKTV (BBC Worldwide/Virgin Media)
- Sister channels: Alibi; Blighty; Dave; Eden; G.O.L.D. Home; UKTV Food; Watch; Yesterday

History
- Launched: 23 February 2005
- Closed: 19 May 2009
- Replaced by: Really
- Former names: UKTV Style Gardens (2005‍–‍2007)

UKTV Gardens was a digital television channel broadcasting in the United Kingdom, part of the UKTV family of channels. As its name suggests, the channel focused entirely on gardening shows. When it originally launched, the channel was known as UKTV Style Gardens on 23 February 2005 and all the gardening content from UKTV Style was moved to the new channel. In early 2007, it adopted the more independent name UKTV Gardens.

It was available on Sky Digital and Virgin Media.

== 2009 closure and replacement ==
As part of the UKTV rebrand, UKTV Style along with UKTV Gardens and UKTV Food were the third phase of the rebrand, with UKTV Style rebranded as Home on 30 April 2009 and UKTV Food as Good Food on 22 June 2009, and UKTV Gardens was closed down and was replaced with Really on 19 May 2009 with all the gardening programmes that were on this channel transferring to Home.
