= Blighty (TV channel) =

Television channel by UKTV

- Logo used from 2009 to 2013
- Country: United Kingdom
- Broadcast area: United Kingdom; Ireland

Programming
- Picture format: 16:9, 576i (SDTV)
- Timeshift service: UKTV People +1 (2005–2006)

Ownership
- Owner: UKTV (BBC Worldwide/Scripps Networks Interactive)
- Sister channels: U&Alibi; U&Dave; U&Eden; U&Gold; Good Food; Home; Really; U&W; U&Yesterday

History
- Launched: 8 March 2004
- Replaced: UK Horizons
- Closed: 5 July 2013
- Replaced by: Drama
- Former names: UKTV People (2004–2009)

Links
- Website: uktv.co.uk/blighty

Blighty was a British pay television channel broadcasting as part of the UKTV network of channels. The channel was originally launched on 8 March 2004.

== History ==
The channel launched on 8 March 2004 as UKTV People, showing repeats of lighter factual programming, based on the people of the world with programmes such as Top Gear and the docusoap Airport. Much of this programming had come from the spinoff for UK Horizons, which had closed down the day before. The channel itself, along with UKTV Documentary, replaced this channel formally. For the channel's first few months, it timeshared with UKTV Food +1, airing from 7pm-3am, but soon expanded to a full 24-hour schedule by 1 July.

On 9 October 2008, UKTV announced plans to rebrand UKTV People and UKTV Documentary in early 2009. The news came just two days after UKTV's entertainment channels were rebranded to Watch, Gold and Alibi. They announced that UKTV People would be rebranded as Blighty and this rebrand took place on 17 February 2009. As part of the rebrand, some programmes were transferred to channels such as sister channel Dave, while the channel acquired some other programmes looking at British life.

The channel closed at midday on 5 July 2013, replaced by Drama (now U&Drama) on 8 July.

== Timeshift ==
On 12 January 2005, UKTV launched a time shift service called UKTV People +1 It was exclusively available on Sky Digital, and ran exactly the same broadcast on a one-hour delay. It also ran for the same hours as its main channel, except an hour ahead.

For unknown reasons, the service closed on 18 April 2006, and was removed from the Sky EPG afterwards. Its bandwidth would be reused for UKTV Drama +1 which launched two weeks later on 2 May, however unlike UKTV People +1, UKTV Drama +1 initially aired as a part-time service.

== Identity ==
When the channel launched as UKTV People, the idents all featured people depicted from different angles set against a screen split in four, before fading into the stacked UKTV People logo. In January 2007, new idents were introduced that include a live-action footage where the people are working or having activities (e.g. building site, shopping centre) before a red part moving into the stacked UKTV People logo over a three striped red background. This same background also featured on promotions for the channel, both on the channel and across the network.

When the rebrand to Blighty occurred, a new logo was designed consisting of a brightly coloured Union Flag. This is seen on a large scale flying behind the scenes depicted in front. These scenes included many people and centred on a number of typically British themes: rain, with large wellies, business men with umbrellas and people camping; sun with beach scenes, and other summer activities; tea, with all methods of making tea celebrated alongside cakes and biscuits and multicultural, featuring foreign dances and Indian food and spices.

== Programming ==
Much of the channels programming focused on repeated programming, mainly but not exclusively from the BBC, who held a 50 percent stake in the channel through commercial arm BBC Worldwide. Additionally, BBC programmes were edited to fit the time slot as an original broadcast for an hour-long programme on the BBC might be as much as 58 minutes long, whereas the same programme on Blighty might be 42 minutes long without the commercials.

- 999
- A Life of Grime
- A Life of Grime New York
- Air Medics
- Amazing Adventures of a Nobody
- Andrew Marr's History of Modern Britain
- A Picture of Britain
- Billy Connolly's World Tour of England, Ireland and Wales
- Billy Connolly's World Tour of Scotland
- Billy Connolly's World Tour of Australia
- Blackpool Medics
- Blues and Twos
- Britain From Above
- Britain In Motion
- British Style Genius
- The Britpop Story
- The Builders
- Coast
- Dog Borstal
- Escape to the Country
- Fantasy Homes by the Sea
- Gardeners' World
- Gutted
- Heir Hunters
- Jeremy Clarkson Meets the Neighbours
- James May's Toy Stories
- James May's 20th Century
- James May's Big Ideas
- James May's Top Toys
- Dom Joly's Made in Britain
- Market Kitchen
- Monarchy: The Royal Family at Work
- My Brilliant Britain
- Rhodes Across China
- Rescue Heroes
- Rory and Paddy's Great British Adventure
- Ian Hislop's Scouting for Boys
- Save Our Boozer
- Seaside Rescue
- Sky Cops
- Trawlermen
- Traffic Cops
- Who Do You Think You Are?
- Wonderland: The Man Who Eats Badgers

== See also ==
- UKTV
- Television in the United Kingdom
