= DMAX (British TV channel) =

British TV channel owned by Warner Bros. Discovery

Programming
- Picture format: 576i SDTV
- Timeshift service: DMAX +1

Ownership
- Owner: Warner Bros. Discovery International
- Sister channels: Animal Planet; Boomerang; Cartoon Network; Cartoonito; CNN International; Discovery Channel; Discovery History; Discovery Science; Discovery Turbo; Food Network; Investigation Discovery; Quest; Quest Red; Really; TLC

History
- Launched: 8 January 2008; 18 years ago
- Replaced: OBE +1 (Sky); Travel Channel (Freesat, Freeview)

Links
- Website: www.discoveryplus.com/gb/channel/dmax

Availability

Terrestrial
- Freeview: Channel 39

Streaming media
- Virgin TV Go: Watch live (UK only); Watch live (+1) (UK only)
- Virgin TV Anywhere: Watch live (Ireland only)

DMAX is a British free-to-air male-oriented TV channel in the United Kingdom and Ireland. Discovery launched the channel in the UK and Ireland market on 8 January 2008 after its initial success in Germany.

== Channel numbering ==
On 16 July 2015, DMAX moved from 144 to 167 on Sky, switching places with sister channel Quest.

Following the re-combination of the Entertainment and Lifestyle & Culture sections of the Sky guide, Discovery relocated some of their stations on the platform, resulting in DMAX being pushed down the grid to allow Discovery Home & Health to be moved up.

In the May 2018 reorganisation of the Sky main guide, DMAX moved to channel 178.

On 7 January 2019, it was announced that DMAX would become a free-to-air channel and be carried on Freeview (channel number 42) and Freesat (channel number 150) from 16 January, replacing sister channel Travel Channel.

On 12 June 2019, DMAX moved to channel 37 on the Freeview platform as part of a reshuffle due to its owner, Discovery, Inc. acquiring Good Food, Home and Really from the UKTV network as part of a deal with BBC Studios. On 4 November 2020, the channel moved to channel 38 as part of a move up where every channel from channel 24 to 54 on the platform moved up one place to allow BBC Four to move to channel 24 in Scotland due to new Ofcom rules giving greater prominence to certain public service channels.

== Timeshifted variants ==
The one-hour timeshift service DMAX +1 has been available on Sky since the launch of DMAX, originally on channel 206, before moving to channel 145 after Cellcast Group had sold Sumo TV and Sumo TV +1's EPG slots to Discovery Communications for £1.4m as well as moving Sumo TV down to DMAX +1's former slot.

On 30 April 2013 TLC launched on channel 125, resulting in Challenge being relocated from there to channel 145, leading to DMAX +1 being moved to Sky channel 238. As of August 2014, following further guide changes, DMAX +1 was on Sky channel 233.

In the May 2018 reorganisation, timeshifts of channels in the first 99 places were placed on the corresponding position in the 200 range, so when DMAX moved to 178, DMAX +1 was shifted to 278.

The DMAX +1 service went free-to-air alongside the parent channel in 2019 and took the place of Travel Channel +1 on the Freesat guide.

A two-hour timeshift channel named DMAX +2 launched on Sky on 1 April 2008. DMAX +2 closed on 30 April 2013 when TLC launched, with the accompanying TLC +1 launched on channel 195, which had been DMAX +2.

Another timeshift channel named DMAX +1.5 launched on Sky on 18 August 2008. DMAX +1.5 was closed down on 2 November 2009 when Quest +1 launched.
