= Good Food =

Former British television channel

- Country: United Kingdom and Ireland
- Broadcast area: United Kingdom; Ireland

Programming
- Language: English
- Picture format: 1080i HDTV (downscaled to 16:9 576i for the SDTV feed)
- Timeshift service: Good Food +1

Ownership
- Owner: UKTV (2001–2019); Discovery, Inc. (June–September 2019)
- Sister channels: Animal Planet; Discovery Channel; Discovery HD; Discovery History; Discovery Home & Health; Discovery Science; Discovery Shed; Discovery Turbo; DMAX; Food Network; Home; Investigation Discovery; Quest; Quest Red; Really; TLC; Travel Channel

History
- Launched: 5 November 2001
- Closed: 12 September 2019
- Former names: UK Food (2001–2004); UKTV Food (2004–2009)

Availability

Streaming media
- Sky Go: Watch live (UK and Ireland only)

Good Food (formerly UK Food and UKTV Food) was a British pay television channel broadcasting in the United Kingdom and Ireland, latterly as part of the Discovery, Inc. network of channels. The channel originally launched on 5 November 2001 and relaunched in its final format on 22 June 2009. Good Food was available on satellite through Sky, on cable through Virgin Media, and through IPTV with TalkTalk TV, BT TV. From 2015 to 2018, Good Food was temporarily rebranded as Christmas Food.

== History ==
Prior to the launch of the channel, UK Style was the home to food programmes in the UKTV network. The increasing addition of more lifestyle programmes on UK Style led to these programmes overcrowding the schedule. On 11 July 2001, UKTV announced they would launch UK Food in November. The channel officially launched on 5 November, broadcasting from 7:00 am to 7:00 pm everyday, timesharing with UK Drama.

On 29 May 2002, UK Food launched on NTL.

On 10 January 2003, after a successful first year gaining 7.5 million viewers since its launch, UKTV announced that UK Food would extend broadcast hours to 5:00 am – 9:00 pm, gaining four more hours in its slot. To make up for this, UK Drama reduced its hours to 9:00 pm – 5:00 am. On 12 November, a one‑hour timeshift service – UK Food +1, launched, airing between 6:00 am and 7:00 pm every day.

On 8 March 2004, UK Food and UK Food +1 were renamed as UKTV Food and UKTV Food +1, respectively. On the same day, UK Horizons' half-replacement UKTV People launched in UKTV Food +1's evening slot, airing from 7:00 pm to 4:00 am. On 22 June, it was announced that UKTV Food would extend its broadcast hours to end at 1:00 am, with the possibility of going 24 hours at the end of the year. At the same time, it was also announced that UKTV People would move out of UKTV Food +1's downtime slot and extend its broadcast hours as well. With the extension of the broadcast hours, UKTV Drama moved into the vacated evening slot on UKTV Food +1's slot.

After UKTV Drama extended its broadcast hours to the daytime in May 2005, UKTV Food +1's evening slot remained vacant, and on 23 February 2006, to coincide with Sky's EPG shuffle, it was announced that UKTV Food +1 would extend broadcast hours to include the entire day.

As part of the rebranding of UKTV's channels to a unique name and identity, UKTV Food rebranded as Good Food on 22 June 2009, the last of UKTV's brands to do so. The name was based on that of the BBC Good Food cookery magazine, published by Immediate Media Company. The channel and the magazine continued to be operated separately. On 13 July 2009, Virgin Media revealed that they were "currently in active talks" with UKTV about launching a high-definition version of Good Food on their cable television platform.

On 31 August 2010, Good Food became the first UKTV channel to broadcast in high definition when Good Food HD launched as a Sky exclusive. As with a majority of HD channels, Good Food HD was an HD simulcast of the channel's schedule.

As part of Virgin Media's deal to sell its share of UKTV, all five of UKTV's HD channels were added to Virgin's cable television service by 2012. Good Food HD was added to Virgin Media on 7 October 2011.

On 1 April 2019, it was announced that UKTV co-owner Discovery Inc. would acquire the BBC's stake in Good Food. They took it over along with sister channels Home and Really in June. On 5 September 2019, Discovery announced that Good Food would merge with Food Network and close on 12 September 2019, with its programmes moving to the sister channel. Good Food was removed from Virgin Media on 11 September, while the channel itself was shut down on 12 September 2019, after which the channel space created in 2001 by UK Food ceased to exist. The last programme shown was an episode of Choccywoccydoodah.

== On-air identity ==
Good Food's old logo as UKTV Food

When UK Food launched in 2001, the channel adopted a branding package based around circular shaped foods with a spiral pattern located in the centre when looked at from above. The channel's logo at the time featured the name, stylised as ^{UK} Food, and a two lined spiral extending outwards from the right of the name. The majority of UKTV channels had some pattern located there to distinguish the channel, and this spiral also featured in the idents themselves as well as channel promotions.

Following the rebranding as UKTV Food, the channel's identity was altered. The swirling motif was retained within the idents themselves: the logo was the only thing changed. Indeed, many of the previous idents survived rebrand reuse. The primary difference was the addition of the two-lined UKTV logo, aligned to the left of the screen. The channel's colour was orange, and was used in different shades as the background colour to all promotion end boards and static slides both on the channel and for promotion across the network.

Following the rebrand to Good Food, the idents changed to sequences involving the coming together of ingredients to events such as a picnic barbecue, a dinner party and a family Sunday roast. The idents finished with an endboard featuring the circular Good Food logo in the centre of a screen with food imagery in the background, such as fish outlines, knife and fork or wine glasses.

== Former programming ==
Good Food used a large amount of programming from the BBC's programme archive, and was similar to a former international channel run by BBC Worldwide called BBC Food, as both use similar programming and both have a similar format. The channel also aired programmes from the ITV and Channel 4 programming archive and programming aired on other domestic and international channels bought in by the channel. These programmes included:

- 24 Hour Restaurant Battle
- 4 Ingredients
- 50 Things to Eat Before You Die
- Aaron Craze: Rude Boy Food
- Ace of Cakes
- Alive and Cooking
- Anthony Bourdain: No Reservations
- Atul's Spice Kitchen: Malaysia
- Barefoot Contessa
- BBQ University: Steven Raichlen
- The Best in Australia
- Beyond River Cottage
- Bill's Food
- Bill's Kitchen: Notting Hill
- Bill's Tasty Weekends
- Burger Bar to Gourmet Star
- Carnival Eats
- Caribbean Food Made Easy
- Catherine's Italian Kitchen
- Charly's Cake Angels
- Chefs and the City
- Chinese Food Made Easy
- Ching's Kitchen
- Choccywoccydoodah
- A Cook Abroad
- Cooks' Questions
- David Rocco's India
- Delia's How to Cook
- Destination Flavour: Down Under
- Destination Flavour: Japan
- Destination Flavour: Singapore
- Dinner: Impossible
- Donal's Asian Baking Adventure
- Donal's Meals in Minutes
- Donna Hay: Basics to Brilliance
- Donut Showdown
- Drive Thru Australia
- E Numbers: An Edible Adventure
- Eat Well for Less?
- Eating with the Enemy
- Escape to River Cottage
- Everyday Gourmet with Justine Schofield
- Exploring China: A Culinary Adventure
- Family Supercooks
- Floyd on Britain and Ireland
- Floyd on Fish
- Floyd on Food
- Floyd on France
- Floyd's American Pie
- Food and Drink
- Food Detectives
- Food Uncut
- Fresh from the Sea
- Gary Rhodes' Local Food Heroes
- Gino D'Acampo: An Italian in Mexico
- Gino D'Acampo: An Italian Returns to Mexico
- Gioconda Scott's Paradise Kitchen
- Giorgio Locatelli: Pure Italian
- Gizzi Erskine: Seoul Food
- Gok Cooks Chinese
- Good Chef Bad Chef
- The Good Cook
- Gordon's Great Escape
- Gordon Ramsay's Home Cooking
- Gordon Ramsay's Ultimate Cookery Course
- The Great British Bake Off
- The Great British Bake Off Masterclass
- Great British Menu
- Great Food Live
- Grow Your Own Drugs
- The Hairy Bakers
- The Hairy Bikers Ride Again
- The Hairy Bikers: Mums Know Best
- The Hairy Bikers' Asian Adventure
- Hairy Bikers' Bakeation
- Hairy Bikers' Best of British
- The Hairy Bikers' Chicken and Egg
- The Hairy Bikers' Cook Off
- The Hairy Bikers' Cookbook
- Hairy Bikers' Everyday Gourmets
- The Hairy Bikers' Food Tour of Britain
- Hairy Bikers' Mississippi Adventure
- The Hairy Bikers' Northern Exposure
- Heaven's Kitchen at Large
- Heston's Gourmet Escape
- Heston's Great British Food
- Heston Blumenthal: In Search of Perfection
- Inside Heston's World
- Iron Chef Australia
- Island Feast with Peter Kuruvita
- Jack Stein: Born to Cook
- James Martin Digs Deep
- James Martin: Champagne
- James Martin: Delicious
- James Martin: Home Comforts
- James Martin: Sweet
- James Martin: Yorkshire's Finest
- James Martin's Brittany
- James Martin's Favourite Feasts
- James Martin's Food Map of Britain
- James Martin's French Road Trip
- James Martin's Mediterranean
- James Martin's United Cakes of America
- Jamie Does...
- Jamie's 30-Minute Meals
- Jamie's American Road Trip
- Jamie's Fish Suppers
- Jamie's Great Britain
- Jamie's Money Saving Meals
- Jamie's Super Food
- John Torode's Asia
- John Torode's Australia
- John Torode's Korean Food Tour
- John Torode's Malaysian Adventure
- John Torode's Middle East
- Junior Bake Off
- Kitchen Hero
- Kitchen Hero: Donal's Irish Feast
- Kitchen Hero: Great Food for Less
- Kitchen Showdown with Rosemary Shrager
- Kylie Kwong: My China
- The Little Paris Kitchen: Cooking with Rachel Khoo
- Lorraine's Fast, Fresh and Easy Food
- Lorraine Pascale: How to Be a Better Cook
- Luke Nguyen's Asian Food Trail
- Luke Nguyen's France
- Luke Nguyen's Greater Mekong
- Luke Nguyen's Memories of Vietnam
- Luke Nguyen's Street Food Asia
- Luke Nguyen's United Kingdom
- Luke Nguyen's Vietnam
- Madhur Jaffrey's Curry Nation
- Man v. Food
- Market Kitchen
- Market Kitchen: Big Adventure
- Martha Bakes
- Mary Berry at Home
- MasterChef (Now shown on BBC One)
- MasterChef: The Professionals
- MasterChef Australia (Now shown on W)
- MasterChef Ireland
- Matt Tebbutt's South Africa
- Mexican Fiesta with Peter Kuruvita
- Michela's Tuscan Kitchen
- Mitch and Matt's Big Fish
- Monster Munchies
- My Kitchen...
- My Sri Lanka with Peter Kuruvita
- My Restaurant Rules
- The Naked Chef
- Nadiya's British Food Adventure
- New British Kitchen
- Nigel and Adam's Farm Kitchen
- Nigel Slater's Dish of the Day
- Nigel Slater's Real Food
- Nigel Slater's Simple Cooking
- Nigel Slater's Simple Suppers
- Nigella Bites
- Nigellissima
- Oliver's Twist
- The Opener
- Ottolenghi's Mediterranean Feast
- Paul Hollywood's Bread
- Paul Hollywood's Pies and Puds
- Perfect...
- Peter Kuruvita's Coastal Kitchen
- Primal Grill with Steven Raichlen
- Rachel's Coastal Cooking
- Rachel's Favourite Food...
- Rachel's Favourite Food at Home
- Rachel's Favourite Food for Friends
- Rachel's Favourite Food for Living
- Rachel Allen: All Things Sweet
- Rachel Allen: Bake!
- Rachel Allen's Cake Diaries
- Rachel Allen's Dinner Parties
- Rachel Allen's Easy Meals
- Rachel Allen's Everyday Kitchen
- Rachel Khoo's Kitchen Notebook: Cosmopolitan Cook
- Rachel Khoo's Kitchen Notebook: London
- Raymond Blanc's Kitchen Secrets
- Ready Steady Cook
- Return to River Cottage
- Rhodes Across India
- Rhodes Across Italy
- Rhodes Across the Caribbean
- Rick Stein: From Venice to Istanbul
- Rick Stein and the Japanese Ambassador
- Rick Stein Tastes the Blues
- Rick Stein's Cabin Fever
- Rick Stein's Far Eastern Odyssey
- Rick Stein's Food Heroes
- Rick Stein's Food Heroes: Another Helping
- Rick Stein's French Odyssey
- Rick Stein's Fresh Food
- Rick Stein's Fruits of the Sea
- Rick Stein's German Bite
- Rick Stein's India
- Rick Stein's Long Weekends
- Rick Stein's Mediterranean Escapes
- Rick Stein's Seafood Lovers' Guide
- Rick Stein's Seafood Odyssey
- Rick Stein's Spain
- Rick Stein's Taste of Shanghai
- Rick Stein's Taste of the Sea
- River Cottage Australia
- River Cottage Every Day
- River Cottage Forever
- River Cottage to the Core
- The River Cottage Treatment
- River Cottage Veg
- Ronnie Corbett's Supper Club
- The Roux Legacy
- Roux Scholarship
- Safari Chef with Mike Robinson
- Saturday Kitchen
- Scandimania
- Secret Meat Business
- Simon Hopkinson Cooks
- Simon Rimmer's Dinners
- Simply Nigella
- Sophie Grigson's Weekends
- Spain... on the Road Again
- Sweet Baby James
- The Supersizers...
- Tales from River Cottage
- Tamasin's Weekends
- Tareq Taylor's Nordic Cookery
- Taste of Greece
- A Taste of the Caribbean
- The Thai Way
- Tom Kerridge's Proper Pub Food
- Top Chef
- Top Chef Masters
- Top Chef: Just Desserts
- Turkish Delights with Allegra McEvedy
- Tuscany to Go
- Two Fat Ladies
- Two Greedy Italians
- Use Your Loaf
- Valentine Warner: Coast to Coast
- Valentine Warner Eats Scandinavia
- Victoria Wood's Nice Cup of Tea
- The View from River Cottage
- Weekend Kitchen
- World's Best Restaurants
- World's Weirdest Restaurants
- Worrall Thompson
- You Gotta Eat Here!

== Website ==
The Good Food website, originally devised and launched by Ian Fenn and Ally Branley, provided information on programmes shown on the channel, recipes, message boards, and a wine club. Recipes came from the various shows on Good Food and some included videos taken from the demonstrations. In September 2006, Good Food's website overtook the BBC Food site in popularity for the first time, achieving a 10% market share, compared to BBC Food's 9.63% share. The channel's website now redirects to Food Network's UK website.

== See also ==
- UKTV
- Television in the United Kingdom
- BBC Food
- BBC Magazines
