= UK Horizons =

British TV channel

- UK Horizons logo from 1997 to 2001

Programming
- Timeshift service: UK Horizons +1

Ownership
- Owner: UKTV (BBC Worldwide/Flextech)

History
- Launched: 1 November 1997
- Closed: 8 March 2004
- Replaced by: UKTV Documentary, UKTV People

Links
- Website: www.ukhorizons.co.uk (no longer active)

Availability (at time of closure)

Terrestrial
- ONdigital: Channel 43

UK Horizons was a television channel broadcast in the United Kingdom, as part of the UKTV network of channels, showing mainly documentaries originally produced by the BBC. Most programmes were abridged for commercial timing purposes. It took its name from the BBC series Horizon, which formed a staple of its output in the early years.

== History ==
It was launched on 1 November 1997 along with UK Arena and UK Style. It also produced extended versions of top BBC brands such as Top Gear and Tomorrow's World. The launch editor was Bryher Scudamore and the deputy editor Eddie Tulasiewicz.

The channel was rebranded with a new look on 8 May 2001, with a one-hour timeshift service - UK Horizons +1 Hour, later shortened simply to UK Horizons +1, launching on the same day on Sky Digital. On 5 November, the channel's broadcast hours were changed to 9:00am-3:00am (10:00am-4:00am for +1 Hour).

On 15 February 2002, UK Horizons +1 launched on Telewest, broadcasting between 6:00pm-6:00am, timesharing with UK Style + which also launched on Telewest on the same day. and on 29 May, had launched on NTL as well. In July 2002, UKTV announced an offshoot network to the channel - UK History, which would launch in October 2002.

On 3 February 2004, UKTV announced that the channel would close down and split into two new networks - UKTV Documentary and UKTV People. The changeover took place on 8 March 2004, with UKTV Documentary taking over the UK Horizons and UK Horizons +1 networks on Sky and Telewest and UKTV People launching as a standalone network. On NTL, UKTV People took over UK Horizons +1's slot.
