= Curvy Brides =

American reality television series

- Starring: Yuneisia Harris; Yukia Walker
- Country of origin: United States
- Original language: English
- No. of seasons: 1
- No. of episodes: 13

Production
- Running time: 21 minutes
- Production company: Half Yard Productions

Original release
- Network: TLC
- Release: August 1, 2014 – June 5, 2015

Curvy Brides is an American reality television series which aired on TLC. The show is centered around Curvaceous Couture Bridal, a family-owned bridal salon catering to plus-size women in Columbia, Maryland. Episodes feature sisters and Curvaceous Couture co-owners Yukia Walker and Yuneisia Harris helping brides find the dress of their dreams for their wedding day.

Curvy Brides resembles the rest of TLC's wedding-themed programming, like the popular Say Yes to the Dress, but focuses brides sized 12-44 that have more trouble finding dresses that fit and flatter their bodies. Brides profiled on the show often cannot find gowns in their size in traditional stores and discuss being treated rudely and discouraged from shopping at other bridal salons.

== Episodes ==
No.	Title	Original release date
1	"Curvy Brides"	August 1, 2014
2	"Taking it to the Catwalk"	May 1, 2015
3	"Wedding Picture Perfect"	May 1, 2015
4	"Mom Knows Best"	May 8, 2015
5	"Mark Downs and High Stakes"	May 8, 2015
6	"Bridal Market Bling"	May 15, 2015
7	"Brides that Inspire and a Project Prom Flyer"	May 15, 2015
8	"Weighing All the Options"	May 22, 2015
9	"A Diva and an Opera Singer Walk into a Bridal Shop"	May 22, 2015
10	"Anything Goes!"	May 29, 2015
11	"Daddy's Girl"	May 29, 2015
12	"The Bonds of Sisterhood"	June 5, 2015
13	"Don't Judge a Book by its Cover"	June 5, 2015
