= U&Drama =

UK TV channel owned by UKTV

- Logo used since 2024
- Broadcast area: United Kingdom and Ireland

Programming
- Language: English
- Picture format: 1080i HDTV (SDTV feed downscaled to 16:9 576i)
- Timeshift service: U&Drama +1

Ownership
- Owner: BBC Studios
- Parent: UKTV
- Sister channels: U&Alibi; U&Dave; U&Eden; U&Gold; U&W; U&Yesterday

History
- Launched: 8 July 2013; 13 years ago
- Replaced: Blighty; CCXTV (Drama +1, Freeview only)
- Former names: Drama (2013–2024)

Links
- Website: u.co.uk/channel/drama

Availability

Terrestrial
- Freeview: Channel 20; Channel 60 (+1)

Streaming media
- U: Watch Free (UK and Ireland Only)

U&Drama is a British free-to-air television channel broadcasting drama (and, to a lesser extent, comedy, sci-fi) programming in the United Kingdom and Ireland as part of the UKTV network of channels.

== History ==
The channel launched on 8 July 2013, replacing Blighty. The channel was initially launched on Freeview channel 20, which was previously occupied by Gold, and on Sky the channel was launched on channel 291, in the overspill area of the Entertainment section. It was moved to channel 166 on 24 July after purchasing the slot used by PBS America (formerly named PBS UK in 2011). The channel launched on Virgin Media on 14 August on channel 190. In September 2014, UKTV blamed the channel for their 7% profits fall. In September 2018, Drama and Really were added to Virgin Media Ireland, and on 16 July 2024, they rebranded to U&Drama.

Drama logo used from 2013 to 2024

== Channels ==
=== U&Drama HD ===
HD logo used since 16 July 2024

U&Drama HD is the higher resolution version of U&Drama available on Virgin Media.

=== U&Drama +1 ===
Timeshift logo used since 16 July 2024

A timeshift channel, Drama +1, was launched on Sky and Virgin Media on 16 September 2019, replacing Travel Channel +1. On 25 January 2021, it was announced that the timeshift channel would be taking over CCXTV's Freeview slot (channel 73) on 1 February 2021, with CCXTV ending transmission. On 1 February 2022, BBC Three relaunched on Freeview channel 23 which shifted all the channels from that slot until Freeview 82 down a place, meaning that Drama +1 was now on channel 74.

On 28 March 2022, Drama +1 moved to Freeview 60 as a limited reach channel, as channel 25 was used by UKTV for their female skewing W channel, which means that Dave ja vu took the COM4 slot from Drama +1 on Freeview channel 74.

== Programming ==
The channel is positioned as a home for "classic" British dramas. The channel has featured classic drama series such as Auf Wiedersehen, Pet; The Cinder Path; Cranford; Lark Rise to Candleford; Pride & Prejudice; Sharpe; and Tipping the Velvet. As well as all these classic drama titles, a number of more recently produced BBC One daytime drama series have acquired a primetime slot on Drama. These series include Father Brown and its spin-off series, Sister Boniface Mysteries. The channel's weekday schedule primarily consists of repeats of classic soap episodes: the schedule begins with an episode of The Bill, followed by episodes of Doctors, Holby City, Casualty, EastEnders and Neighbours.

=== Current ===
- Anna Pigeon Mysteries (October 6 2026)
- Art Detectives
- All Creatures Great and Small
- 'Allo 'Allo!
- Are You Being Served?
- As Time Goes By
- At Home with the Braithwaites
- Bergerac
- The Bill
- Birds of a Feather
- Born and Bred
- The Brittas Empire
- Blue Lights (series 1)
- Broken
- The Brokenwood Mysteries
- Brush Strokes
- Butterfiles
- Call the Midwife
- Campion
- Case Histories
- Classic Casualty
- Catch Me a Killer
- Classic Doctors
- Classic EastEnders
- Classic Holby City
- Classic Neighbours
- Clocking Off
- The Coroner
- Cranford
- Criminal Justice
- Cutting It
- Dalziel and Pascoe
- Dangerfield
- Death in Paradise
- Desmond's
- Dinnerladies
- Doctor Finlay
- Doctor Foster
- Down to Earth
- The Duchess of Duke Street
- Eldorado
- Escape from Sobibor
- Ever Decreasing Circles
- Father Brown
- Gentleman Jack
- Goodnight Sweetheart
- The Green Green Grass
- Hamish Macbeth
- Happy Valley
- Hetty Wainthropp Investigates
- Hi-de-Hi!
- Horrid Henry
- The House of Eliott
- Howards' Way
- Hustle
- In The Dark
- The Inspector Alleyn Mysteries
- Inspector George Gently
- The Inspector Lynley Mysteries
- Jonathan Creek
- Judge John Deed
- Just Good Friends
- Keeping Up Appearances
- Kingdom
- Lark Rise to Candleford
- Larva)
- The Last Detective
- Last of the Summer Wine
- Last Tango in Halifax
- London's Burning
- Lovejoy
- Luther
- Maisie Raine
- May to December
- McMafia
- Miss Marple
- The Missing
- Mistresses
- Monarch of the Glen
- Monsieur Spade
- The Musketeers
- New Tricks
- No Place Like Home
- One Foot in the Grave
- Outrageous
- Peak Practice
- Pie in the Sky
- Porridge
- The Porter (U only)
- Queers
- Rebellion
- Rebus
- Rillington Place
- Secret Army
- The Shadow Line
- Shakespeare & Hathaway: Private Investigators
- Sherlock
- Silent Witness
- Sister Boniface Mysteries
- Smother
- Soldier Soldier
- Some Mothers Do 'Ave 'Em
- Spooks
- Taggart
- Tenko
- Terry and June
- The Alienist
- The Count of Monte Cristo
- The First Lady
- The Murder Room
- The Upper Hand
- This Life
- To the Manor Born
- Top of the Lake (U only)
- You're Killing Me
- Waiting for God
- Waking the Dead
- Whatever Happened to the Likely Lads?
- When the Boat Comes In
- Whitechapel

=== Previous ===
- The 39 Steps
- The 60's: The Beatles Decade
- Atlantic Crossing (U only)
- Above and Beyond
- Act of Will
- Ahead of the Class
- Ain't Misbehavin'
- Annika
- Archangel
- Bad Girls
- Ballykissangel
- Bert and Dickie
- The Best of Men
- Between the Lines
- A Bit of a Do
- A Bit of Fry & Laurie
- Berlin Station (U only)
- Birdsong
- Boon
- Bring Me Morecambe & Wise
- Britains Best - Scotland
- Burton & Taylor
- Cadfael
- Casanova
- Catherine Cookson
- The Cazalets
- Cider with Rosie
- Citizen Smith
- Cold Comfort Farm
- The Courageous Heart of Irena Sendler
- The Crimson Petal and the White
- Creature Comforts
- Daniel Deronda

  The Darling Buds of May

- David Copperfield
- Deadline Gallipoli
- Death Comes to Pemberley
- Doctor Doctor
- Doctor Who
- EastEnders' Christmas Fallouts
- EastEnders: Unveiled - A Wedding Special
- Emma
- Empire
- Eric and Ernie
- The Fall and Rise of Reginald Perrin
- Family Tree
- Fanny Hill
- Find My Past
- A Fine Romance
- Footballers' Wives
- The Forsyte Saga
- A Garden for All Seasons
- The Good Life
- Gracie!
- Great British Ghosts
- Great Expectations
- The Great Train Robbery
- Hard Times
- Hattie
- Hitlers Bodyguards
- Hold the Dream
- House of Cards
- Jam & Jerusalem
- Jane Eyre
- King Solomon's Mines
- Land Girls
- Learners
- The Life and Adventures of Nicholas Nickleby
- The Liver Birds
- The Long Firm
- Manhattan (U only)
- Masters of Sex (U only)
- Madam Secretary (U only)
- Mansfield Park
- The Mayor of Casteridge
- Men Behaving Badly
- A Million Little Things (U only)
- Miss Fisher's Murder Mysteries
- The Most Wonderful Time of the Year
- Murder in Mind
- Murphy's Law
- The Mystery of a Hansom Cab
- The Mystery of Edwin Drood
- My Family
- My Hero
- North & South
- Northanger Abbey
- Oliver Twist
- Outnumbered
- Our Mutual Friend
- Parade's End
- PD James: Death in Holy Orders
- Persuasion
- Pride and Prejudice
- Ration Book Britain
- Rev.
- The Road to Coronation Street
- Rosemary & Thyme
- The Ruby in the Smoke
- Rumpole of the Bailey
- The Scarlet Pimpernel
- The Scold's Bridle
- The Sculptress
- The Secret of Crickley Hall
- Sense and Sensibility
- The Shadow in the North
- Sharpe
- Sherlock Holmes and the Secret Weapon
- Sherlock Holmes: Terror By Night
- Sherlock Holmes - The Case of the Silk Stocking
- Silk
- Shirley
- The Sinking of the Laconia
- Sisters of War
- Small Island
- South Riding
- State of Play
- Steptoe and Son (only series 1-6)
- The Tenant of Wildfell Hall
- Tell Me Your Secrets (U only)
- Tess of the d'Urbervilles
- Three Up, Two Down
- Tipping the Velvet
- To Be the Best
- Touching Evil
- Trial & Retribution
- The Turn of the Screw
- United
- Upstairs, Downstairs
- Vanity Fair
- The Vicar of Dibley
- The Whale
- What Remains
- Where the Heart Is
- Wish Me Luck
- A Woman of Substance
- A Year to Remember
- The Young Ones
- Young James Herriot
- Young Catherine
- You Rang, M'Lord?
