= TLC (British and Irish TV channel) =

British TV channel

- Logo used since 13 January 2026
- Country: United Kingdom
- Broadcast area: United Kingdom; Ireland

Programming
- Language: English
- Picture format: 1080i HDTV (downscaled to 16:9 576i for the SDTV feed)
- Timeshift service: TLC +1

Ownership
- Owner: Warner Bros. Discovery EMEA
- Sister channels: Animal Planet; Discovery Channel; Discovery History; Discovery Science; Discovery Turbo; DMAX; Food Network; Investigation Discovery; Quest; Quest Red; Really; Cartoon Network; Boomerang; Cartoonito; CNN International

History
- Launched: 30 April 2013; 13 years ago, 8pm
- Replaced: Discovery Real Time and Discovery Travel & Living (2005–2013); HGTV (on Freeview)

Links
- Website: uk.tlc.com

Availability

Terrestrial
- Freeview: Channel 12; Channel 99 (+1)

Streaming media
- Virgin TV Go: Watch live (UK only); Watch live (+1) (UK only)
- Virgin TV Anywhere: Watch live (Ireland only)

TLC is a British free-to-air television channel, owned by Skydance Corporation. It is based on the American cable network of the same name. It launched on 30 April 2013 at 8pm, replacing Discovery Real Time and DMAX +2.

== History ==
TLC (The Learning Channel) is an American network that originates in 1980. It launched on Astra satellite in October 1994 to viewers in the British Isles, the Benelux, France, Germany, and Scandinavia. It eventually became Discovery Home & Leisure and later Discovery Real Time as part of Discovery's catalogue of themed channels.

Beginning in 2011, Discovery gradually brought back TLC to European viewers and in March 2013 confirmed the launch of a UK and Ireland version. A +1 timeshift channel was also launched concurrently, replacing DMAX +2. Given that TLC was chasing a completely different demographic from the old TLC, Discovery treated it as a new channel launch rather than a return.

A two-hour timeshift, TLC +2, was launched on 16 September 2013. It closed down on 27 April 2018, and was rebranded as Discovery Turbo +1.

In January 2026, TLC became free-to-air on British platforms and refocused to a general entertainment channel with scripted and non-scripted comedy programming, as well as programmes from its existing lineup and new ID Programming. It joined the Freeview, Freesat and Freely lineups. In Ireland, only the HD and +1 channels became free-to-air, which are identical to the UK feed, but the SD feed remains encrypted because it broadcasts advertisements targeted to the Irish market.

== Programming ==
Programming consists of acquired shows and original commissions. That includes American scripted comedies like Young Sheldon and local British shows like Mock the Week, The Bad Foot Clinic and Katie Price's Pony Club. TLC also features Paramount Pictures films.

=== Current programming ===
==== Acquired shows ====
- 90 Day Fiancé
- Beachfront Bargain Hunt
- Brides of Beverly Hills
- Cake Boss
- Cheer Perfection
- Curvy Brides
- Extreme Couponing
- Here Comes Honey Boo Boo
- Breaking Amish
- Breaking the Faith
- Dating Naked
- Devious Maids
- Georgie & Mandy's First Marriage
- The Big Bang Theory
- The Dr. Oz Show
- The Exes
- The Golden Girls
- Gypsy Brides US
- Hollywood Demons
- OutDaughtered
- I Didn't Know I Was Pregnant
- Last Chance Saloon
- Long Island Medium
- The Middle (3 August 2026)
- Mike & Molly
- Mistresses
- My Mother Is Obsessed
- My Lottery Dream Home
- My Strange Addiction
- The Nanny
- Oprah's Lifeclass
- Oprah's Next Chapter
- Ruby & Jodi: A Cult of Sin and Influence
- People Magazine Investigates
- Toddlers & Tiaras
- Say Yes to the Dress
- Scorned
- Secret Princes
- Super Soul Sunday
- Swinger Wives
- The Cult Behind the Killer: The Andrea Yates Story
- Your Style in His Hands
- Young Sheldon
- The Rocky Mountain Mortician Murder

==== Original commissions ====
- Celebrity Fat Fighters
- Jodie Marsh On...
- Last Chance Salon
- My Naked Secret
- Ultimate Shopper
- Undercover Mums
- Your Style in His Hands
- The Charlotte Crosby Experience
- If Katie Hopkins Ruled the World
- Katie Price's Pony Club
- Say Yes to the Dress: UK
- Curvy Brides Boutique
- Mock the Week (Originally on BBC Two, new episodes aired on TLC since 2026)
- Zero Stars
- Unacceptable
