= U&Yesterday =

UKTV channel in the United Kingdom and Ireland

- Logo used since 2024
- Country: United Kingdom
- Broadcast area: United Kingdom and Ireland

Programming
- Language: English
- Picture format: 1080i HDTV (downscaled to 16:9 576i for the SDTV feed)
- Timeshift service: U&Yesterday +1

Ownership
- Owner: BBC Studios
- Parent: UKTV
- Sister channels: U&Alibi; U&Dave; U&Drama; U&Eden; U&Gold; U&W

History
- Launched: 30 October 2002; 24 years ago
- Replaced: Play UK
- Former names: UK History (2002–04); UKTV History (2004–09); Yesterday (2009–24)

Links
- Website: u.co.uk/channel/yesterday

Availability

Terrestrial
- Freeview: Channel 27

U&Yesterday is a British free-to-air television channel broadcasting in the United Kingdom and Ireland specialising in history, documentaries, and culture.

It launched on 30 October 2002 as UK History and relaunched in its current format on 2 March 2009. It is available on satellite through Sky, Freesat and through the digital terrestrial provider Freeview. Hours on Freeview had previously been cut, with transmissions finishing at 6 pm, but were restored on 1 June 2010.

== History ==
On 30 June 2002, UKTV announced the closure of Play UK at the end of the year, citing that the closure of ITV Digital was the reason for its demise. On 13 September, UKTV announced the closure of the channel would be moved forward to the end of September, and that to prepare for the launch of Freeview, the bandwidth space would be replaced with a new channel – UK History.

Play UK closed as planned at the end of September, and the following month on 30 October, the launch date for the Freeview platform itself, UK History launched, becoming an offshoot of UK Horizons with most of its factual and documentary programmes moving over; however, the launch of UK History allowed Horizons to broadcast more programmes in their schedule.

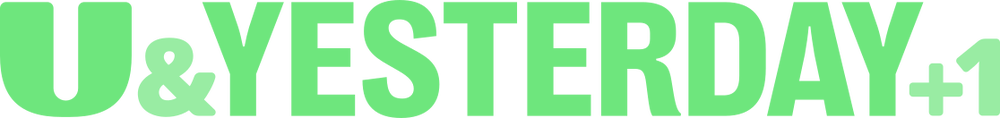
U&Yesterday+1 logo

On 28 January 2004, a timeshift service – UK History +1 was launched on Sky Digital. The channel broadcasts the UK History schedule one hour later than the main channel, but contains no special programming or branding, with the occasional exception of a different DOG. The channel launched on Telewest the following week on 4 February. On 8 March 2004, the channel's "UK" prefix was changed to the full "UKTV" name, renaming the networks as UKTV History and UKTV History +1, as with the rest of the UKTV network.

The channel was available full-time on all platforms until 15 October 2007 when the hours were reduced on the Freeview platform, resulting in the channel stopping broadcasting at 6 pm each day. This was a result of the launch of Dave, which took over UKTV History broadcast capacity. UKTV History took over the slot used by the unsuccessful UKTV Bright Ideas that was sharing a slot with Virgin1 and Babestation. The channel's inability to broadcast in prime time on Freeview resulted in a ratings drop. In November 2007, the channel had a 0.3 per cent share of all television viewing, compared to 0.5 per cent a year earlier.

As part of a network-wide programme of relaunching all the UKTV channels under unique names and brands, UKTV History and UKTV History +1 were renamed as Yesterday and Yesterday +1, respectively, on 2 March 2009. The new channel also took on extra programming including historical fact drama series and factual programmes previously broadcast on UKTV Documentary concerning the natural history of the British Isles.

On 1 June 2010, Yesterday reinstated its full broadcast hours on Freeview, following the closure of the Virgin1 +1 channel.

On 7 October 2011, Yesterday +1 was reinstated on Virgin Media.

On 24 July 2012, Yesterday offers more entertainment-led content along with a design refresh, which includes a new logo and idents, in order to attract a wider and younger audience, along with a new slogan, "Entertainment Inspired By History". For example, the channel has broadcast more repeats of situation comedies, such as Last of the Summer Wine or Butterflies. The network moved to channel 19 on 19 September 2012, swapping with sister channel Dave.

In late 2014, Yesterday began slowly decreasing the amount of comedy and drama shown on the channel and branching out into more factual content, with notable additions including natural history, science and engineering alongside the classic slate of history programming.

On 8 December 2015, Yesterday became available on Freesat together with two of its UKTV sister channels Drama and former sister channel, Really.

Yesterday +1 launched on Freeview channel 99 on 22 November 2018, but was removed on 16 January 2019.

On 10 June 2019, Yesterday moved to channel 25 on Freeview, a space previously occupied by its former sister channel Home, which Discovery, Inc. acquired along with Good Food and Really as part of a deal with its current owner BBC Studios.

Yesterday +1 returned on Freeview on channel 75 on 15 April 2020, with the channel moving up one slot, next to UKTV's newly acquired sister channel CCXTV, on 7 December 2020 (though channel 74 is only currently used for two hours of teleshopping a night rather than broadcasting any of Yesterday's programmes). On 4 November 2020, the channel moved to channel 26 as part of a move up where every channel from channel 24 to 54 on the platform moved up one place to allow BBC Four to move to channel 24 in Scotland due to new Ofcom rules regarding certain PSB channels requiring greater prominence on EPGs.

On 8 July 2022, test transmissions for the HD feed of Yesterday commenced, using the frequency 12226 H 27500 2/3 DVB-S2 8PSK. A month later, on 8 August 2022, Yesterday's HD feed officially launched on Sky Q and Sky HD channel 155 where it replaced the standard definition feed on the EPG. The HD feed was added to Virgin Media on 14 December 2022. The HD feed on Sky Q and Sky HD closed on 1 April 2025, though it will continue as normal on Sky Glass and Sky Stream.

On 16 July 2024, Yesterday and Yesterday +1 were renamed to U&Yesterday and U&Yesterday +1, respectively as part of a network wide rebrand with the "U" masterbrand.

On 16 October 2024, U&Yesterday +1 was replaced by U&Eden on Freeview.

== Former logos ==
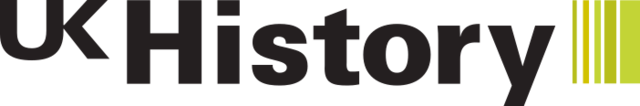
UK History logo used from 30 October 2002 to 7 March 2004

UKTV History logo used from 8 March 2004 to 1 March 2009

Yesterday logo used from 2 March 2009 to 23 July 2012

Yesterday logo used from 23 July 2012 to 16 July 2024

== Programming ==
The majority of the channel's programmes are sourced from the BBC programme archives; however, some are bought in from other terrestrial stations and some productions are commissioned by UKTV themselves. Programmes previously shown on terrestrial channels like BBC One, Two and Four are usually edited for timing, to accommodate the current three commercial breaks within each hour-long programme. The most obvious example of this is for programmes originally broadcast on the BBC, as material lasting 58 minutes will be edited down to 42 minutes when shown on U&Yesterday. Some of U&Yesterday's notable programmes include:

=== UKTV/U&Yesterday Originals ===
- Abandoned Engineering
- Bangers and Cash
- Bangers & Cash: Restoring Classics (a spin-off series featuring Derek, Paul and Dave Mathewson)
- Find It, Fix It, Flog It (previously shown on Channel 4)
- Great British Landmark Fixers
- Hornby: A Model World
- Railway Murders
- Retro Electro Workshop
- Restoration Workshop
- Secrets of the London Underground
- Secrets of the Transport Museum
- The Architecture the Railways Built
- True Evil: The Making of a Nazi
- War Factories

=== Programmes from the BBC and other broadcasters ===
- 'Allo 'Allo!
- Antiques Roadshow
- Auf Wiedersehen, Pet
- Bargain Hunt
- Battleplan
- Cash in the Attic
- Celebrity Antiques Road Trip
- Charles Darwin and the Tree of Life
- Chemistry: A Volatile History
- Coast
- The Dark Ages: An Age of Light
- David Attenborough's Life Collection
- Fawlty Towers: Re-Opened
- Find My Past
- Genius of Britain
- Goodnight Sweetheart
- Great British Railway Journeys
- Keeping Up Appearances
- Life in Cold Blood
- Museum Secrets
- Ocean Giants
- One Foot in the Grave
- The Queen's Sister
- The Re-Inventors
- Red Dwarf
- Secret History
- The Secret Life Of...
- Secrets of War
- Shock and Awe: The Story of Electricity
- The Sixties: The Beatles Decade
- Stonewall Uprising
- Open All Hours
- The Two Ronnies
- Porridge
- Time Team
- To the Manor Born
- Top Gear
- Treasure Detectives
- Walking Through History
- Whatever Happened to the Likely Lads?
- Wild Canada
- Wonders of the Solar System
- Wonders of the Universe
- The World at War
- Yes, Prime Minister

=== Previous ===
- 10 Things You Don't Know About
- Above and Beyond
- Africa
- All Creatures Great and Small
- Ancient Rome: The Rise and Fall of an Empire
- Andrew Marr's History of the World
- Animal House
- Atlantis: End of a World, Birth of a Legend
- Attenborough and the Giant Egg
- Auschwitz: The Nazis and 'The Final Solution'
- Australia with Simon Reeve
- Ballykissangel
- Bergerac
- The Best of Men
- Birdsong
- Blackadder
- The Blue Planet
- Bottom
- Boom Bang-a-Bang: 50 Years of Eurovision
- Brave New World with Stephen Hawking
- Brazil with Michael Palin
- The Challenger Disaster
- Countryfile
- The Country House Revealed
- The Courageous Heart of Irena Sendler
- David Attenborough's Natural Curiosities
- The Diamond Queen
- Dickinson's Real Deal
- Digging for Britain
- dinnerladies
- Earth: The Power of the Planet
- Edwardian Farm
- Egypt
- Empire
- Flog It!
- Frozen Planet
- Galápagos
- Ganges
- Great Barrier Reef
- Great British Ghosts
- The Great British Story: A People's History
- The Green Green Grass
- Hattie
- Have I Got News for You
- Hidden Kingdoms
- History Cold Case
- Hitler: The Rise of Evil
- Human Planet
- Ice Age Giants
- Inside Nature's Giants
- International Terrorism
- Island at War
- Japan: Earth's Enchanted Islands
- Jeeves and Wooster
- Kenneth Williams: Fantabulosa!
- King George and Queen Mary
- Krakatoa: The Last Days
- Land Girls
- The Last Day of World War One
- Last of the Summer Wine
- Life
- Life in the Undergrowth
- The Life of Birds
- The Life of Mammals
- Life on Earth
- Life on Fire
- The Lost Gods of Easter Island
- Lost Land of the Jaguar
- Lost Land of the Tiger
- Lost Land of the Volcano
- Lovejoy
- Madagascar
- Meet the Romans with Mary Beard
- Michael Wood's Story of England
- Miss Marple
- Mountain Gorilla
- Mummies Alive
- Museum of Life
- Mysteries at the Museum
- Nature's Great Events
- The Nazis: A Warning from History
- New Tricks
- Nuremberg
- Oceans
- The Old Grey Whistle Test: 70s Gold
- Only Fools and Horses
- Oz and Hugh Drink to Christmas
- Oz and James Drink to Britain
- Parade's End
- Planet Earth
- Pointless
- The Planets
- The Private Life of Plants
- The Queen's Palaces
- Rise of the Continents
- The Royle Family
- Sharpe
- The Sixties
- Steptoe and Son
- Tenko
- The Thin Blue Line
- Timewatch
- Timothy Spall: ...at Sea
- Top of the Pops
- TOWN with Nicholas Crane
- Treasures of Ancient Rome
- Victorian Farm
- Vikings
- Waiting For God
- The War
- Wartime Farm
- Wild Africa
- Wild Arabia
- Wild Caribbean
- Wild China
- Wild Colombia with Nigel Marven
- Who Do You Think You Are?
- Wonders of Life
- Yellowstone

== See also ==
- UKTV
- Television in the United Kingdom
