= UKTV =

Multi-channel broadcaster, subsidiary of the BBC

UKTV Media Limited
- Logo used since 2024
- Formerly: UKTV New Ventures Limited (2001–2014)
- Type: Subsidiary; (former joint venture)
- Industry: Mass media
- Founded: 1 November 1992; 34 years ago
- Founder: BBC Enterprises and Thames Television (UK Gold); BBC Worldwide and Flextech (UKTV)
- Headquarters: 10 Hammersmith Grove, London, England
- Area served: United Kingdom; Ireland
- Key people: Marcus Arthur (CEO)
- Products: U
- Brands: List of channels
- Services: Television; Online
- Parent: BBC Studios
- Website: corporate.uktv.co.uk

UKTV Media Limited, trading as UKTV, is a British multi-channel broadcaster, which, since 2019, has been wholly owned by BBC Studios (formerly BBC Worldwide), a commercial subsidiary of the BBC. It was formed on 1 November 1992 as a joint venture between the BBC and Thames Television. It is one of the United Kingdom's largest television companies.

UKTV's channels are available via a digital satellite or cable subscription in the UK and Ireland. The U&Dave, U&Drama, U&Eden, U&W and U&Yesterday channels are also available in the UK on Freeview and Freesat, two free-to-air television services in the UK, as well as on the catch-up service U. Unlike the BBC's main television channels, funded by the television licence, UKTV's channels and online services broadcast commercial advertising and sponsorships.

Although many programmes on the channels are repeat broadcasts of productions from the BBC archives, they also broadcast programmes produced by other companies and UKTV have commissioned original programmes, such as Dynamo: Magician Impossible, Taskmaster, Bangers & Cash and the newly rebooted series of Bergerac. Playout and other technical services are provided by SES.

The UKTV channels have broadcast in 16:9 widescreen format since 31 January 2008, although some programmes originally made in 4:3 format are screened in the compromise 14:9 semi-letterbox format.

== History ==
=== Origins (1992–1997) ===
UKTV started life as a single channel, UK Gold. The original partners behind the channel were the BBC's commercial arm BBC Enterprises and the outgoing ITV contractor Thames Television, although before the launch the American cable operator Cox Enterprises stepped in and took a majority share, 65 percent, in exchange for underwriting the costs of launching the channel.

UK Gold launched on 1 November 1992, showing reruns of 'classic' archive programming from the archives of the BBC and Thames Television. In a sense, UK Gold succeeded British Satellite Broadcasting's Galaxy channel that had originally held these rights from the BBC.

Later on, United Artists Holding Europe stepped in as part owner, and that ownership eventually became a part of Flextech, which was controlled by the US cable company TCI. A second joint-venture satellite channel, called UK Living, began broadcasting on 1 September 1993 with programming targeted at female viewers. Also in 1993, Flextech gained its first stake in the station after acquiring TCI's TV interests in Europe. In 1996, it started discussions about increasing its stake to gain full control; at that point, Flextech held 27% with Cox (38%), BBC (20%) and Pearson (15%). By the Autumn, Flextech held 80% of UK Gold. Flextech's main reason for increasing its stake in UK Gold was in anticipation of new talks with the BBC.

=== The launch of the UKTV network (1997) ===
During 1996, Flextech and the BBC held talks about a partnership to launch a new range of channels under the name UKTV. BSkyB tried to compete against Flextech for the right to develop the BBC channels, but the BBC were against inviting BSkyB to participate in the pay-TV venture. BSkyB would have sought a significant share in the planned channels, in exchange for agreeing to offer them to its 3.8 million direct-to-home satellite subscribers. It was believed at the time that if it were spurned, BSkyB could develop competing channels before the Flextech-BBC launch, particularly arts and documentaries, as a spoiling tactic.

The deal between Flextech and BBC was completed and signed in March 1997. Initially it was assumed that the new channels would be BBC-branded: BBC Showcase, for entertainment; BBC Horizon, for documentaries; BBC Style, for lifestyle; BBC Learning, for schools, and BBC Arena, for the arts, plus three other channels including BBC Catch-Up, for repeats of popular programmes within days of their original transmission, a dedicated BBC Sport channel, and a TV version of Radio 1. Flextech wanted these channels to carry advertisements, but the BBC argued that BBC-branded services in the UK should not, as doing so would undermine the rationale of TV licensing.

A compromise was reached: BBC Showcase and BBC Learning, renamed BBC Choice and BBC Knowledge respectively before launch, would go ahead as BBC channels without commercials, while the deal with Flextech was passed to BBC Worldwide with control split 50/50, thus allowing the remaining channels to carry advertisements. The 'UK' prefix was chosen for these new channels to capitalise on the success of UK Gold, as the brand by then had become a household name. The 'UKTV' network launched on 1 November 1997 with three new channels; arts channel 'UK Arena', lifestyle channel 'UK Style' and documentary channel 'UK Horizons'. UK Gold retained its name but received a new look in line with the rest of the network. Although the new network didn't use the BBC name and logo, its graphics and branding was in other aspects similar to those used by the BBC channels. The new graphics for the BBC and UKTV were both designed by the same company, Lambie-Nairn. Shortly before launch, it was decided the channel UK Living also owned by Flextech was to be renamed Living, instead of becoming part of the new UKTV network due to the similarity in programming between the channel and UK Style. On the same date, UK Gold celebrated its 5th anniversary.

=== Digital expansion (1998–2007) ===
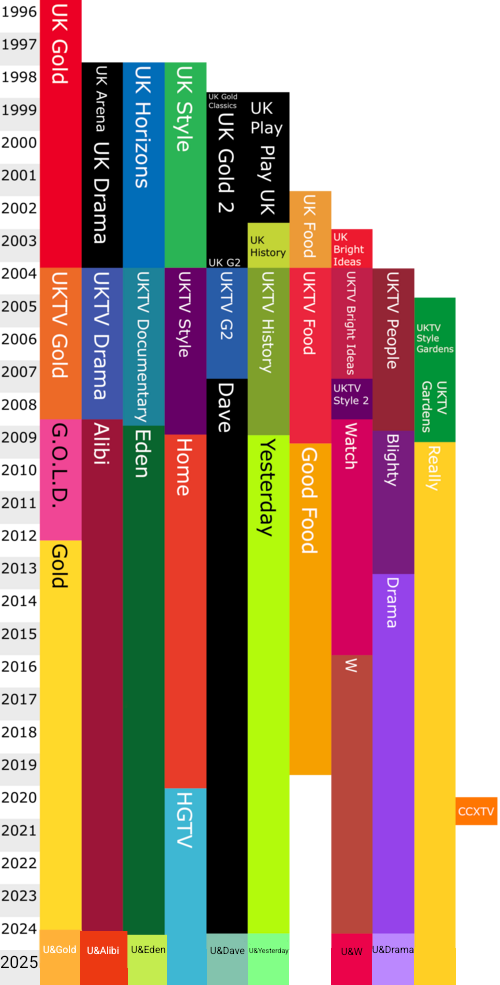
Chart of channels in different years.

With the launch of digital television in the UK brought about by Sky Digital and ONdigital in 1998, two new channels were launched to broadcast on the new platforms: 'UK Gold Classics', a sister channel to UK Gold showing older shows previously shown on UK Gold, and 'UK Play', a new comedy and music channel.

UK Gold Classics was short lived however, and relaunched as UK Gold 2 in April 1999. The new channel time-shifted the morning schedule of UK Gold from 7 pm for those who could not watch it at the original time.

To boost its popularity, UK Play was renamed Play UK and given a new look and new style of logo in November 2000, which the rest of the UKTV channels would adopt the following May. In November 2001, UK Style's food programming was moved to a new channel named 'UK Food'.

The rebranding of Play UK failed to make the channel more popular, and on 30 September 2002 it was shut down. October saw the launch of the new free-to-view digital terrestrial platform Freeview replacing ITV Digital, and with it the new history channel 'UK History', which was included in Freeview's licence to operate the platform. UK History took many of the history-related programming from UK Horizons. In January 2003, UKTV launched a lifestyle channel for Freeview called UK Bright Ideas. However UK Bright Ideas was not created for the same reasons as UK Food and UK History to allow other UKTV channels to have more time to schedule other programming, but instead showed a mix of programming from UK Style and UK Food (and later UKTV Gardens) for Freeview viewers, to promote the lifestyle UKTV channels available on pay platforms.

UK Gold 2 was relaunched with a completely new schedule and style as UKG^{2} on 12 November 2003, taking on some output similar to what used to be on Play UK before its closure, initially broadcasting from 8 pm each night before later expanding to daytime.

On 8 March 2004, the network carried out a major rebranding scheme where all of the UKTV channels changed their prefixes from UK to UKTV. UK Horizons was split into two channels – UKTV Documentary and UKTV People.

In 2005, the last new channel under the UKTV branding was launched, 'UKTV Style Gardens', later renamed in 2007 to 'UKTV Gardens'. Like UKTV Food, it allowed UKTV Style to focus more on its more home-oriented programming.

=== Network rebrand ===
UKTV logo from 2009 to 2013, not seen on screen like the previous and successor logos.

In 2007, UKTV G2 was renamed 'Dave' and began broadcasting on Freeview, replacing UKTV Bright Ideas, seen as an experiment in branding for the network. The name is said to be originated from the fact that "everyone knows a bloke called Dave", and that the name seems appropriate for a male-orientated channel.

On 11 June 2008, UKTV announced that it was beginning the process of rebranding its channels from generic, UKTV-prefixed names to individual and separate brands, after the successful launch of Dave.

The first stage of this rebranding began on 7 October 2008, when UKTV Gold was renamed G.O.L.D. (now U&Gold) and dropped its mixed entertainment schedule for pure comedy programming. UKTV Drama became the crime drama channel Alibi, and a new general entertainment channel called Watch (now U&W) was launched. It was with this rebrand that non-crime dramas (such as Doctor Who and Jonathan Creek) was transferred to Watch. G.O.L.D. was on one level a continuation of the Gold name used since the channel's creation, but the letters also made up the channels new slogan: 'Go On Laugh Daily'.

As the UKTV network gradually rebranded from 2008, continuity announcers would usually say on each network 'Created for the BBC, chosen by' when a programme by the BBC was coming on (e.g. 'Created for the BBC, chosen by G.O.L.D.').

2009 saw the rebranding of all of the remaining channels beginning in January with UKTV Documentary's rebrand to Eden, the name reflecting the nature programmes premiering on the channel. This was followed in February with UKTV People becoming Blighty, the new channel containing programming of the lives of the British population and the quirks of British society, and therefore explaining the slang name for Britain as the channel name. In March, UKTV History was rebranded as Yesterday, reflecting the channel's history-themed programming.

This was closely followed in April by the re-brand of UKTV Style to Home, the new channel retaining the previous DIY shows and home makeovers and also including the programming from UKTV Gardens; however, this programming would follow a few weeks later in May, when UKTV Gardens was closed. Its channel slot was taken by Really, a new female crime medical and real life channel, similar to Virgin Media's then-named Living.

The final channel to be rebranded was UKTV Food, on 22 June 2009 as Good Food, to tie in with the BBC magazine of the same name. In June 2009, a final major tweak to these new brands occurred when, for promotional purposes, trailers began to use the same style and all channels began to use a circle-shaped variation of their logo to show that they were part of one network, making cross-channel promotion easier than previously.

On 14 June 2011, UKTV announced it would be launching Really on Freeview channel 20 on 2 August 2011. This resulted in the timeshift channel Dave ja vu broadcasting reduced hours of 02:00‍–‍04:00 on Freeview only to keep the EPG number available for future use. Really was the third of UKTV's ten brands to launch on Freeview.

=== Scripps Networks Interactive acquisition ===
Virgin Media were in talks, with a number of interested parties, to sell its 50% stake in UKTV. Bidders included Scripps Networks Interactive (a spin-off of the E. W. Scripps Company's cable television networks and online assets), Discovery Communications, ITV and Channel 4. Channel 4 was the least interested party, and Discovery had made offers that had been rejected. BSkyB was also said to be interested. BBC Worldwide held first refusal rights and could exercise control over who bought the stake.

On 15 August 2011, Virgin Media agreed to sell its 50% stake in UKTV to Scripps Networks Interactive in a deal worth £339m. Scripps paid £239m in cash, and about £100m to acquire the outstanding preferred stock and debt owed by UKTV to Virgin Media. Completion of the transaction was contingent on regulatory approvals in Ireland and Jersey, which was received on 3 October 2011. Related to the transaction, Scripps Networks Interactive and BBC Worldwide negotiated an agreement whereby, after completion, BBC Worldwide would have the option, via a combination of cash and a package of digital rights for UKTV, to increase its shareholding from 50 percent to a maximum of 60 percent. Scripps Networks Interactive's existing voting rights and board representation would be unaffected by this proposed arrangement, which would be subject to BBC Executive and BBC Trust approvals.

=== BT Vision deal ===
On 22 March 2012, it was announced that BT Vision would offer UKTV original content on‑demand from later in the day. As part of the deal, UKTV started streaming linear channels to BT Vision set-top boxes in late 2012. The first three were Watch, Gold and Alibi and it intended to add further channels such as Good Food, Eden and Home. Dave, Really and Yesterday were not expected to be included as they are already on Freeview, which is available through BT's hybrid IPTV/Freeview set-top boxes.

=== Corporate rebrand (2013) ===
UKTV logo used from 2013 to 2024

UKTV announced on 18 March 2013 that it would reintroduce its company brand in celebration of its 21st year. The UKTV logo redesign went live across the identities of their channel network and programmes on Tuesday 26 March 2013 for its 21st birthday.

=== Dispute with Virgin Media ===
For almost three weeks in summer 2018, the UKTV channels were absent from Virgin Media. On 20 July 2018, it was announced that Virgin Media would stop broadcasting all of the UKTV channels from 22 July, amid a dispute over fees and the lack of on-demand content from the BBC. The companies were not able to agree terms and the channels ceased to be available at just after midnight on 22 July 2018. The channels returned to Virgin Media on 11 August 2018.

=== Split of channels between BBC and Discovery ===
On 1 April 2019, Discovery (formerly Discovery Communications, which had acquired Scripps Networks Interactive in 2018) announced that BBC Studios would acquire its stakes in the seven entertainment-based UKTV channels for £173 million, along with the UKTV brand, and Discovery would acquire BBC Studios' stakes in the remaining channels Good Food, Home and Really. The sale closed on 11 June 2019. The sale was part of a larger agreement between the two companies for international streaming rights to the BBC's natural history programming.

=== Corporate rebrand (2024) and the launch of "U" masterbrand ===
In November 2023, it was announced that in summer 2024, all of UKTV's free-to-air channels and UKTV Play would be rebranded with the new name of "U", with the free-to-air channels Dave, Drama, Yesterday and W becoming "U&Dave", "U&Drama", "U&Yesterday", and "U&W" respectively. All four channels were rebranded on 16 July. UKTV rebranded their pay channels to "U&Gold" and "U&Alibi" on 7 November, and "U&Eden" became a free-to-air channel on 7 October, and rebranded on 16 October. The "U" masterbrand made all of their channels be "U"nited under the "U" brand. In early July 2024, UKTV started to roll out a similar logo to its "U" masterbrand. The logo can be found on the corporate website and on "U" (UKTV Play). The rebrand was completed on 7 November 2024 with the addition of "U&GOLD" and "U&alibi", uniting the entire network under the "U" brand.

== Marketing ==
In 2003, UKTV announced plans of an experiment which examined the effect of different break patterns on advertising. UKTV teamed up with a number of advertisers to measure the effect of reductions in advertising spots, programme trailers and the number of breaks overall.

In February 2004, UKTV reduced the length of its advertising breaks in a bid to retain viewers and attract advertisers after results of its research show that shorter breaks produce higher advertising recall levels. From 8 March, interruptions were limited to a maximum of five minutes, with three-and-a-half minutes of commercial plus one-and-a-half minutes of promotional material, instead of a standard seven-and-a-half minutes.

UKTV's move was similar to a solution suggested by PHD executive strategy director Louise Jones at 2003 Marketing Week TV United Conference, with a view to cleaning up breaks. Her proposal was for broadcasters to reduce spots by 20 per cent and to charge a corresponding price increase for them; the theory being clients would not have to boost their media spending, thus improving UKTV hopes a reduction in the length of break junctions would help it to keep viewers and provide advertisers with improved cut-through.

== Channels ==
UKTV's channels are available via satellite and cable in Ireland and the United Kingdom. In the UK, on digital terrestrial television, U&Yesterday, U&Dave, U&Drama, U&W and U&Eden are available on the Freeview platform. Selected parts of U&Gold, Home and Good Food were available through the now defunct Top Up TV service. The logo on the UKTV branded channels has also now been replaced by a new design.

=== Current free-to-air channels ===
UKTV's free-to-air channels are available on all platforms.

==== U&Dave ====
U&Dave logo used since 2024

U&Dave is a comedy-oriented entertainment channel. The channel originally came together after UK Gold 2, an evening timeshift service of UK Gold, was reinvented to aim towards a more younger 16–34-year-old audience and was relaunched as UK G2 on 12 November 2003, becoming the more "edgy and contemporary" counterpart to UK Gold. As with its predecessor, UK G2 only broadcast at night, from 8 pm to 5 am. It later rebranded as UKTV G2 in March 2004, and soon expanded its hours to the daytime as well.

On 15 October 2007, UKTV G2 rebranded as Dave, becoming the first in the network not to use UKTV or any UK branding. UKTV said the name of the channel was chosen because "everyone knows a bloke called Dave". The rebrand included the channel being available free-to-air on Freeview, replacing UKTV Bright Ideas which only averaged a 0.1% audience share. The move to Freeview saw Dave launch in the bandwidth previously used by Yesterday (previously known as UKTV History).

In October 2017, Dave briefly rebranded to Rupert as part of a commercial partnership with Snickers.

On 16 July 2024, Dave was renamed U&Dave.

U&Dave currently broadcasts on channel 19 on Freeview and channel 157 on Freesat.

==== U&Drama ====
U&Drama logo used since 2024

Launched on 8 July 2013, U&Drama focuses itself as a home for British dramas from the last 40 years. The channel became the fourth channel to launch on Freeview, after Yesterday, Dave and Really.

On 16 July 2024, Drama was renamed U&Drama.

U&Drama currently broadcasts on channel 20 on Freeview and channel 158 on Freesat.

==== U&W ====
U&W logo used since 2024

U&W is a general entertainment channel, and the flagship channel. The channel launched as Watch on 7 October 2008. From launch until 2010, the channel's mascot was Blinky the eyeball, who was seen on the idents, logo, and website. A 2012 rebrand saw smoke, hairballs, crystals and liquid flying out of the logo. The channel was later rebranded as W in February 2016.

In February 2022, Broadcast magazine reported that the channel will become a free channel to air in the spring, joining stablemates Dave, Yesterday and Drama as a Freeview service. In March 2022, this was confirmed by UKTV with the channel due to be launched on Freeview channel 25 from 28 March 2022. UKTV said that this female skewing channel would be still targeted at a 25 to 44 age range but introduced a new logo for the free-to-air era, which included the letter W in a slanted rectangle.

On 16 July 2024, W was renamed U&W.

U&W currently broadcasts on channel 25 on Freeview and channel 156 on Freesat.

==== U&Yesterday ====
U&Yesterday logo used since 2024

U&Yesterday focuses on history and archive programmes. It originally launched on 30 October 2002 as UK History, as part of the launch of Freeview, and was broadcast on the same EPG bandwidth that formerly housed Play UK. The channel rebranded as UKTV History in March 2004. Hours on Freeview were cut when Dave launched, with transmissions finishing at 6 pm, but were restored on 1 June 2010.

The channel relaunched as Yesterday in March 2009. Yesterday's main focus is (as of May 2024) on programmes with historical topics and biographies, nature and wildlife, some comedy, and some historical fact drama series, often from the BBC archives.

On 16 July 2024, Yesterday was renamed U&Yesterday.

U&Yesterday currently broadcasts on channel 27 on Freeview and channel 159 on Freesat.

==== U&Eden ====
U&Eden logo used since 2024

U&Eden focuses on documentaries and factual programming. The channel launched on 8 March 2004 as UKTV Documentary, as a two-way split from UK Horizons (the other being the defunct UKTV People (Blighty). The channel originally aired natural history documentaries such as Planet Earth, but mid‑2024 saw its output also start to cover other factual and reality programming although natural history programming is still part of the channel's output.

On 16 October 2024, Eden was renamed U&Eden and became a free-to-air channel.

=== Current pay-TV channels ===
UKTV's pay-TV channels are available on Sky and Virgin Media, but not Freeview or Freesat.

==== U&Gold ====
U&Gold logo used since 2024

U&Gold focuses on comedy and was, until 2008, the flagship channel of the UKTV network. It launched on 1 November 1992 as UK Gold, making it the oldest channel of the network as well.

UK Gold originally operated as a joint venture between Thames Television and BBC Enterprises to show reruns of their archive programming. Within the launch of the UKTV network and as the years went on, the output of UK Gold (renamed UKTV Gold in 2004) was mainly British comedy programmes and sometimes feature-length films. These are a combination of internally produced shows and repeats of shows from the BBC and ITV archives. In recent years, original programmes have aired on the channel and the American version of Dancing with the Stars has had its first UK airing on the channel.

UKTV Gold was relaunched as GOLD (Go On Laugh Daily) on the morning of 7 October 2008 as it transitioned exclusively to comedy programmes, with the entertainment programming moving to Watch (U&W). The channel rebranded again to simply Gold in 2010.

The channel rebranded to U&Gold on 7 November 2024.

==== U&Alibi ====
U&Alibi logo used since 2024

U&Alibi focuses on crime drama and suspense thrillers. It originally launched as a rebranding of UK Arena as UK Drama in March 2000, focusing on all kinds of drama programmes. It rebranded as UKTV Drama in March 2004, and on 2 May 2006, a new timeshift service called UKTV Drama +1 was launched, to replace UKTV People's timeshift channel. (UKTV People +1)

It was relaunched as Alibi on the morning of 7 October 2008 and is now fully focused on crime dramas which are mainly taken from the BBC and ITV archives.

The channel was named U&Alibi on 7 November 2024.

=== Catch-up service ===
U logo used since 2024

In June 2014, UKTV announced a catch-up service, UKTV Play. It launched on iOS in August, on PC, YouView and Virgin Media in November, on Android devices in February 2015 and on Freesat in September 2018. The interactive service features content from the channels Dave, Yesterday, W, and Drama.

In addition to UKTV Play, some of the networks also have catch-up services. Catch-up services for Watch, Gold, Dave and Alibi were launched on Sky Go in October 2013, alongside all UKTV channels launching on Eircom's eVision TV service and Gold launching on Now TV. The following month, all channels appeared on Virgin TV Anywhere.

In November 2023, UKTV announced that UKTV Play would be renamed U as a part of a rebrand of the UKTV network. UKTV Play rebranded to U on 16 July 2024.

=== FAST channels ===
On 24 August 2023, UKTV launched four FAST channels on Samsung TV Plus and Pluto TV: UKTV Play Uncovered, UKTV Play Heroes, UKTV Play Laughs and UKTV Play Full Throttle.

Due to the "U" masterbrand in 2024, UKTV Play Uncovered, UKTV Play Heroes, UKTV Play Laughs and UKTV Play Full Throttle have been renamed U&The Past, U&Real Heroes, U&Laughs and U&Transport, respectively.

=== Former channels ===
UKTV has also had many former channels which have been replaced by others, shut down or acquired by other companies.

==== UK Arena ====
UK Arena was one of the original three UKTV network channels, launching on 1 November 1997. The channel focused on airing arts and cultural programmes and was named after BBC's Arena programme.

The channel was relaunched on 31 March 2000 as UK Drama (now U&Alibi) with a focus on showing dramas rather than general arts programmes.

==== Play UK ====
Play UK logo used from 2000 to 2002

Play UK focused heavily on music and comedy programming, and was the first of the UKTV networks to initially launch digitally (and also to coincide with the launch of OnDigital [later ITV Digital]). It launched as UK Play on 10 October 1998 alongside the launch of Sky Digital, with a majority of its scheduling consisting of music in the morning and afternoon while broadcasting comedy in the evening. The channel rebranded as Play UK in November 2000, becoming the first of the UKTV networks to gain the new logo.

The channel broadcast for 24 hours a day on digital platforms, but also aired as a filler channel on the Sky Analogue platform (on the Astra 19.2°E satellites), broadcasting between 1 am and 7 am within UK Horizons' slot during its downtime.

The closure of ITV Digital led to the channel's viewership decreasing significantly, and its failure to compete with MTV also corresponded to its decline. The channel closed on 30 September 2002 on all platforms, and a month later on 30 October, its vacated EPG bandwidth space was used to launch a brand new channel for the launch of the Freeview platform – UK History. The programmes that formerly aired on Play UK would move to UK Gold, and eventually UK G2.

==== UK Gold Classics/UK Gold 2 ====
UK Gold Classics was a sister channel to UK Gold that broadcast older comedy programming, as the main UK Gold channel was focusing more on newer shows. It launched on 10 October 1998 and was exclusive to Sky Digital.

Due to poor viewing figures, the channel ended its run on 28 March 1999, and on 2 April 1999, it was relaunched as UK Gold 2, becoming a secondary timeshift service for UK Gold that aired the channel's daytime programming in the evening.

The channel closed on 11 November 2003, and relaunched as the younger-oriented and edgier UK G2 the following day.

==== UK Horizons ====
UK Horizons logo used from 1997 to 2001

UK Horizons was one of the original three UKTV network channels, launching on 1 November 1997. The channel focused on airing documentaries and other factual programmes and was named after BBC's Horizon programme, which itself formed a staple of its output in the early years. It also produced extended versions of top BBC brands such as Top Gear and Tomorrow's World. The launch editor was Bryher Scudamore and the deputy editor was Eddie Tulasiewicz.

The channel closed on 7 March 2004, as part of UKTV's relaunch. UK Horizons was split into two new channels – UKTV Documentary and UKTV People, which both launched the following day on 8 March. UKTV Documentary took over UK Horizons' slot, as well as the UK Horizons +1 timeshift service, with UKTV People being the "new" channel.

==== UKTV Bright Ideas ====
UKTV Bright Ideas logo used from 2004 to 2007

UKTV Bright Ideas originally launched as UK Bright Ideas on 15 January 2003, initially as a Freeview exclusive before being expanded.

Similar to Ftn, the channel it timeshared with, UK Bright Ideas was essentially a highlights network aimed towards the Freeview audience, by airing programmes featured on UKTV Style, UKTV Food and UKTV Gardens. In January 2005, it began showing programmes branded by UKTV Sport, presumably to increase potential audience figures by extending the programme to Freeview viewers.

It ceased broadcasting on all platforms on 14 October 2007 at 6 pm. The main aim for the closure was to coincide of the rebranding of UKTV G2 as Dave, which would allow the channel to broadcast on Freeview. It would also allow Dave's timeshift service to expand to 24 hours, which it wasn't able to do as UKTV G2, due to Bright Ideas sharing the same EPG bandwidth on Sky and Virgin Media. The former EPG slot on Sky was later used for a filler network UKTV Style +2.

==== UKTV Gardens ====
UKTV Gardens logo used from 2007 to 2009

UKTV Gardens was the second offshoot network of UKTV Style, and launched on 23 February 2005 as UKTV Style Gardens. As the name implies, the channel aired programmes in relation to gardening. The channel name was shortened to UKTV Gardens in 2007.

On 19 May 2009, the channel was replaced with Really, with all the gardening programmes moving back to the newly rebranded Home.

==== Blighty ====
Blighty was a factual network that originally launched on 8 March 2004 as UKTV People, as a two-way split from UK Horizons (the other being UKTV Documentary, now U&Eden). The output of Blighty was some factual programming of a lighter nature, such as Top Gear and docusoaps like Airport, and from February 2009 following its rebranding, "British" shows like My Brilliant Britain. However, the majority of the channel's programming was abridged by the BBC for commercial timing purposes, a policy that some critics consider hypocritical.

The channel was available on Sky and Virgin Media. However, it was not available on Freeview, despite the majority of the programmes being made by the BBC.

The channel closed on all platforms on 5 July 2013, three days ahead of the launch of Drama.

==== Good Food ====
The final Good Food logo, used before the Discovery acquisition

Good Food focused on food and cookery programming. It originally launched on 1 November 2001 as UK Food, as the first offshoot network of UK Style. It rebranded as UKTV Food in March 2004, and eventually as Good Food in June 2009, being the last UKTV channel to rebrand.

Good Food broadcast a range of food and cookery programmes, similar to that of the content of BBC Worldwide's BBC Food service. Initially, most of the channel's output was aired on Home as well. The Good Food website originally devised and launched by Ian Fenn and Ally Branley provides a number of services including information on programmes shown on the channel, recipes, message boards, and a wine club. Recipes come from the various shows on Good Food and some include videos taken from the demonstrations. In September 2006, Good Food's website overtook the BBC Food site in popularity for the first time, achieving a 10% market share, against the 9.63% the BBC Food site dropped to, having held the top spot since it began. It was named "Good Food Channel" on the UKTV website due to the fact that there is a magazine named Good Food.

Following the split of the UKTV network from BBC Studios and Discovery on 1 April 2019, Discovery took over control of Good Food, but they eventually closed the channel a few months later on 12 September, merging all its programming into their existing sister channel Food Network.

==== Home ====
The final Home logo, used before the channel changed its name to HGTV

Home was one of the original three UKTV network channels, launching on 1 November 1997 as UK Style. The channel broadcast home improvement, food, DIY and gardening programmes that are a combination of internally produced shows and repeats of shows mainly from the BBC archive. Eventually, the food programmes were moved onto an offshoot network named UK Food (Good Food) in November 2001, and the gardening programmes followed suit onto UKTV Style Gardens in February 2005. It was rebranded as UKTV Style in March 2004, and eventually the channel was rebranded as Home in April 2009.

On 1 March 2016, Home became a free-to-air network as it launched on Freeview.

Following the split of the UKTV network from BBC Studios and Discovery on 1 April 2019, Discovery took over control of Home, and in June, Discovery announced that the channel would be rebranded under their HGTV brand, with the channel rebranding as such on 21 January 2020.

Eventually, Warner Bros. Discovery closed HGTV on 13th January 2026, nearly six years after its rebrand from Home. HGTV's former programming moved to Really and its channel slot on Freeview and Freesat was taken by TLC.

==== Really ====
The Really logo, still used after the Discovery buyout

Really focuses entirely on medical crime, real life and lifestyle shows and was another offshoot from UKTV Style. It launched on 19 May 2009, replacing UKTV Gardens.

Following the split of the UKTV network from BBC Studios and Discovery on 1 April 2019, Discovery took over control of Really.

==== CCXTV ====
In October 2020, UKTV Media took over the licence of the Freeview channel CCXTV, a channel which had been set up by Ideal Shopping Direct Ltd as a sister channel to their Create and Craft shopping channel. CCXTV was launched on 15 April 2020 as an entertainment channel and took over Create and Craft's channel number (Freeview 23), broadcasting from 7 am until 10 pm. Even though Create and Craft still had a shopping slot early on in the morning on Channel 23, the rest of the schedule was made up of imports and re-runs of shows like The Bold and The Beautiful. On 7 December 2020, CCXTV moved to Freeview channel 73, with Dave Ja Vu moving to channel 23.

On 25 January 2021, it was announced that timeshift channel Drama+1 would be taking over Freeview channel 73 on 1 February 2021, with CCXTV ending transmission.

==== UK Living ====
UK Living was originally affiliated with UK Gold but did not become part of the UKTV network, instead transferring to Flextech to be operated as a wholly owned company, and it changed its name to Living before the UKTV network launched.

==== GoldText ====
An analogue teletext service known as GoldText was available on UK Gold, but has since closed down.

=== Operating names ===
In the production logo screen at the end of UKTV's original commissions, for the channels Watch, Gold and Dave the name UK Gold Services Ltd. is used instead of UKTV, as all three channels spawned from the original UK Gold channel. For the remaining channels, Alibi, Drama, Eden and Yesterday, the name UKTV New Ventures is used instead of UKTV.

=== Timeshift channels ===
UKTV launched its first one-hour timeshift network – UK Horizons +1 Hour (U&Eden +1), in May 2001. This was followed up with the launch of UK Style + (HGTV +1) in February 2002, and UK Gold +1 (U&Gold +1) in August 2002.

November 2003 saw the launch of UK Food +1 (Good Food +1), while 2004 saw the additions of UK History +1 (U&Yesterday +1) in January, and UKTV G2 +1 (U&Dave Ja Vu) in November.

2005 saw the addition of UKTV People +1, which was closed the following year and replaced with UKTV Drama +1 (U&Alibi +1) in May 2006.

December 2007 saw the launch of UKTV Style 2 (U&W) on Sky, a two-hour timeshift service that existed as a filler network whenever UKTV needed the space for another channel. It closed on 15 September 2008, in order to prepare for the launch of Watch.

Watch +1 (U&W +1) launched with the channel on 7 October 2008.

Drama +1 (U&Drama +1) launched on 16 September 2019.

=== HD channels ===
UKTV launched its first HD channel; Good Food HD on 31 August 2010. The channel was originally available exclusively on Sky channel 283.

Eden HD launched on 4 October 2010 on Sky channel 559 and was the second HD simulcast from UKTV. Both channels are high-definition simulcasts of their standard definition counterparts.

UKTV announced on 29 July 2011 that they would be launching three new HD channels, Dave HD and Watch HD (then known as W HD and now U&W HD) launched in October 2011, and U&Alibi HD launched in July 2012.

As part of Virgin Media's deal to sell its share of UKTV, all five of UKTV's HD channels were also added to Virgin's cable television service by 2012. Eden HD and Good Food HD were added on 7 October 2011, followed by Dave HD (now U&Dave HD) on 10 October and Watch HD on 12 October.

On 2 October 2017, UKTV launched U&Gold HD, replacing Eden HD on Sky. It was soon added to Virgin Media in August 2018, replacing the SD feed.

2022 saw Yesterday HD (now U&Yesterday HD) launch on Sky in August and Virgin Media in December.

== Awards and nominations ==
Year	Association	Category	Nominee(s)	Result
2017	Diversity in Media Awards	Broadcaster of the Year	UKTV	Won

== See also ==
- BBC Studios
