= Dog Borstal =

BBC Television series

Dog Borstal is a BBC series produced from 6 March 2006 to 9 December 2008, where three dog trainers dealt with particularly poorly-behaved dogs. It was directed by Jacqui Farnham and Carolyn Davies, and starred, among others, Lynne Davis, Mic Martin, Eleanor Graham, and Guy Oliver-Watts.
