= HGTV (UK & Ireland) =

British television channel, 1997–2026

- Final logo as HGTV, used from 2020 to 2026
- Country: United Kingdom
- Broadcast area: United Kingdom, Republic of Ireland

Programming
- Picture format: 576i SDTV
- Timeshift service: HGTV +1; UKTV Style +2 (defunct)

Ownership
- Owner: UKTV (1997–2019); Discovery, Inc. (2019–2022); Warner Bros. Discovery EMEA (2022–2026)
- Sister channels: Animal Planet; Boomerang; Cartoon Network; Cartoonito; CNN International; Discovery Channel; Discovery History; Discovery Science; Discovery Turbo; DMAX; Food Network; Investigation Discovery; Quest; Quest Red; Really; TLC

History
- Launched: 1 November 1997; 28 years ago
- Closed: 13 January 2026; 7 months ago
- Replaced by: Really (on Freeview and Sky); Moved to Really (on Sky Glass and Sky Stream)
- Former names: UK Style (1997–2004); UKTV Style (2004–2009); Home (2009–2020)

Links
- Website: HGTV (at the Wayback Machine)

Availability

Terrestrial
- See separate section

Streaming media
- See separate section

HGTV (formerly Home) was a British free-to-air interior home and garden-orientated lifestyle television channel broadcasting in the United Kingdom and Ireland, owned by Warner Bros. Discovery. The channel originally launched on 1 November 1997 as UK Style, and then was rebranded Home on 30 April 2009, and was rebranded to its final form on 21 January 2020. HGTV was broadcast 24 hours a day on Sky.

UK Style was transmitted by terrestrial provider ITV Digital 24 hours a day until the company's collapse in 2002. After a slight rebrand to UKTV Style, the channel returned to terrestrial television for a time in the mid-2000s as part of the now-defunct Top Up TV system. Before 2016, Home was a pay channel. Home became available as a free-to-air linear service on Freeview from 1 March 2016.

The channel closed on 13 January 2026, with its programming moving to Really and its channel slot on Freeview being replaced by a new generalist version of TLC.

== History ==
The channel originally launched on 1 November 1997 as UK Style, broadcasting lifestyle programming from the archive of the BBC and from external producers. The channel was launched as part of the initial creation of the UKTV network, following the success of sister channel UK Gold. The channel broadcast 24 hours a day on analogue cable, while it initially shared a transponder with its sister channels on Astra satellite.

UK Style was one of the launch channels on the OnDigital service in November 1998, sharing a slot with UK Horizons. Prior to this, it was one of the launch networks on Sky Digital, allowing satellite viewers to view the network at any time.

The channel rebranded alongside all the other UKTV networks on 8 May 2001. Further on, the channel's success was noted when it was announced that a new spin-off network, UK Food, was announced on 11 July 2001. The channel launched on 5 November of that year, allowing UK Style to focus more on lifestyle programming.

On 1 February 2002, UKTV announced UK Style +, a timeshift service, which launched on Sky Digital on 11 February 2002, initially airing from 8:00 am to 6:00 pm and timesharing with UK Gold 2. A week later, UK Style + launched on Telewest with UK Horizons +1, where they timeshared with each other on the platform. and on 29 May, launched on NTL as well.

In January 2003, another new channel called UK Bright Ideas was created to showcase programming from UK Style and UK Food on the digital terrestrial network Freeview. This was later extended to all networks, allowing repeats of some programmes to air on this channel only. On 7 July, UK Style + extended broadcast hours to end at 2:00 am.

On 8 March 2004, in line with the rest of the UKTV network, UK Style and UK Style + were renamed UKTV Style and UKTV Style +1.

In January 2005, another sister network was announced, UKTV Style Gardens, moving all the landscape and gardening programmes over to the new channel. The channel launched on 21 February 2005 on Sky and Telewest. The channel was added to NTL in May 2005, as part of a new carriage deal between Flextech and NTL. The channel name was later shortened to UKTV Gardens in 2007.

In December 2007, a two-hour timeshift service, UKTV Style +2, was launched on Sky, using UKTV Bright Ideas' former slot. The temporary service was closed on 15 September 2008, and was replaced by Watch.

On 24 March 2009, as part of the rebranding of UKTV's channels to unique names and identities, it was announced that UKTV Style would be rebranded as Home on 30 April 2009, and reposition itself to include programming based around home improvement, gardens and home lifestyle programmes. Other female lifestyle programmes were transferred to newly created channel Really, and all gardening programmes were transferred from UKTV Gardens to Home as part of the rebrand.

On 1 April 2019, it was announced that UKTV co-owner Discovery, Inc. would acquire the BBC's stake in Home.

In June 2019, Discovery announced that Home would be rebranded as a local version of the American channel of the same name, this occurred on 21 January 2020, the first programme to air on HGTV was Homes Under the Hammer at 7 am.

HGTV closed at midnight on 13 January 2026, with a loop of promos redirecting viewers to Really, along with its Freeview replacement of TLC, which was re-imaged as a generalist channel.

== On-air identity ==
UKTV Style logo

The channel's original identity revolved around the screen split in half horizontally with two objects coming together to form one object. Examples of these idents include an ornament added on top of a flower and still retains that image, wine pouring into a glass, with the base of glass formed out of pouring paint from a tin and a boater hat forming the bowl for some strawberries and cream. These idents were accompanied by a logo consisting of "UK" inside a box and the channel name "Style" written after on a line in upper case. The channel also had a digital on-screen graphic (DOG) of the same logo.

During July 2002, the channel relaunched in image along with the rest of the UKTV network. The box and line logos were replaced with the channel name stylised ^{UK} Style with a four-box pattern positioned to the right of the logo. This style had been adopted by the majority of the UKTV channels, with each channel's symbol representing the idents simplified and the channel focus in some ways. The boxes were arranged with one rectangle down the left-hand side, one running along the top half of the screen, a third in the centre bottom and a fourth in the bottom right corner. This arrangement was also reflected in the relaunched idents in 2001, with a different image in each section of the four-part arrangement. The idents were changed again in January 2003, with the same pattern used again. This time the pattern would appear integrated within the neutrally coloured home space, occasionally in shades of red and yellow. The pattern against the logo was also changed to shades of red and yellow at this time.

With the rebrand to UKTV Style, the idents changed to a neutrally coloured house interior and occupiers, which when looked through a mirror is improved and brightly coloured. However, this was replaced in 2006, to a stream of purple moving across the screen. In both cases, the double lined UKTV Style logo would be aligned to the left of the screen. Then in 2007, the idents were changed to a new set featuring people painting or dancing in front of the purple background while their silhouette opens up showing pictures of various lifestyles before it closes back, followed by the UKTV Style logo. The channel also adopted purple as the channel's colour at the same time, and three different shades of the colour would appear at the ending of promotions for programmes on the channel and for promotions for the channel on the UKTV network itself.

Home logo

Following the rebrand to Home, the idents featured a virtual tour of a home of varying sorts, with various features pointed out by text, usually of a comical nature. These included identifying the pet cat as "5th Flatmate", dirt on the floor as "Old carpet, new mud", a carpet as a "trip hazard", some old suitcases as the "DVD cabinet" and an ornament having "survived 3 moves and 2 extensions". The home logo outside of the circle then forms up over the centre of the scene. Scenes from homes were also used in promotion graphics and "stings" which showed the channel name during advert breaks.

Home was rebranded as HGTV on 21 January 2020.

== Availability ==
=== Cable ===
- Virgin Media UK: Channel 191 and Channel 391 (+1)
- Virgin Media Ireland: Channel 209

=== Online ===
- Discovery+ UK and Ireland: Watch live

=== Satellite ===
- Freesat UK: Channel 166 and Manual (+1)
- Sky UK: Channel 158 and Channel 258 (+1)
- Sky Ireland: Channel 162 and Channel 262 (+1)

=== Terrestrial ===
- Freeview UK: Channel 44

== Programming ==
The output of the channel shows lifestyle programmes, mainly gardening, home improvements and DIY shows, that were a combination of internally produced shows, repeats of shows from the BBC archive and international imports. Notable shows include:

- 60 Minute Makeover
- Anthea Turner: Perfect Housewife
- Antiques Road Trip
- Antiques Roadshow
- Axe the Agent?
- Bargain Hunt
- Bargain Hunt Famous Finds
- Bath Crashers
- Beeny's Restoration Nightmare
- The Block
- Britain's Dream Homes
- Britain's Ugliest Rooms
- Buy It, Sell It, Bank It?
- Buying the View
- Car Booty
- Cash in the Attic
- Celebrity DIY with Craig Phillips
- Celebrity Fantasy Homes
- Celebrity Storage Hunters
- Changing Rooms
- The City Gardener
- Colin and Justin's Home Heist
- Colin and Justin's Home Show
- Cowboy Trap
- Cracking Antiques
- Deadline Design with Shaynna Blaze
- Design Challenge
- Design ER
- Design Star
- Designs for Life
- Digging for Victory
- Disaster House
- DIY SOS
- DIY SOS: The Big Build
- DIY with Philippa
- Domestic Blitz
- Double Your House for Half the Money
- Dream Gardens
- Escape to the Country
- Extreme Makeover: Home Edition
- Fantasy Homes by the Sea
- Fantasy Homes Down Under
- Fantasy Homes in the City
- First Homes
- Fixer Upper
- Flipping Out
- Flog It!
- Fly to Buy
- Four in a Bed
- From House to Home
- Front of House
- Garden Invaders
- Garden Rivals
- Garden SOS
- Gardens By Appointment
- Gardens Unplugged
- Geoff Hamilton: A Man and His Garden
- Get the Look
- The Great Interior Design Challenge
- Ground Force
- Gutted
- Hawaii Life
- Help! My House is Falling Down
- Home Away from Home
- Home Front
- Home Front in the Garden
- Home of the Year
- The Home Show
- Homes & Property
- Homes Under the Hammer
- Honey I Bought the House
- The Hotel Fixers
- The Hotel Inspector
- House Chain: Under Offer
- House Crashers
- House Doctor
- House Hunters International
- A House in Florida
- House in Spain
- House Invaders
- House Swap
- Houses Behaving Badly
- How Clean Is Your House?
- How Clean Is Your House? USA
- How to Rescue a House
- How to Survive the Property Crisis
- If It's Broke, Fix It!
- Income Property
- Island Life
- It's Not Easy Being Green
- Jackpot Homes
- Kirstie's Homemade Home
- Kitchen SOS
- Living in the Sun
- Living with Modern Design
- Love It or List It
- Love the Place You're in
- Love the Place You're in: 48 Hours
- Mad About the House: US
- Make My Home Bigger
- Marbella Mansions
- Massive Moves
- Mediterranean Life
- Million Pound Property Experiment
- Model Gardens
- My Dream Derelict Home
- My Dream Home
- My Flat-Pack Home
- My Life for Sale
- The New Reclaimers
- Nick Knowles' Original Features
- Our House
- Perfect Properties
- A Place by the Sea
- A Place in the Sun
- A Place in the Sun: Home or Away?
- Property Prophets
- Put Your Money Where Your House Is
- Real Rooms
- The Reclaimers
- Relocation Relocation Australia
- Renovation Realities
- The Restoration Man
- Restored to Glory
- Roomers
- Room to Improve
- Selling Houses Australia
- Selling Houses with Amanda Lamb
- Selling London
- Showhouse
- Small Town Gardens
- Staying Put?
- Storage Hunters
- Storage Hunters UK
- This Old House
- Three in a Bed
- Timber Kings
- Tiny House, Big Living
- To Build or Not to Build
- To Buy or Not to Buy
- Trash to Cash
- Ty Pennington's Great British Adventure
- Ty Pennington's Homes for the Brave
- The Unsellables
- Urban Outsiders
- The Victorian Kitchen Garden
- Wanted Down Under
- Wanted in Paradise
- What the Neighbours Did
- Workshop Wonders
- World's Most Secret Homes
- Wreck or Ready?
- You Deserve This House

== See also ==
- HGTV (American channel)
- Good Food
- UKTV Gardens
- UKTV Bright Ideas
- UKTV
- Television in the United Kingdom
