= Discovery History =

Programming
- Picture format: 576i SDTV
- Timeshift service: Discovery History +1

Ownership
- Owner: Warner Bros. Discovery EMEA
- Sister channels: List: Animal Planet; Discovery; Discovery Historia; Discovery Science; Discovery Turbo; DMAX Germany, Austria, Switzerland & Liechtenstein; DMAX Spain; DMAX United Kingdom & Ireland; Food Network; Investigation Discovery; Quest; Quest Red; Real Time Italy; Really; TLC Netherlands; TLC Poland; TLC Romania; TLC UK and Ireland; Travel Channel

History
- Launched: 1 October 1998; 28 years ago
- Former names: Discovery Civilisation (1999-2006); Discovery Civilization (2006-2007); Discovery Knowledge (2007-2010)

Availability

Streaming media
- Virgin TV Go: Watch live (UK only)
- Virgin TV Anywhere: Watch live (Ireland only)

Discovery History is a British channel with programming about history from Warner Bros. Discovery.

== History ==
On 19 August 1998, Discovery announced they would launch several new digital channels to coincide with the launch of Sky Digital platform, one of which would be Discovery Civilisation Channel, which launched on 1 October 1998. It was devoted to documentaries regarding history and civilisations, historic, ancient or present.

On 1 November 2007, Discovery Civilisation was renamed Discovery Knowledge, by Heavenly. The new channel was still focused on history and natural history, but the schedule now included programming on engineering, crime and technology.

After just over three years, on 7 November 2010, Discovery Knowledge was renamed Discovery History. The idea behind this rebranding was to take the channel's focus back to becoming "the only UK channel dedicated to factual history", to counter the fact that its competitors History and Yesterday had begun showing more reality and scripted programming, respectively.

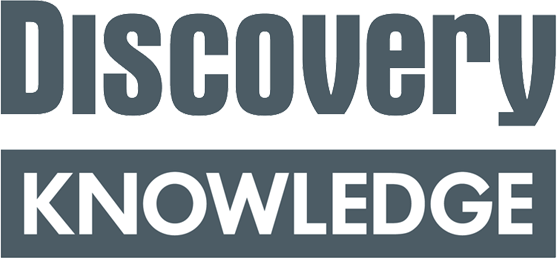
discovery history logo from 2012

In February 2013, A+E Networks, which operates History, lost a High Court battle to stop Discovery from using the Discovery History brand in the UK.

== See also ==
- Investigation Discovery (US)
- Discovery World
- List of documentary television channels
