= Really (TV channel) =

British free-to-air digital television channel

- Logo used since 13 January 2026
- Country: United Kingdom
- Broadcast area: United Kingdom and Ireland

Programming
- Language: English
- Picture format: 16:9 576i SDTV
- Timeshift service: Really +1

Ownership
- Owner: UKTV (2009–2019); Discovery, Inc. (2019–2022); Warner Bros. Discovery (2022-2026); Skydance Corporation (2026-present)
- Sister channels: Animal Planet; Boomerang; Cartoonito; CNN International; Cartoon Network; Discovery Channel; Discovery History; Discovery Science; Discovery Turbo; DMAX; Food Network; Investigation Discovery; Quest; Quest Red; TLC

History
- Launched: 19 May 2009; 17 years ago
- Replaced: UKTV Gardens

Availability

Terrestrial
- Freeview: Channel 44

Really is a British free-to-air digital television channel broadcasting in the United Kingdom and Ireland, currently owned by Skydance Corporation. The channel launched on 19 May 2009 as UKTV's channel for female audiences. Since January 2026, the channel shows HGTV shows, alongside antiques, lifestyle and paranormal programming. It is available on satellite through Sky and Freesat, cable through Virgin Media and also on digital terrestrial provider Freeview.

== History ==
The channel was launched on 19 May 2009 at 9am as part of the major rebranding and repositioning of the UKTV network. The new channel was created to provide fashion, medical, real life, and crime programming on the UKTV network, by airing programming previously aired on UKTV Style. As part of the repositioning of UKTV Style to Home, this channel would focus primarily on home and garden programming. As part of this, UKTV Gardens was closed, with programmes merged with Home. The new channel Really would launch from UKTV Gardens' broadcast slot and would replace the channel on that service. Responsible for launching Really would be the channel head: Clare Laycock since July 2008. The channel was originally available only on satellite and cable services, however on 14 June 2011, UKTV announced that Really would launch on Freeview channel 20 on 2 August 2011. The channel, along with Drama, were added to Virgin Media in Ireland in September 2018.

On 1 April 2019, it was announced that UKTV co-owner Discovery, Inc. would acquire the BBC's stake in Really.

In January 2026, Really moves to Freeview channel 44, acquiring the linear homemaking content of former digital makeover channel HGTV, which is being replaced on linear by the revamped TLC from 13 January 2026.

== Identity ==
Really logo from 19 May 2009 to 14 May 2013.

Really's identity originally centred on a pop art style cartoon of women in various situations which as the ident goes on resolves itself into an unusual outcome. At this outcome, the characters are shown with speech bubbles containing the Really logo, which then forms into the centre of the screen. Really used a generic promotion layout, consisting of the logo starting off the promotion before being located in the bottom right corner of the screen throughout before forming in the centre of the screen, alongside one of the ident characters, at the end.

Really received a new look on 15 May 2013, created by Red Bee Media, along with a new slogan 'Really gets you'.

On 31 March 2016, Really received new idents. This time, the screen is split into two at a 45-degree angle, and that 2 objects come together to form one, these idents are similar to the launch of the UKTV network in 1997. For example, a rose and a hypodermic needle, a camera and a bank safe and X-ray and ink.

In January 2026, in line with the channel refresh, a new pastel colour scheme, dominated by magenta, mauve and yellow, was introduced, retaining the main logo established in 2017, with the logo lettering in yellow on a magenta ground. The main ident is now a montage of home makeover scenes, with a bold block font for slogans and programme titles. New soft music and a new announcer complete the relaunched look.

== Programming ==
The majority of Really's programmes came from the programme archives of the BBC, through their once part ownership of UKTV. Due to a similar remit between the two channels, Really re-broadcasts many programmes previously shown on the channel BBC Three, and a few from BBC One, ITV, Channel 4 and Channel 5. The channel also has UK exclusive airings of the US shows Hart of Dixie and Covert Affairs.

Since the channel began airing in 2009, Medicals Real Life and Crimes on 7 September 2009 Most Haunted Live! 2015 remains the most watched programme in the channel's history. The episode featured a paranormal investigation at '30 East Drive'. In recent years, the channel has dropped drama and crime content and concentrated on weight loss and dating reality show, antiques and paranormal content, but the latter category has been scaled back considerably since the Warner Brother takeover. Multiple repeats of Ghost Adventures and newly-commissioned paranormal content has been scaled back to only new Ghost Adventures and new seasons and repeats of the popular Help My House is Haunted!, but in late 2025, the producers confirmed that production of new seasons has been put on hold.

In January 2026, the former makeover content of ex-linear channel HGTV moves to Really, coinciding with the latter moving from channel 17 to 44 on Freeview.

Really's past and current schedule of programmes include:

- 10 Years Younger
- A Life of Grime
- A Place in the Sun
- Addicted to Beauty
- Antiques Road Trip
- Being Human – (Series 1)
- Bizarre ER
- Boston Med
- Bridezillas
- Britain's Missing Top Model
- Celebrity MasterChef
- Cheaters
- Covert Affairs
- Cruise TV by LoveitBookit
- The Clothes Show
- Destination Fear
- Divorce Court
- Don't Tell the Bride
- Doctor Who
- The Ellen DeGeneres Show – (Series 9 and 10)
- Escape to the Country
- Extreme Makeover
- Extreme Makeover: Home Edition
- Final Witness
- Four in a Bed
- Freaky Eaters
- Gavin & Stacey
- Ghost Adventures
- Ghost Hunters
- Ghost Nation
- Grey's Anatomy – (Series 1, 2, 3 and 4)
- Hart of Dixie – (Series 1, 2 and 3)
- Haunted Collector
- Haunting: Australia
- Helicopter Heroes
- Hitched or Ditched
- How to Look Good Naked
- I Survived Evil
- Kill It, Cook It, Eat It
- Mary Queen of Shops
- MasterChef Australia
- MasterChef New Zealand
- MasterChef South Africa
- Missing Persons Unit
- Most Haunted
- Most Haunted Live!
- That Mitchell and Webb Look
- The Mighty Boosh
- The O.C.
- One Born Every Minute
- Paranormal Lockdown
- Paranormal Lockdown UK
- Paranormal Witness
- The Rachel Zoe Project
- The Sex Inspectors
- Tipping Point
- Say Yes to the Dress with Tan France
- Snog Marry Avoid?
- Smart Guy
- Undercover Boss
- What Not to Wear

=== Medical programming ===
- City Hospital
- Doctors at Large
- Doctors to Be
- Medical Emergency
- Medics of the Glen
- Trauma
- Your Life in their Hands

=== Real life programming ===
- 999
- 999 Lifesavers
- Accident and Emergency
- Ambulance – (Series 1)
- Blues and Twos
- Chopper Coppers
- Cops
- Global Cops
- Lifeboat Rescue
- Raw Blues
- Rescue Heroes

=== Crime programming ===
- Autopsy
- Catching the Killers
- Crimes and Firelines
- Crime Pursuits
- Crime Squad
- Forensic Files
- Inside the Criminal Mind
- Killer Cult
- Mind of the Murderers
- Scenes of Crime
- Serial Killers
- Traffic Cops

== See also ==
- UKTV
- Television in the United Kingdom
