= U&W =

British television channel

- Logo used since 2024
- Broadcast area: United Kingdom; Ireland

Programming
- Language: English
- Picture format: 1080i HDTV (SDTV feed downscaled to 16:9 576i)
- Timeshift service: U&W +1

Ownership
- Owner: BBC Studios
- Parent: UKTV
- Sister channels: U&Alibi; U&Dave; U&Drama; U&Eden; U&Gold; U&Yesterday

History
- Launched: 7 October 2008; 18 years ago
- Replaced: UKTV Style +2; UKTV Gold +1
- Former names: Watch (2008–2016); W (2016–2024)

Links
- Website: u.co.uk/channel/w

Availability

Terrestrial
- Freeview: Channel 25

Streaming media
- U: Stream Free (UK and Ireland only)
- Sky Go: Watch live (UK and Ireland only)
- Virgin TV: Watch live (UK only)
- TalkTalk TV: Watch live (UK only)

U&W is a British free-to-air television channel owned by UKTV, a subsidiary of BBC Studios. It originally launched on 7 October 2008 as Watch and until 2022 was a pay television channel. From 15 February 2016 to 16 July 2024, the channel was known as W.

== History ==
Watch launched on 7 October 2008, taking over capacity on Sky previously used for UKTV Style +2, which had closed on 15 September 2008 in preparation for the launch.

The channel would feature general entertainment programmes, primarily from the programming archive of the BBC, who owned a 50% share of the network through the corporation's commercial arm BBC Worldwide. Featured programmes included Torchwood, general entertainment programmes, and international versions of popular current British programming, (such as Dancing with the Stars, the US version of Strictly Come Dancing, and the various American editions of Wipeout, which is titled as Total Wipeout USA to avert confusion with the British programme of the same name). The channel also featured programmes displaced following the repositioning of other UKTV channels (such as the move of all non-crime drama to the channel following Alibi's launch), and programming already shown on other UKTV channels in greater numbers (such as Traffic Cops). The channel controller was Paul Moreton.

On 15 February 2016, Watch was rebranded as W. The channel's programming would be revamped and would feature original dramas, documentaries, and lifestyle shows.

The channel went free on satellite on 21 March 2022, one week ahead of a full relaunch of W as a free-to-air channel on both Freeview and Freesat on 28 March. The relaunch saw a revised onscreen identity, and a shift in programming to target women. To make way for the addition of W, Dave ja vu (the timeshift service of Dave) moved to the position previously occupied by Drama +1, which had been added to the Freeview lineup following UKTV's purchase and closure of CCXTV.

In November 2023, UKTV announced that it would be rebranding their TV channels and streaming service under the new "U" masterbrand. In early July 2024, UKTV started to roll out a similar logo to its "U" masterbrand. The logo can be found on the corporate website and on "U" (UKTV Play) On 16 July 2024, W rebranded as U&W.

== Subsidiary channels ==
=== U&W +1 ===
The channel also operates a timeshift service, U&W +1, where the programme schedule is repeated by the channel one hour later. The channel receives no special branding, with the occasional exception of a special Digital on-screen graphic (DOG). It launched the same day as the main Watch channel on 7 October 2008 and was reported by AGB Nielsen Media Research on 2 September 2008.

=== U&W HD ===
On 29 July 2011, UKTV announced that it had secured a deal with Sky to launch three more high-definition channels on their platform. As part of Virgin Media's deal to sell its share of UKTV, all five of UKTV's HD channels would also be added to Virgin's cable television service by 2012. Watch HD launched on 12 October 2011 on Sky and Virgin Media, two days after Dave HD, while Alibi HD launched in July 2012. All three channels are HD simulcasts of the standard-definition channels. Watch HD became available on BT TV & Plusnet later in the year. The HD feed on Sky Q and Sky HD closed on 1 April 2025, though it will continue as normal on Sky Glass and Sky Stream.

== On-air identity ==
=== 2008–2016 ===
When Watch launched in October 2008, along with G.O.L.D. and Alibi, the original on screen identity featured a large eyeball nicknamed 'Blinky'. The music used in the background of the television advertisements is "You Will Leave a Mark" by Oxford band A Silent Film. The channel's original idents featured a live-action video of the eyeball being pushed around by a large and varied group of people around various settings until the eyeball ends up in the centre of the screen and the Watch name appears at the bottom of the screen. The set of four idents were produced by Red Bee Media for the channel. However, in April 2009, the four existing idents were edited by Aardman Animations to make the inflatable eyeball blink, along with new soundtracks. In addition, four new CGI idents were introduced as well as the edited idents and in May 2010, a new ident for Scream if You Know the Answer!

During May 2010, UKTV were reportedly planning to overhaul the brand identity of Watch, after only eighteen months in operation. The broadcaster held a branding agency pitch and made an appointment within a month, with the review was being handled by creativebrief. The work included the creation of a fresh logo, strap-line and tone of voice for the channel, however, a spokeswoman for UKTV denied suggestions that the broadcaster would change the name of the channel and said that the overhaul was about "tweaking the brand and aligning it better with our overall strategy".

The 2010 idents have their full tagline "(x) together, (y) together, (z) together, Watch together (e.g.: Sing together, play together, Get it together, Watch together)".

The new Watch logo and channel presentation launched on 23 September 2010, focusing on the idea that "TV is better shared!". The new identity, created by agency Harriman Steel, includes a new strapline, "Watch... together", along with new idents, end frames and a new logo. The idents feature a scene against a black background with various elements of the scene being provided, by people in black outfits. The scenes progress with the appearance of the film being seen in reverse until the ident pans to a screen displaying three phrases related to the scene ending with the word "together." before the Watch logo is placed over the last phrase forming the channel tagline. Other promotional material makes use of the channel tagline or the appearance that the channel promotions are held in place by the black dressed men, as seen by the various covered hands shown at the edge of promotion end boards.

On 23 January 2012, it was announced that Watch would receive a rebrand for a second time, created by DixonBaxi, and was to be launched on 13 February 2012, but only the promos, DOG and ECP changed on that date. But the new idents were made on 9 March 2012.

=== 2016–2022 ===
On 15 January 2016, it was announced that Watch would be renamed to W on 15 February 2016.

In February 2022, Broadcast magazine reported that the channel would become a free-to-air channel in the spring, joining stablemates Dave, Yesterday and Drama as a Freeview service. In March 2022, this was confirmed by UKTV, who rebranded the channel's mantra to "Life Unfiltered" and introduced a new logo which included the letter W in a slanted rectangle. The logo will be mainly seen on air and in corporate branding with an orange background, with channel idents showing a series of relatable human moments behind the logo. This female skewing channel will be still targeted at a 25 to 44 age range and will be on Freeview channel 25 from 28 March 2022. W have a free-to-air launch schedule with programmes such as Inside the Ambulance, Stacey Dooley Sleeps Over, Nurses on the Ward, Emma Willis Delivering Babies, Emma Willis & AJ Odudu Get to Work and Women on the Force, part of the line-up.

=== 2022–present ===
UKTV confirmed the rumours that the W channel was going to rebrand as a free-to-air channel on 28 March 2022 at 6:10am. To coincide with the move, channel bosses unveiled a new logo and "Life Unfiltered" strapline which they say will help the channel connect with its female skewing 25-44 target audience. The 2022 idents were kept in the rebranding to U&W, with the logo being changed to follow the other channels.

== Logo history ==
First logo, 7 October 2008 until 23 September 2010

Second logo, 23 September 2010 until 9 March 2012

Third logo, 13 February 2012 until 15 February 2016

Fourth logo, 15 February 2016 until 28 March 2022

Third HD logo, 15 February 2016 until 28 March 2022

Fourth +1 logo, 15 February 2016 until 28 March 2022

Fifth logo, 28 March 2022 until 16 July 2024

Fourth HD logo, 28 March 2022 until 16 July 2024

Fifth +1 logo, 28 March 2022 until 16 July 2024

Fifth HD logo, 16 July 2024 - present

Sixth +1 logo, 16 July 2024 - present

== Programming ==
=== Current programming ===
- 999: Rescue Squad
- Absolutely Fabulous
- American Housewife
- Brothers & Sisters
- Beverly Hills Pawn
- The Bill
- Border Patrol
- Boston's Finest
- Booze Patrol Australia
- The Catherine Tate Show
- Celebrity Advice Bureau
- Celebrity Haunted Mansion
- Celebrity Haunted Mansion: High Spirits
- Celebrity MasterChef
- Chewing Gum
- Choccywoccydoodah
- Dating with My Mates
- David Beckham: Into The Unknown
- DIY SOS
- Doctor Who
- Elementary (5 November 2025)
- Emma Willis: Delivering Babies
- Emma Willis: Meet the Babies
- Extreme Makeover: Home Edition
- Fatal Attraction
- Gavin & Stacey
- The Good Fight
- Heston's Fantastical Food
- Honey I Bought The House
- Humble Pie
- In the Club
- Inside the Ambulance
- I've Got Something To Tell You
- Luther
- Masterchef Australia
- MasterChef Junior USA
- MasterChef USA
- Million Dollar Intern
- Miranda
- The Musketeers
- My Dream Home
- My Family
- Myleene: Miscarriage and Me
- Nev's Indian Call Centre
- NCIS: New Orleans
- Nick Knowles' Original Features
- Nurses on the Ward
- Oddities
- One Born Every Minute
- Outnumbered
- Property Brothers
- Rochelle Humes: Interior Designer in the Making
- Sea City
- Shades of Blue
- Sherlock
- Stacey Dooley Investigates
- Stacey Dooley Sleeps Over
- The Secrets in My Family
- Supernanny
- Tipping Point
- Traffic Cops
- The Wave
- The Wedding Fixer
- Who Do You Think You Are?
- Who Do You Think You Are? USA
- Why Women Kill
- Women on the Verge

=== Former programming ===
- Aaagh! It's the Mr. Hell Show!
- After You've Gone
- Alcatraz
- Atlantis
- Bailiffs
- Battlechefs
- Baywatch
- Beauty & the Beast
- Being Human
- Believe
- Ben Earl: Trick Artist
- Best In Town
- Betty White's Off Their Rockers
- Bin There, Dump That
- Blues and Twos
- The Blue Planet
- Border Patrol
- The Borrowers
- Cars, Cops And Criminals
- Celebrity Haunted Hotel Live
- Celebrity Haunted Hotel: Do Not Disturb
- Choccywoccydoodah: Starstruck
- Code Black
- Criminal Minds: Beyond Borders
- Crisis
- Creature Comforts
- Coastguard Florida
- Confessions from the Underground
- Covert Affairs
- Dancing with the Stars
- Daredevil
- David Attenborough's Natural Curiosities
- Derren Brown
- Dynamo: Magician Impossible
- EastEnders
- Emergency Bikers
- Escape to the Country
- Fake or Fortune?
- Flights & Fights - Inside The Low Cost Airlines
- Get Me to the Church
- Grimm
- The Hairy Bikers' Cookbook
- Hart of Dixie
- Haunted Collector
- Haunted Highway
- Helicopter Heroes
- Hollywood Treasure
- The Honourable Woman
- Human Planet
- Iceland Foods: Life in the Freezer Cabinet
- Jackpots And Jinxes: Lottery Stories
- John Bishop: In Conversation With...
- Jonathan Creek
- Katherine Mills: Mind Games
- Kolkata with Sue Perkins
- Lark Rise to Candleford
- Love Soup
- The Men Who Jump Off Buildings
- Mistresses
- My Breasts And I
- My Flat - Pack Home
- My Hero
- Nigel Marven's Cruise Ship Adventure
- Outtake TV
- Paranormal Witness
- Perception
- Planet Dinosaur
- Planet Earth
- Pride and Prejudice
- Primeval
- Primeval: New World
- Quantum Leap
- Recruits
- Rex the Runt
- Recruits: Paramedics
- Rescue: Code One
- The Restoration Man
- Richard & Judy's New Position
- Rick Stein's Far Eastern Odyssey
- Road Patrol Australia
- The Route Masters: Running London's Roads
- The Roux Scholarship 2013
- Sara Cox on Friendship
- Secrets and Lies
- Seven Envelopes
- Silk
- Singing in the Rainforest
- Sky Cops
- Sophie on Fame
- Stacey Dooley in Australia
- Stansted: The Inside Story
- Stranded
- Supersize My Job
- The Strain
- Tarrant Lets the Kids Loose
- Top Gear
- Two Pints of Lager and a Packet of Crisps
- Undercover Boss
- Vets in Practice
- Vets to the Rescue
- W1A
- Walking with...
- The Weakest Link
- World's Most Talented
- The World's Strictest Parents

=== Most watched programmes ===
The following is a list of the 11 most watched shows on W, based on Live +7 data supplied by BARB up to 7 February 2016. The number of viewers does not include repeats or W +1.

Rank	Show	Episode	Viewers	Date
1	Dynamo: Magician Impossible	2.01	1,927,000	5 July 2012
2	Dynamo: Magician Impossible	2.02	1,826,000	12 July 2012
3	Dynamo: Magician Impossible	2.03	1,793,000	19 July 2012
4	Dynamo: Magician Impossible	1.04	1,441,000	28 July 2011
5	Dynamo: Magician Impossible	1.02	1,391,000	14 July 2011
6=	Dynamo: Magician Impossible	1.03	1,384,000	21 July 2011
6=	Dynamo: Magician Impossible	2.04	1,384,000	26 July 2012
8	Alcatraz	1.01 – Pilot	1,299,000	13 March 2012
9	Alcatraz	1.06 – Paxton Petty	1,229,000	17 April 2012
10=	Alcatraz	1.08 – The Ames Brothers	1,193,000	1 May 2012
10=	Dynamo: Magician Impossible	3.01	1,193,000	11 July 2013

== See also ==
- UKTV
- Television in the United Kingdom
