= U&Alibi =

Digital television channel broadcasting in the United Kingdom

- Logo used since 2024
- Country: United Kingdom
- Broadcast area: United Kingdom and Ireland

Programming
- Language: English
- Picture format: 1080i HDTV (downscaled to 16:9 576i for the SDTV feed)
- Timeshift service: U&Alibi +1

Ownership
- Owner: BBC Studios
- Parent: UKTV
- Sister channels: U&Dave; U&Drama; U&Eden; U&Gold; U&W; U&Yesterday

History
- Launched: 1 November 1997; 28 years ago
- Former names: UK Arena (1997–2000); UK Drama (2000–2004); UKTV Drama (2004–2008); Alibi (2008–2024)

Links
- Website: uandalibi.co.uk

Availability

Streaming media
- Sky Go: Watch live (UK and Ireland only)
- Virgin TV Go: Watch live (UK only)
- TalkTalk TV: Watch live (UK only)
- Watch live (UK only)

U&Alibi is a British premium television channel that was launched on 1 November 1997 as UK Arena. It was renamed UK Drama in 2000, and then UKTV Drama in 2004, Alibi on 7 October 2008, and U&Alibi on 7 November 2024.

== History ==
The channel originally launched as part of the new four-channel UKTV network on 1 November 1997. The channel, originally named UK Arena, focused on arts programming and was named after the BBC's flagship arts programme Arena (The BBC, through BBC Worldwide, owning half of UKTV and therefore half the channel). The channel aired as a part-time service, airing from 3:00 pm every day.

However, following disappointing ratings, the channel's focus was broadened to include all drama series, and as a result was renamed UK Drama on 31 March 2000. However, the channel remained a part-time service, starting at 7:00 pm.

On 5 November 2001, UK Drama began timesharing with a new sister channel, UK Food, which aired in UK Drama's daytime slot.

On 10 January 2003, UK Food extended its broadcast hours while UK Drama reduced its broadcast hours to 9:00 pm–5:00 am.

On 8 March 2004, the channel, alongside all other UKTV channels, was renamed UKTV Drama to increase awareness of the UKTV brand. On 1 July 2004, UKTV Food extended its broadcast hours, leading to UKTV Drama moving to UKTV Food +1's slot (which had been vacated by UKTV People), although still broadcasting the same hours as before.

On 9 April 2005, UKTV announced that UKTV Drama would expand to a full 24-hour schedule on 30 May. In order to prepare for the transition, the channel moved out of UKTV Food +1's downtime slot to a newly purchased space and started broadcasting from 1:00 pm at the end of April, before the full transition to a 24-hour network.

On 2 May 2006, a one-hour timeshift service, UKTV Drama +1, launched on Sky in the vacated broadcast space formerly home to UKTV People +1. It broadcast from 3:00pm–2:00am every day. Corresponding to the name on the main channel shows all programming from the channel one hour later, with no special idents or continuity used.

On 23 October 2007, UKTV Drama +1 was added to Virgin Media.

Following the successful relaunch and rebranding of the channel UKTV G2 as Dave on 15 October 2007, the remaining UKTV channels underwent the same changes. UKTV Drama and UKTV Drama +1 were renamed as Alibi and Alibi +1, respectively, on 7 October 2008, and the channel's programmes were changed to focus specifically on crime dramas. All non-crime dramas were transferred to the rebranded Gold channel or to the newly created flagship channel Watch.

On 29 July 2011, UKTV announced that it had secured a deal with BSkyB to launch three more high-definition channels on Sky. As part of Virgin Media's deal to sell its share of UKTV, all five of UKTV's HD channels would also be added to Virgin's cable television service by 2012. Alibi HD launched on 3 July 2012 on Sky and Virgin Media, while Dave HD and Watch HD launched in October 2011. All three channels are HD simulcasts of the standard-definition channels.

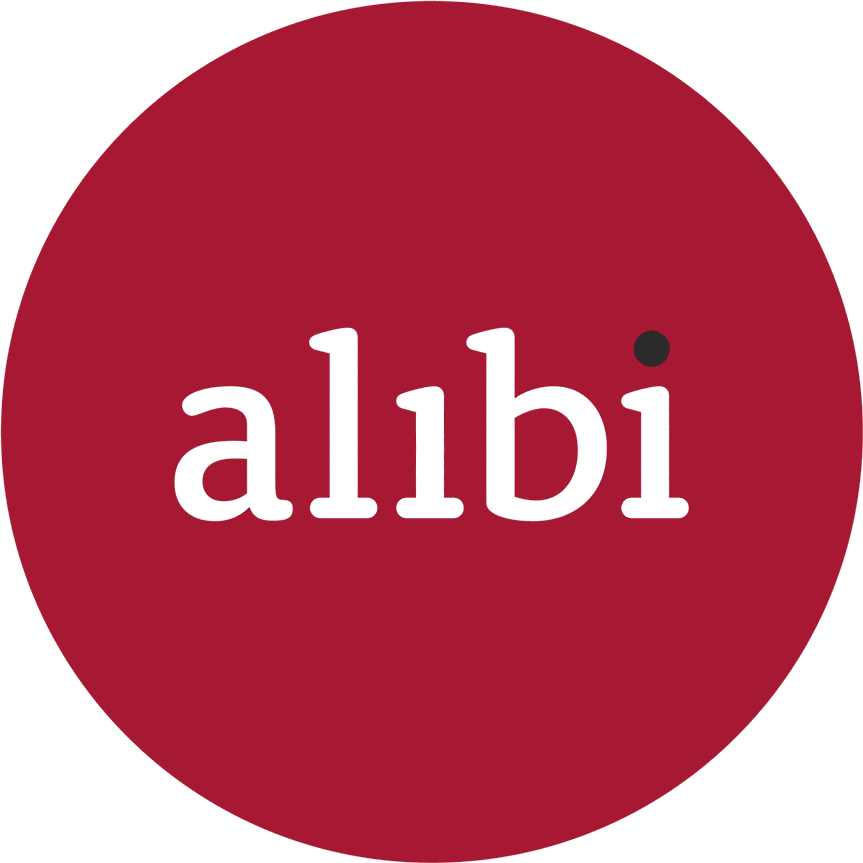
Alibi logo used from 2015 to 2024

== Programmes ==
The output of the channel is a combination of drama series and serials comprising first-run exclusive and second run shows from the United States and Canada, together with second run showings of shows from the BBC and ITV.

== Original programmes ==
=== Drama ===
- Bookish (2025)
- Mudtown (2025)

=== Co-production ===
- Inspector George Gently (BBC)

=== Current ===
- Saint-Pierre (Canadian import from CBC)
- Return to Paradise (Australian/British import from BBC/ABC TV)
- The Mallorca Files (BBC) (series 1-2 only)
- One Child (BBC)
- Ashes to Ashes (BBC) (also on BBC iPlayer)
- Allegiance (import from NBC Universal & CBC)
- The Boy That Never Was (RTÉ) (also on U&Drama)
- Beyond Paradise (BBC)
- Catch Me a Killer (Showmax) (also on U&Drama)
- Death in Paradise (BBC) (also shown on Drama)
- The Doctor Blake Mysteries (Australian import from ABC (Australia)/Seven Network) (also shown on Drama)
- Dark Winds (American import from AMC/AMC+)
- Father Brown (BBC) (also shown on Drama) and spin-off of Sister Boniface Mysteries
- Far North
- Hudson & Rex (Canadian import from Citytv/CBC)
- Hightown (first aired on Starzplay) (series 1-2 only)
- The Hunting Party (American import from NBC)
- McMafia (BBC/AMC) (also on U&Dave)
- Miss Fisher's Murder Mysteries (Australian import from ABC (Australia)) (also on U&Drama)
- Miss Scarlet and The Duke (American import from PBS)
- My Life Is Murder (Australian import from Network Ten, New Zealand import from TVNZ 1)
- Murdoch Mysteries (Canadian import/UKTV co-production with Citytv/CBC)
- NCIS: Sydney (Australian import first aired on Paramount+)
- Private Eyes(Canadian import from Global)
- Shakespeare & Hathaway: Private Investigators (BBC)
- Sherlock (BBC) (also on BBC iPlayer)
- Smother (RTÉ) (also on U&Drama)
- Spooks (BBC) (also on U&Drama)
- Waking the Dead (also on BBC iPlayer and U&Drama)
- WPC 56 (BBC)

=== Previously ===
- Alaska Daily (first aired on Disney+)
- Annika (BBC) (original series)
- The Assets (American import from ABC)
- Covert Affairs (American import from USA Network)
- 1-800-Missing (American import from Lifetime, Canadian import from W Network)
- 55 Degrees North (BBC)
- Bergerac (BBC) (now on Drama)
- The Bill (ITV) (now on W and Drama)
- Body of Proof (American import from ABC)
- Briarpatch (American import from USA Network)
- Carter (Canadian import from CTV Network)
- Cagney and Lacey (American import from CBS)
- Campion (BBC)
- Clarice (American import from CBS)
- Castle (American import from ABC)
- The Closer (American import from TNT)
- Criminal Minds: Beyond Borders (American import from CBS)
- Criminal Minds: Suspect Behaviour (American import from CBS)
- Crossing Lines (American import from NBC/Ovation)
- The Company You Keep (American Broadcasting Company)
- CSI: Vegas (American import from CBS)
- Dalziel and Pascoe (BBC) (now on Drama)
- Dangerfield (BBC) (now on Drama)
- Diagnosis: Murder (American import from CBS, now on CBS Justice)
- The Diplomat (BBC) (original series)
- Doctor Who (BBC) (broadcast during 2008 as a special season presenting all of Tom Baker's episodes)
- Due South (American import from CBS, Canadian import from CTV, now on Sony Channel)
- Deception (American import from ABC)
- Elementary (American import from CBS) (previously shown on Sky Witness)
- Evil (series 1-3 only) (American import from CBS/Paramount+)
- Father Dowling Mysteries (American import from NBC/ABC)
- The Game (BBC)
- The Glades (American import from A&E)
- The Good Wife (American import from CBS) (previously shown on More 4)
- The Guardian (American import from CBS)
- Hamish Macbeth (BBC) (now on Drama)
- Hart to Hart (American import from ABC, now on Sony Channel)
- Harrow (Australian import from ABC (Australia))
- Hetty Wainthropp Investigates (BBC/ITV) (now on Drama)
- Hunter (BBC)
- I, Jack Wright (2025) (series 1 only)
- The Inspector Alleyn Mysteries (BBC)
- The Inspector Lynley Mysteries (BBC) (now on Drama)
- Jack Taylor (Irish import from TV3)
- Jonathan Creek (BBC) (now on Drama)
- Judge John Deed (BBC) (now on Drama)
- Justified (previously shown on 5USA, also on Disney+)
- King & Maxwell (American import from TNT)
- The Last Detective (ITV)
- Lie to Me (American import from Fox) (previously on Sky One)
- Maisie Raine (BBC) (now on Drama)
- Major Crimes (American import from TNT)
- The Missing (American import from Starz now on BBC)
- Motive (American import from ABC, Canadian import from CTV)
- The Mrs. Bradley Mysteries (BBC) (now on Drama)
- The Mentalist (CBS)
- Murder in Mind (BBC)
- The Murder Room (BBC)
- Murder, She Wrote (American import from CBS, now on 5USA)
- My Life Is Murder (Australian import from Network Ten, New Zealand import from TVNZ 1)
- New Tricks (BBC) (now shown on Drama)
- One of Us (BBC)
- Perception (American import from TNT)
- Person of Interest (American import from CBS) (previously shown on Channel 5) (now on Prime and Netflix)
- Pretty Hard Cases (Canadian import from CBC) (series 1-2 only)
- Ragdoll (American import/UKTV co-production with AMC+)
- The Protector (American import from Lifetime)
- Quantico (American import from ABC)
- Rebus (ITV) (now on Drama)
- The Red King
- Reckless (American import from CBS)
- Reilly, Ace of Spies (ITV)
- Return of the Saint (ITV)
- Republic of Doyle (Canadian import from CBC, now on Fox)
- Ripper Street (BBC) (now on Drama)
- Rizzoli & Isles (American import from TNT)
- The Rockford Files (American import from NBC)
- Rosewood (American import from Fox)
- The Ruby in the Smoke (BBC)
- Rush (Australian import from Network Ten)
- The Saint (ITV)
- Secrets and Lies (American import from ABC)
- Sherlock (American import from PBS now on BBC)
- Shoestring (BBC)
- So Help Me Todd (American import from CBS)
- Spooks (BBC) (now on Drama)
- Stumptown (American import from ABC)
- Sue Thomas: F.B. Eye (American import from PAX)
- Ten Days in the Valley (American import from ABC)
- Traces (BBC) (2 series, 12 episodes) (Alibi original series) (Renewed)
- Tommy (American import from CBS)
- Unforgettable (American import from CBS) (previously shown on Sky Living)
- Waco (now on Paramount+)
- Waking the Dead (BBC) (now on Drama)
- Wallander (BBC)
- Whiskey Cavalier (American import from ABC)
- White Collar (USA Network)
- Why Women Kill (American import from Paramount+)
- Without a Trace (American import from CBS) (previous shown on More4 and Channel 5)
- We Hunt Together (BBC) (2 series, 12 episodes) (Alibi original series)

=== TV movies ===
- Caught in His Web
- Cruel Instruction
- The Pastor's Wife
- Wedding Planner Mystery
- Killing Daddy
- No One Would Tell
- An Officer and a Murderer
- The Hunt for the I-5 Killer
- Menendez: Blood Brothers
- Who Killed JonBenet?
- The Lost Wife of Robert Durst
- Ahead of the Class
- The Chris Porco Story
- The Carlina White Story
- A Killer Among Us
- Deadly Influencer

=== Movies ===
- Gone Girl
- Homefront
- SWAT
- In the Line of Fire
- Runaway Jury

== See also ==
- Television in the United Kingdom
