= Homefront =

A home front or homefront is the civilian populace of the nation at war as an active support system for its military.

== Home fronts in wars ==
- American Civil War
  - Economic history of the American Civil War
  - Economy of the Confederate States of America
- Home front during World War I
  - German occupation of Belgium during World War I
  - Economic history of World War I
  - History of Germany during World War I#Home front
  - History of the United Kingdom during the First World War
  - United States home front during World War I
- Home front during World War II
  - Australian home front during World War II
  - German occupation of Belgium during World War II
  - Canada in World War II#Home front
  - German military administration in occupied France during World War II
  - Vichy France
  - Nazi Germany
  - Netherlands in World War II
  - Pacific Islands home front during World War II
  - Occupation of Poland (1939–1945)
  - Polish culture during World War II
  - United Kingdom home front during World War II
  - United States home front during World War II
- Women in the World Wars
  - Women in World War I
  - Women in World War II

== Military ==
- Home Front Command, an Israeli military command
- Operation Homefront, a U.S. non-profit for supporting military families

== Arts, entertainment, media ==
=== Film ===
- The Home Front (1940 film), a Canadian documentary short directed by Stanley Hawes
- The Home Front, a 1943 animated short in the Private Snafu series
- Home Front (1988 film), a 1988 British television film by Nick McCarty in the anthology series ScreenPlay
- Homefront (2013 film), an American action-thriller directed by Gary Fleder
- Home Front (2020 film), a French drama directed by Lucas Belvaux

=== Literature ===
- Homefront, a 1986 book by Patti Davis, née Reagan; see Patti Davis § Bibliography
- Homefront, a 2005 novel by Chuck Logan
- The Home Front, a 1932 book by Sylvia Pankhurst
- "Mars: The Home Front", a 1996 short story by George Alec Effinger

=== Music ===
- Home Front (band), a Canadian post-punk musical group of the 2020s

=== Radio ===
- Home Front (BBC radio series), BBC Radio 4 drama set in Britain during World War I
- Homefront, the former title of the radio program, Today's Homeowner with Danny Lipford

=== Television ===
==== TV shows ====
- Home Front (TV series), a lifestyle television series airing on TVNZ's channel Television One
- Homefront (1994 TV series), British BBC TV show series about interior design
- Homefront (American TV series), 1990s American ABC TV show series set in the 1940s
- Homefront (2012 TV series), British ITV drama about the wives of soldiers fighting in Afghanistan

==== TV episodes ====
- "Home Front" (Brothers & Sisters), 2007
- "Home Front" (Doctors), 2005
- "Homefront" (NCIS), 2016
- "Homefront" (Star Trek: Deep Space Nine), 1996
- "The Home Front" (The 4400), 2006

=== Video games ===
- Homefront (video game), a video game released in 2011
- Homefront: The Revolution, a 2016 video game (a reboot of the first Homefront)
