= Home front during World War I =

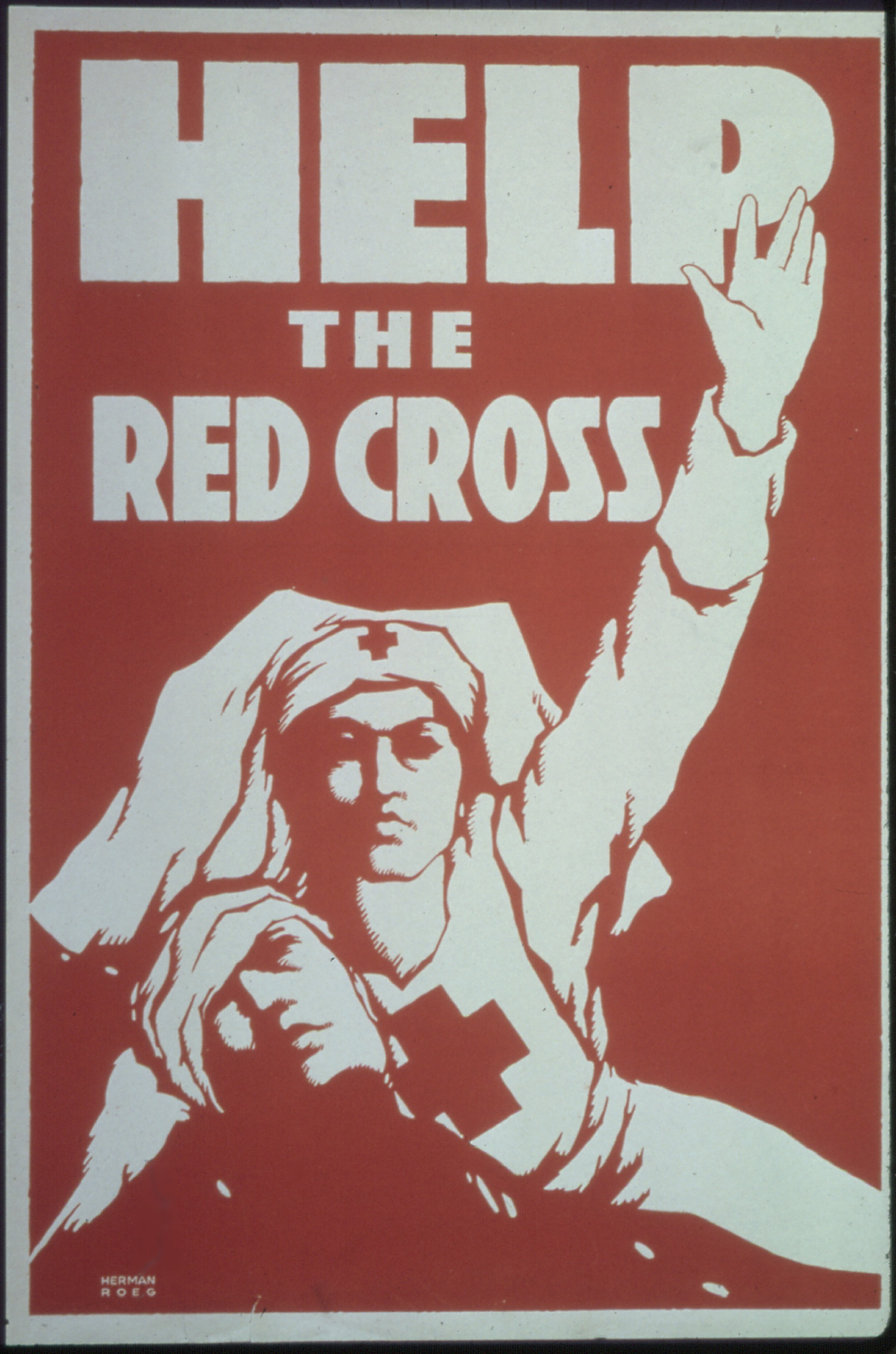
"Help the Red Cross". American poster by the U.S. Food Administration, circa 1917–1919.

The home front during World War I covers the domestic, economic, social and political histories of countries involved in that conflict. For nonmilitary interactions among the major players see diplomatic history of World War I.

About 10.9 million combatants and seven million civilians died during the entire war, including many weakened by years of malnutrition; they fell in the worldwide Spanish flu pandemic, which struck late in 1918, just as the war was ending.

The Allies had much more potential wealth that they could spend on the war. One estimate (using 1913 US dollars), is that the Allies spent $147 billion ($4.5tr in 2023 USD) on the war and the Central Powers only $61 billion ($1.88tr in 2023 USD). Among the Allies, Britain and its Empire spent $47 billion and the United States $27 billion; among the Central Powers, Germany spent $45 billion.

Total war demanded the total mobilization of all the nation's resources for a common goal. Manpower had to be channeled into the front lines (all the powers except the United States and Britain had large trained reserves designed for just that). Behind the lines labor power had to be redirected away from less necessary activities that were luxuries during a total war. In particular, vast munitions industries had to be built up to provide shells, guns, warships, uniforms, airplanes, and a hundred other weapons, both old and new. Agriculture had to be mobilized as well, to provide food for both civilians and for soldiers (many of whom had been farmers and needed to be replaced by old men, boys and women) and for horses to move supplies. Transportation in general was a challenge, especially when Britain and Germany each tried to intercept merchant ships headed for the enemy. Finance was a special challenge. Germany financed the Central Powers. Britain financed the Allies until 1916, when it ran out of money and had to borrow from the United States. The US took over the financing of the Allies in 1917 with loans that it insisted be repaid after the war. The victorious Allies looked to defeated Germany in 1919 to pay "reparations" that would cover some of their costs. Above all, it was essential to conduct the mobilization in such a way that the short term confidence of the people was maintained, the long-term power of the political establishment was upheld, and the long-term economic health of the nation was preserved. For more details on economics see Economic history of World War I.

World War I had a profound impact on woman suffrage across the belligerents. Women played a major role on the homefronts and many countries recognized their sacrifices with the vote during or shortly after the war, including the United States, Britain, Canada (except Quebec), Denmark, Austria, the Netherlands, Germany, Russia, Sweden and Ireland. France almost did so but stopped short.

== Financial costs ==
The total direct cost of war, for all participants including those not listed here, was about $80 billion in 1913 US dollars—around $2.47 trillion in 2023 dollars. Direct cost is figured as actual expenditures during war minus normal prewar spending. It excludes postwar costs such as pensions, interest, and veteran hospitals. Loans to/from allies are not included. Repayment of loans after 1918 is not included. The total direct cost of the war as a percent of wartime national income:

- Allies: Britain, 37%; France, 26%; Italy, 19%; Russia, 24%; United States, 16%.
- Central Powers: Austria-Hungary, 24%; Germany, 32%; Turkey unknown.

The amounts listed below are presented in terms of 1913 US dollars, where $1 billion then equals about $25 billion in 2017.

- Britain had a direct war cost about $21.2 billion; it made loans to Allies and Dominions of $4.886 billion, and received loans from the United States of $2.909 billion.
- France had a direct war cost about $10.1 billion; it made loans to Allies of $1.104 billion, and received loans from Allies (United States and Britain) of $2.909 billion.
- Italy had a direct war cost about $4.5 billion; it received loans from Allies (United States and Britain) of $1.278 billion.
- The United States had a direct war cost about $12.3 billion; it made loans to Allies of $5.041 billion.
- Russia had a direct war cost about $7.7 billion; it received loans from Allies (United States and Britain) of $2.289 billion.

The two governments agreed that financially Britain would support the weaker Allies and that France would take care of itself. In August 1914, Henry Pomeroy Davison, a Morgan partner, traveled to London and made a deal with the Bank of England to make J.P. Morgan & Co. the sole underwriter of war bonds for Great Britain and France. The Bank of England became a fiscal agent of J.P. Morgan & Co., and vice versa. Over the course of the war, J.P. Morgan loaned about $1.5 billion (approximately $28 billion in today's dollars) to the Allies to fight against the Germans. Morgan also invested in the suppliers of war equipment to Britain and France, thus profiting from the financing and purchasing activities of the two European governments.

Britain made heavy loans to Tsarist Russia; the Lenin government after 1920 refused to honor them, causing long-term issues.

== Britain ==
At the outbreak of war, patriotic feelings spread throughout the country, and many of the class barriers of Edwardian era faded during the years of combat. However, overnight, the Catholics in southern Ireland moved to demand for complete immediate independence after the failed Easter Rebellion of 1916. Northern Ireland remained loyal to the crown.

In 1914 Britain had by far the largest and most efficient financial system in the world. Roger Lloyd-Jones and M. J. Lewis argue:

To prosecute industrial war required the mobilization of economic resources for the mass production of weapons and munitions, which necessarily entitled fundamental changes in the relationship between the state (the procurer), business (the provider), labor (the key productive input), and the military (the consumer). In this context, the industrial battlefields of France and Flanders intertwined with the home front that produced the materials to sustain a war over four long and bloody years.

Economic sacrifices were made, however, in the name of defeating the enemy. In 1915 Liberal politician David Lloyd George took charge of the newly created Ministry of Munitions. He dramatically increased the output of artillery shells—the main weapon actually used in battle. In 1916 he became secretary for war. Prime Minister H. H. Asquith was a disappointment; he formed a coalition government in 1915 but it was also ineffective. Asquith was replaced by Lloyd George in late 1916. He had a strong hand in the managing of every affair, making many decisions himself. Historians credit Lloyd George with providing the driving energy and organisation that won the War.

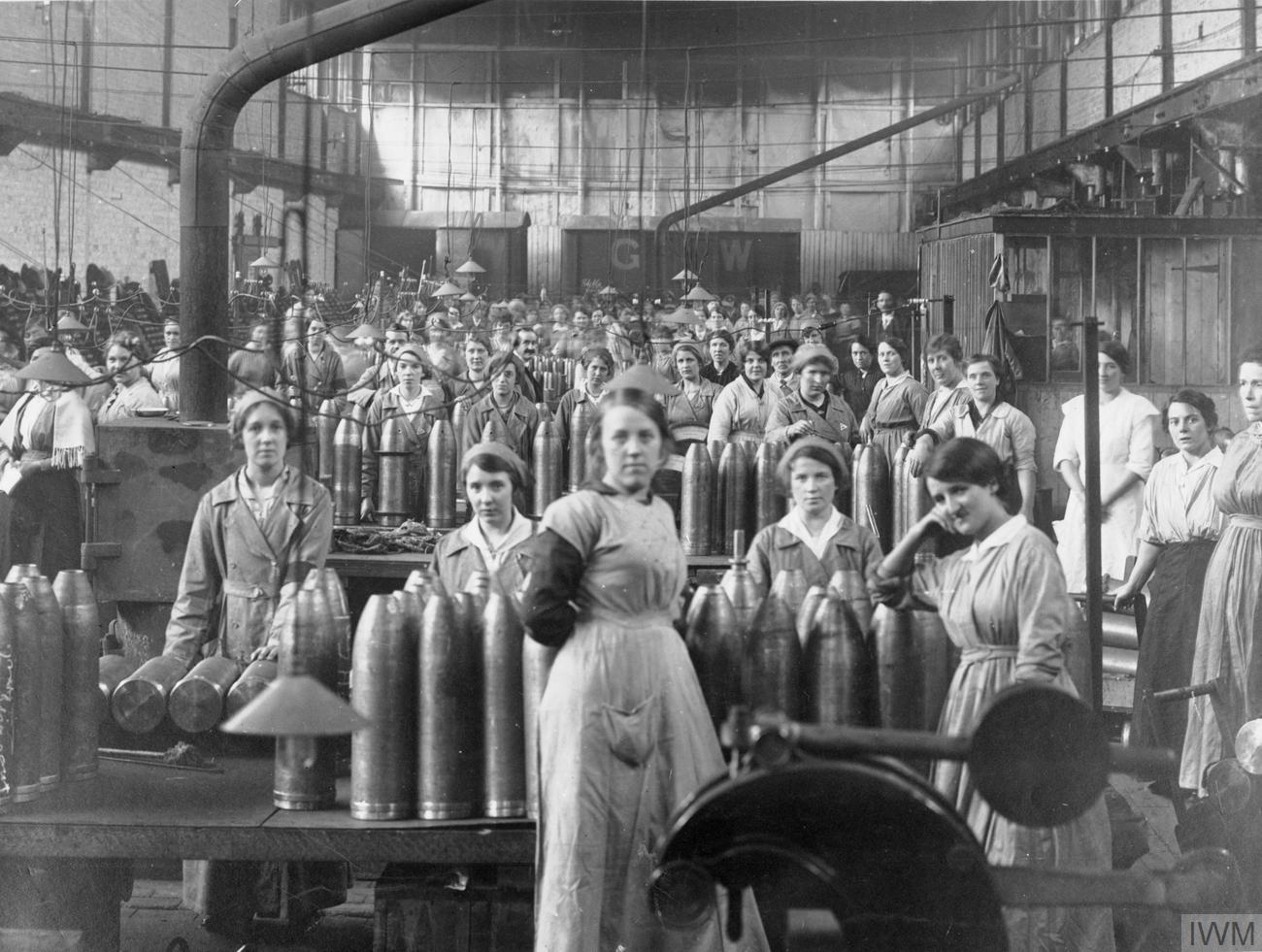
Female munition workers filling shells

Although Germans were using Zeppelins to bomb the cities, morale remained relatively high due in part to the propaganda churned out by the national newspapers. With a severe shortage of skilled workers, industry redesigned work so that it could be done by unskilled men and women (termed the "dilution of labour") so that war-related industries grew rapidly. Lloyd George cut a deal with the trades unions—they approved the dilution (since it would be temporary) and threw their organizations into the war effort.

Historian Arthur Marwick saw a radical transformation of British society, a deluge that swept away many old attitudes and brought in a more equalitarian society. He also saw the famous literary pessimism of the 1920s as misplaced, for there were major positive long-term consequences of the war. He pointed to new job opportunities and self-consciousness among workers that quickly built up the Labour Party, to the coming of partial woman suffrage, and an acceleration of social reform and state control of the British economy. He found a decline of deference toward the aristocracy and established authority in general, and a weakening among youth of traditional restraints on individual moral behavior. Marwick concluded that class differentials softened, national cohesion increased, and British society became more equal. During the conflict, the various elements of the British Left created the War Emergency Workers' National Committee, which played a crucial role in supporting the most vulnerable people on the Home Front during the war, and in ensuring the British Labour remained united in the years after the Armistice.

=== Scotland ===
Scotland played a major role in the British effort in the First World War. It especially provided manpower, ships, machinery, food (particularly fish) and money, engaging with the conflict with some enthusiasm. With a population of 4.8 million in 1911, Scotland sent 690,000 men to the war, of whom 74,000 died in combat or from disease, and 150,000 were seriously wounded. Scottish urban centres, with their poverty and unemployment were favourite recruiting grounds of the regular British army, and Dundee, where the female dominated jute industry limited male employment had one of the highest proportion of reservists and serving soldiers than almost any other British city. Concern for their families' standard of living made men hesitate to enlist; voluntary enlistment rates went up after the government guaranteed a weekly stipend for life to the survivors of men who were killed or disabled. After the introduction of conscription from January 1916 every part of the country was affected. Occasionally Scottish troops made up large proportions of the active combatants, and suffered corresponding loses, as at the Battle of Loos, where there were three full Scots divisions and other Scottish units. Thus, although Scots were only 10 per cent of the British population, they made up 15 per cent of the national armed forces and eventually accounted for 20 per cent of the dead. Some areas, like the thinly populated Island of Lewis and Harris suffered some of the highest proportional losses of any part of Britain. Clydeside shipyards and the nearby engineering shops were the major centers of war industry in Scotland. In Glasgow, radical agitation led to industrial and political unrest that continued after the war ended.

In Glasgow, the heavy demand for munitions and warships strengthened union power. There emerged a radical movement called "Red Clydeside" led by militant trades unionists. Formerly a Liberal Party stronghold, the industrial districts switched to Labour by 1922, with a base among the Irish Catholic working class districts. Women were especially active in solidarity on housing issues. However, the "Reds" operated within the Labour Party and had little influence in Parliament; the mood changed to passive despair by the late 1920s.

=== Politics ===
David Lloyd George became prime minister in December 1916 and immediately transformed the British war effort, taking firm control of both military and domestic policy.

In rapid succession in spring 1918 came a series of military and political crises. The Germans, having moved troops from the Eastern front and retrained them in new tactics, now had more soldiers on the Western Front than the Allies. Germany launched a full scale Spring Offensive (Operation Michael), starting 21 March against the British and French lines, with the hope of victory on the battlefield before the American troops arrived in numbers. The Allied armies fell back 40 miles in confusion, and facing defeat, London realized it needed more troops to fight a mobile war. Lloyd George found a half million soldiers and rushed them to France, asked American President Woodrow Wilson for immediate help, and agreed to the appointment of French General Foch as commander-in-chief on the Western Front so that Allied forces could be coordinated to handle the German offensive.

Despite strong warnings it was a bad idea, the War Cabinet decided to impose conscription on Ireland. The main reason was that labour in Britain demanded it as the price for cutting back on exemptions for certain workers. Labour wanted the principle established that no one was exempt, but it did not demand that the draft actually take place in Ireland. The proposal was enacted but never enforced. The Catholic bishops for the first time entered the fray and called for open resistance to a draft. Many Irish Catholics and nationalists moved into the intransigent Sinn Féin movement. This proved a decisive moment, marking the end of Irish willingness to stay inside the UK.

When on 7 May 1918, a senior army general on active duty, Major-General Sir Frederick Maurice went public with allegations that Lloyd George had lied to Parliament on military matters, a crisis was at hand. The German spring offensive had made unexpected major gains, and a scapegoat was needed. Asquith, the Liberal leader in the House, took up the allegations and attacked Lloyd George (also a Liberal), which further split the Liberal Party. While Asquith's presentation was poorly done, Lloyd George vigorously defended his position, treating the debate as a vote of confidence. He won over the House with a powerful refutation of Maurice's allegations. The main results were to strengthen Lloyd George, weaken Asquith, end public criticism of overall strategy, and strengthen civilian control of the military.

Meanwhile, the German offensive stalled. By summer the Americans were sending 10,000 fresh men a day to the Western Front, a more rapid response made possible by leaving their equipment behind and using British and French munitions. The German army had used up its last reserves and was steadily shrinking in number and weakening in resolve. Victory came with the Armistice on 11 November 1918.

=== Women ===
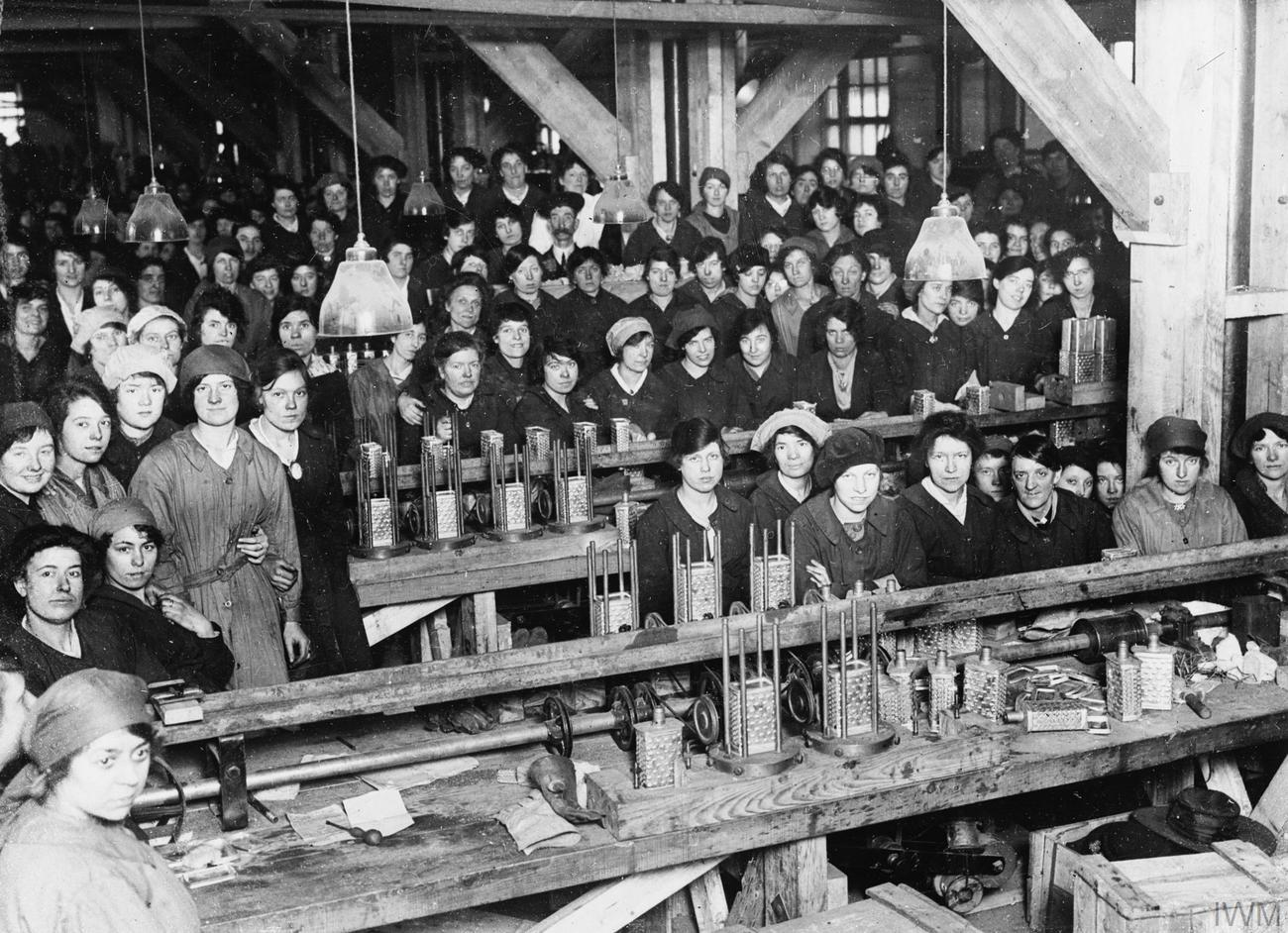
Female workers in a gas mask factory, Holloway, London, 1918

Prime Minister David Lloyd George was clear about how important the women were:

It would have been utterly impossible for us to have waged a successful war had it not been for the skill and ardour, enthusiasm and industry which the women of this country have thrown into the war.

The militant suffragette movement was suspended during the war, and at the time people credited the new patriotic roles women played as earning them the vote in 1918. However, British historians no longer emphasize the granting of woman suffrage as a reward for women's participation in war work. Pugh (1974) argues that enfranchising soldiers primarily and women secondarily was decided by senior politicians in 1916. In the absence of major women's groups demanding for equal suffrage, the government's conference recommended limited, age-restricted women's suffrage. The suffragettes had been weakened, Pugh argues, by repeated failures before 1914 and by the disorganizing effects of war mobilization; therefore they quietly accepted these restrictions, which were approved in 1918 by a majority of the War Ministry and each political party in Parliament. More generally, Searle (2004) argues that the British debate was essentially over by the 1890s, and that granting the suffrage in 1918 was mostly a byproduct of giving the vote to male soldiers. Women in Britain finally achieved suffrage on the same terms as men in 1928.

== British Empire ==
The British Empire provided imports of food and raw material, worldwide network of naval bases, and a steady flow of soldiers and workers into Britain.

=== Canada ===
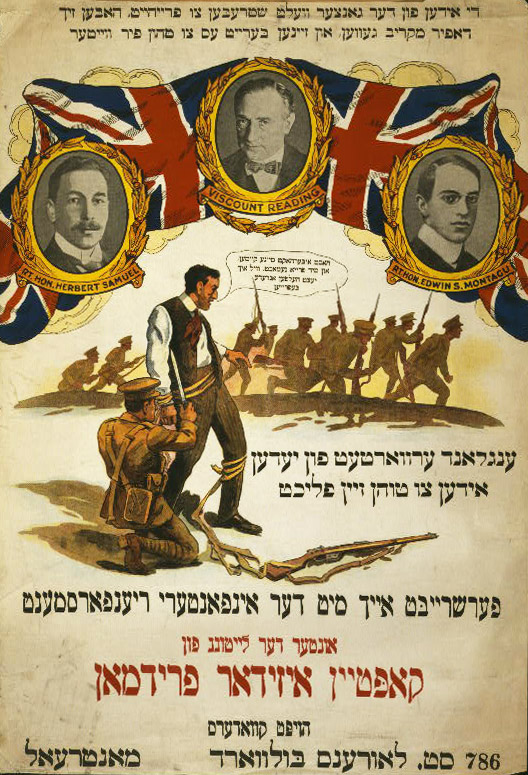
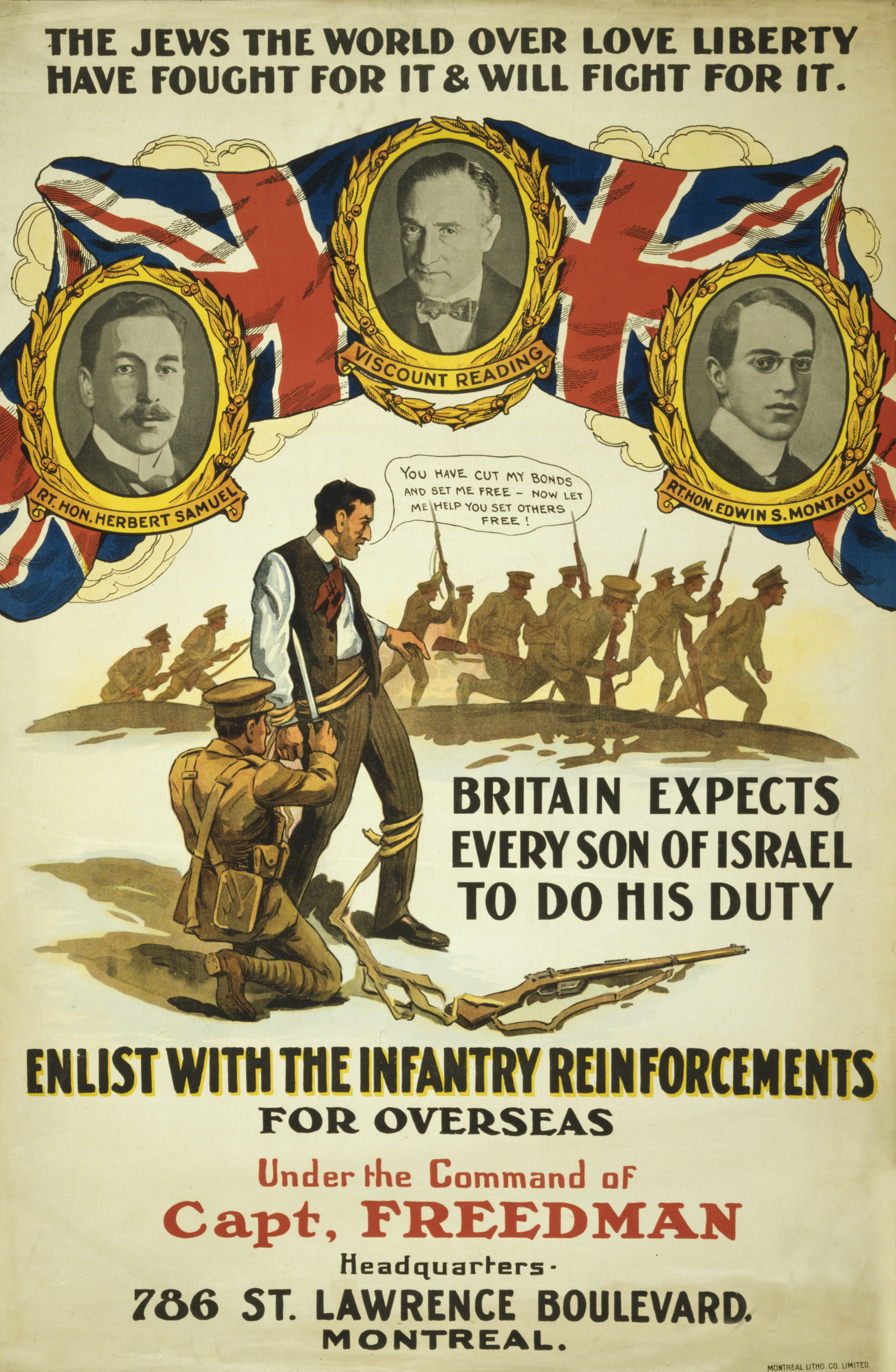
Yiddish (top) and English versions of World War I recruitment posters directed at Canadian Jews.

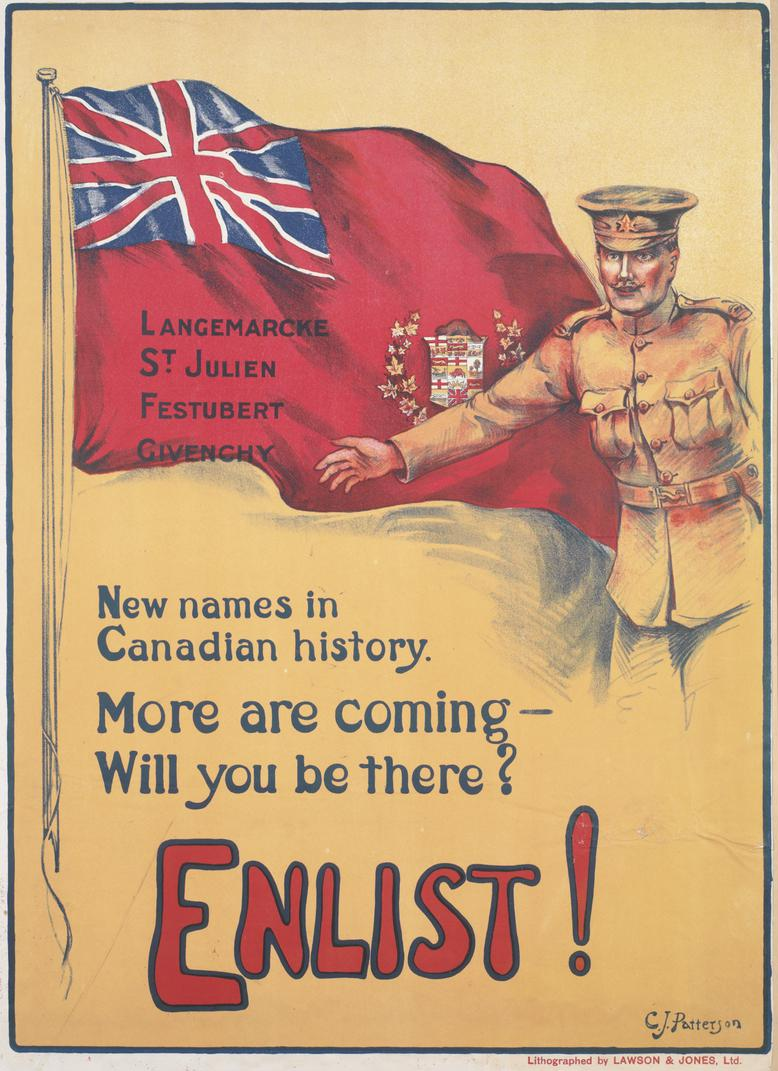
A Canadian recruiting poster featuring names of French battlefields (but an English text)

The 620,000 men in service were most notable for combat in the trenches of the Western Front; there were 67,000 war dead and 173,000 wounded. This total does not include the 2,000 deaths and 9,000 injuries in December 1917 when a munitions ship exploded in Halifax, Nova Scotia.

Volunteering provided enough soldiers at first, but high casualties soon required conscription, which was strongly opposed by Francophones (French speakers, based mostly in Quebec). The Conscription Crisis of 1917 saw the Liberal Party ripped apart, to the advantage of the Conservative's Prime Minister Robert Borden, who led a new Unionist coalition to a landslide victory in 1917.

Distrusting the loyalties of Canadians of German ethnicity and, especially, recent Ukrainian Canadian immigrants from Austria-Hungary, the government interned thousands of aliens.

In British Canada the response in 1914 was patriotic enthusiasm. In the Prairies there was as economic boom as the price of wheat tripled and farmers doubled the acreage. The wartime spirit of sacrifice intensified social reform movements that had predated the war and now came to fruition. Saskatchewan gave women the right to vote in 1916. Also in 1916 it passed a referendum to prohibit the sale of alcohol, as the women had demanded.

Outside Quebec patriotism created a demand for a common language: English. German usage practically vanished in public. The war brought to the forefront a fear of ethnicities, and a survival instinct developed the need for a Canadian identity.

The war validated Canada's new world role, in an almost-equal partnership with Britain in the Commonwealth of Nations. Arguing that Canada had become a true nation on the battlefields of Europe, Borden demanded and received a separate seat for Canada at the Paris Peace Conference of 1919. Canada's military and civilian participation in the First World War strengthened a sense of British-Canadian nationhood among the Anglophones (English speakers). The Francophones (French speakers) supported the war at first, but pulled back and stood aloof after 1915 because of language disputes at home. Heroic memories centered around the Battle of Vimy Ridge where the unified Canadian corps captured Vimy ridge, a position that the French and British armies had failed to capture and "Canada's Hundred Days" battles of 1918 which saw the Canadian Corps of 100,000 defeat one fourth of the German Army on the Western Front.

=== Australia ===
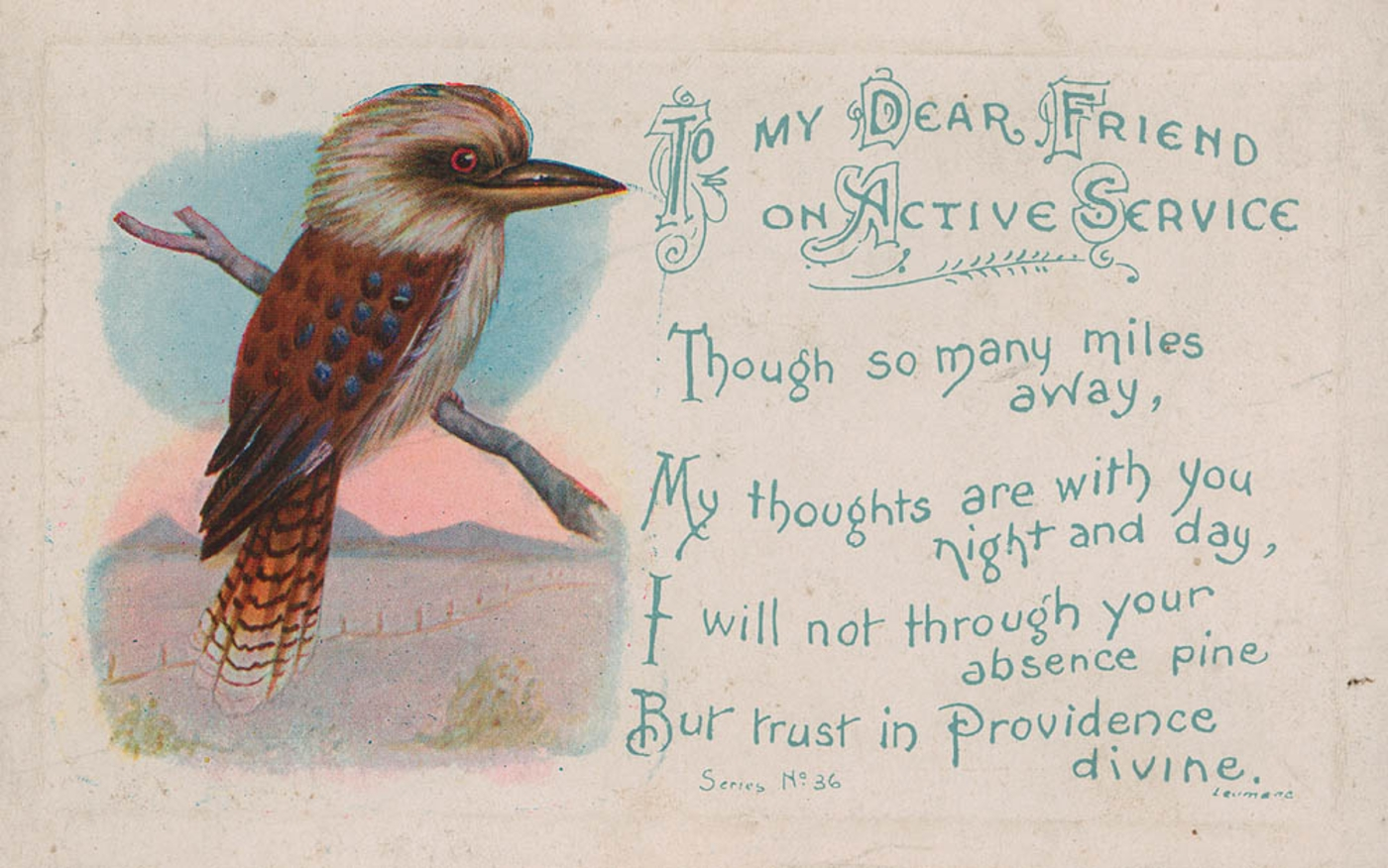
An Australian Kookaburra active service postcard

Billy Hughes, prime minister from October 1915, expanded the government's role in the economy, while dealing with intense debates over the issue of conscription.

From a population of five million, 417,000 men enlisted; 330,000 went overseas to fight during the First World War. They were all volunteers, since the political battle for compulsory conscription failed. Some 58,000 died and 156,000 were wounded. Gerhard Fischer argues that the government aggressively promoted economic, industrial, and social modernization in the war years. However, he says it came through exclusion and repression. He says the war turned a peaceful nation into "one that was violent, aggressive, angst- and conflict-ridden, torn apart by invisible front lines of sectarian division, ethnic conflict and socio-economic and political upheaval." The nation was fearful of enemy aliens—especially Germans, regardless of how closely they identified with Australia. The government interned 2,900 German-born men (40% of the total) and deported 700 of them after the war. Irish nationalists and labor radicals were under suspicion as well. Racist hostility was high toward nonwhites, including Pacific Islanders, Chinese and Aborigines. The result, Fischer says, was a strengthening of conformity to imperial/British loyalties and an explicit preference for immigrants from the British Isles.

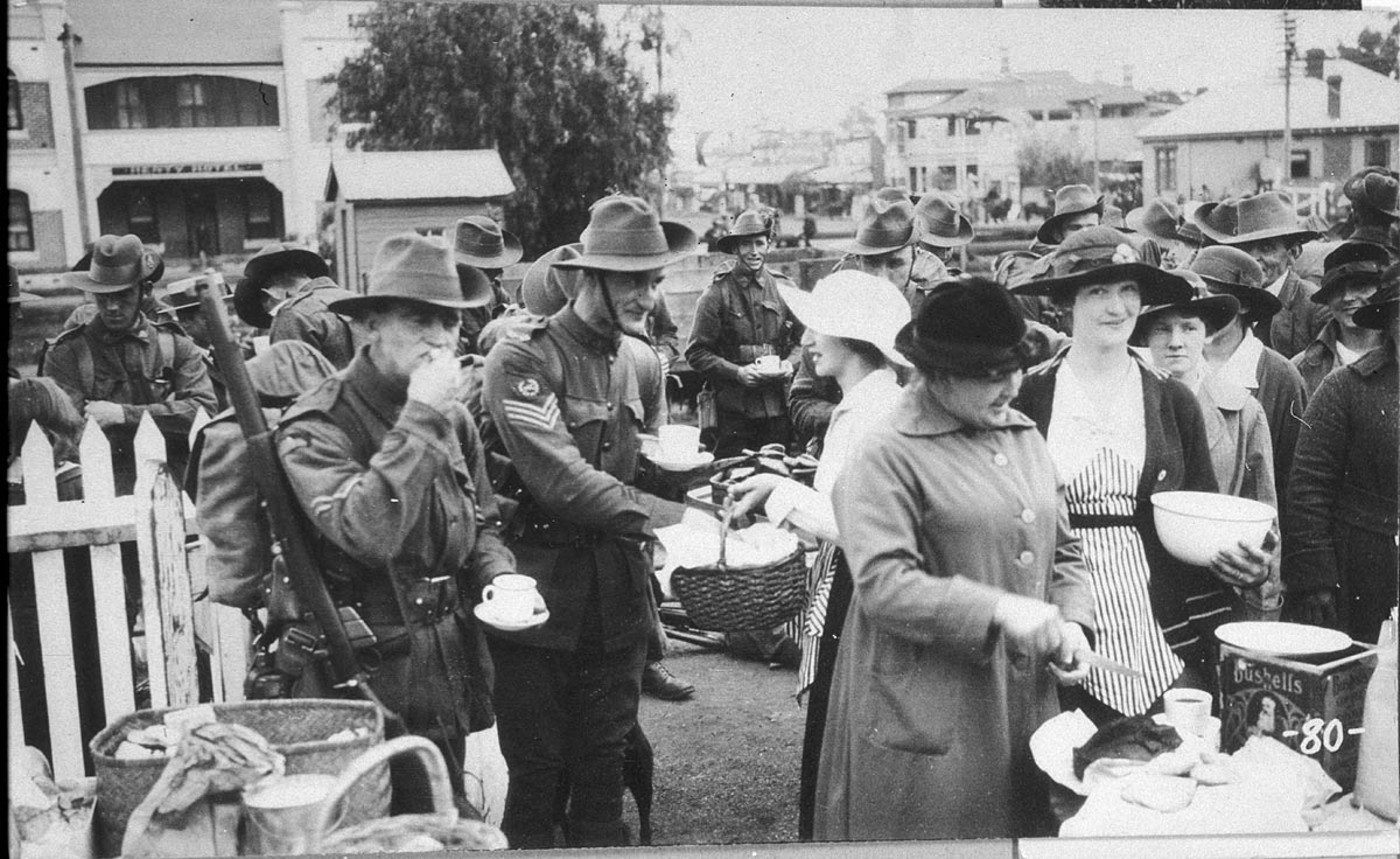
Australian soldiers being fed by women prior to embarkation, circa 1916

The major military event involved sending 40,000 ANZAC (Australia and New Zealand) soldiers in 1915 to seize the Gallipoli peninsula near Constantinople to open an Allied route to Russia and weaken the Ottoman Empire. The campaign was a total failure militarily and 8,100 Australians died. However the memory was all-important, for it transformed the Australian mind and became an iconic element of the Australian identity and the founding moment of nationhood.

On 1 January 1915, two Afghan men went on a shooting rampage near Broken Hill, New South Wales, killing four people and wounding seven before being killed by police and soldiers. The two men were acting under the incitement of Ottoman Sultan Mehmed V, who had proclaimed a holy war against the Entente. The battle was the only documented engagement with the enemy to take place on Australian soil during World War I.

==== Internment of German aliens ====
The War Precautions Act 1914 provided the Commonwealth government with wide-ranging powers for a period of up to six months after the duration of the war. It covered: the prevention of trade with hostile nations, issuing loans to pay for the war effort, the introduction of a national taxation scheme, the fixing of the prices of certain goods, the internment of people considered a danger to Australia, the compulsory purchase of strategic goods, and the censorship of the media.

At the outbreak of the war there were about 35,000 people who had been born in either Germany or Austria-Hungary living in Australia. They had weak ties with Germany (and almost none to Austria) and many had enlisted in the Australian war effort. Nevertheless, fears ran high and internment camps were set up where those suspected of unpatriotic acts were sent. In total 4,500 people were interned under the provisions of the War Precautions Act, of which 700 were naturalised Australians and 70 Australian born. Following the end of the war, 6,150 were deported.

==== Economy ====
The Australian Honour Flag, awarded to subscribers of the Australian Government's 7th War Loan in 1918

In 1914 the Australian economy was small but very nearly the most prosperous in the world per capita; it depended on the export of wool and mutton. London provided assurances that it would underwrite a large amount of the war risk insurance for shipping to allow trade amongst the Commonwealth nations to continue. London imposed controls so that no exports would wind up in German hands. The British government protected prices by buying Australian products, even though the shortage of shipping meant that there was no chance that they would ever receive them.

On the whole, Australian commerce was expanded due to the war, although the cost of the war was quite considerable and the Australian government had to borrow considerably from overseas to fund the war effort. In terms of value, Australian exports rose almost 45 per cent, while the number of Australians employed in manufacturing industries increased over 11 per cent. Iron mining and steel manufacture grew enormously. Inflation became a factor as the prices of consumer goods went up, while the cost of exports was deliberately kept lower than market value to prevent further inflationary pressures worldwide. As a result, the cost of living for many average Australians was increased.

The trade union movement, already powerful, grew rapidly, although the movement was split on the political question of conscription. It expelled the politicians, such as Hughes, who favoured conscription (which was never passed into law). The government sought to stabilize wages, much to the anger of unionists. The average weekly wage during the war was increased by between 8 and 12 per cent, it was not enough to keep up with inflation. Angry workers launched a wave of strikes against both the wage freeze and the conscription proposal. Nevertheless, the result was very disruptive and it has been estimated that between 1914 and 1918 there were 1,945 industrial disputes, resulting in 8,533,061 working days being lost and a £4,785,607 deficit in wages.

Overall, the war had a significantly negative impact on the Australian economy. Real aggregate Gross Domestic Product (GDP) declined by 9.5 percent over the period 1914 to 1920, while the mobilization of personnel resulted in a six percent decline in civilian employment. Meanwhile, although population growth continued during the war years, it was only half that of the prewar rate. Per capita incomes also declined sharply, failing by 16 percent.

=== New Zealand ===
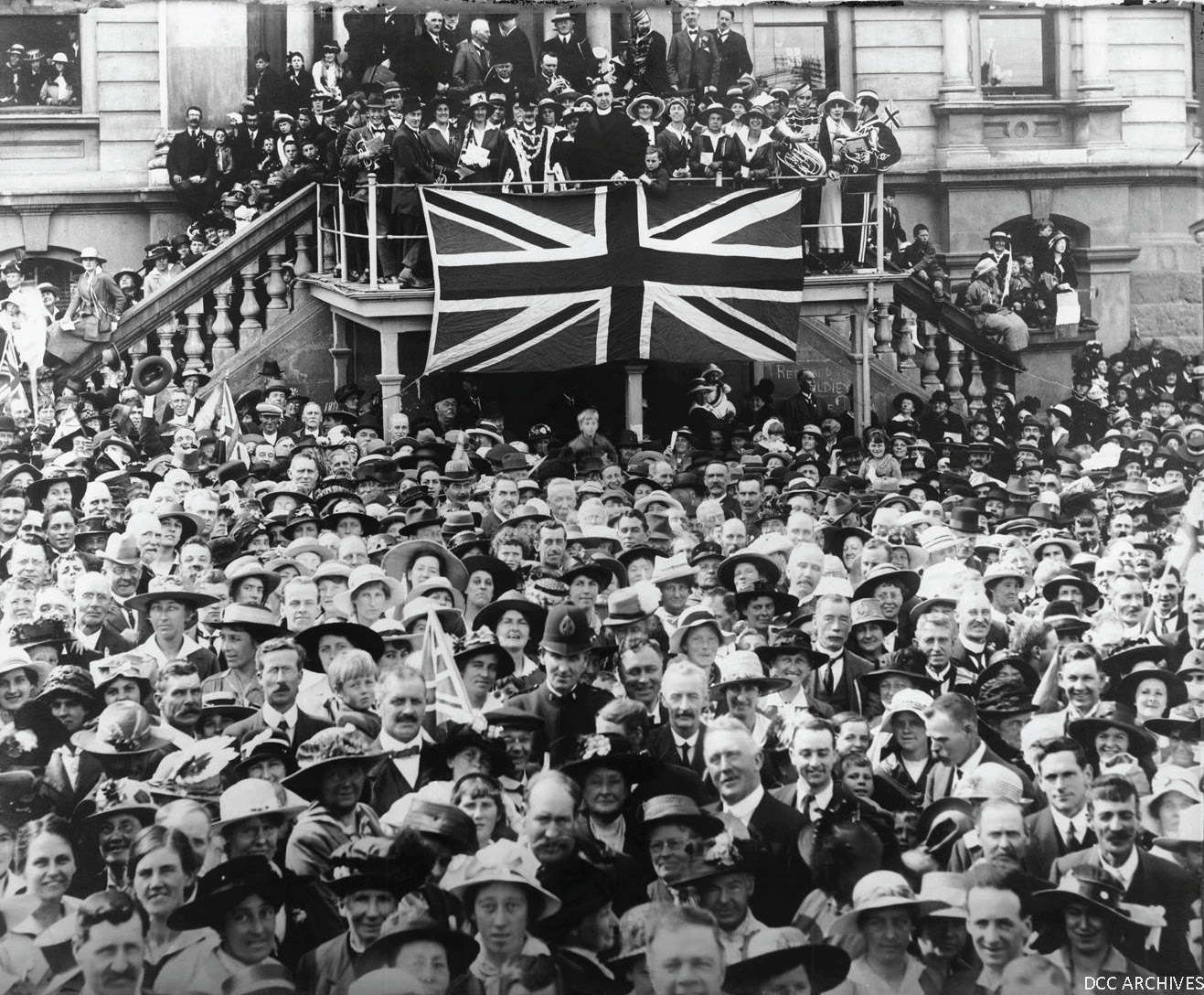
Residents of Dunedin celebrate the news of the Armistice of 11 November 1918.

The country remained an enthusiastic supporter of the Empire, enlisting 124,211 men and sending 100,444 to fight in World War I (see New Zealand Expeditionary Force). Over 18,000 died in service. Conscription was introduced in mid 1916 and by the end of the war near 1 in four members of the NZEF was a conscript. As in Australia, involvement in the Gallipoli campaign became an iconic touchstone in New Zealand memory of the war and was commonly connected to imaginings of collective identity.

The war divided the labour movement with numerous elements taking up roles in the war effort while others alleged the war was an imperial venture against the interests of the working class. Labour MPs frequently acted as critics of government policy during the war and opposition to conscription saw the modern Labour Party formed in 1916. Maori tribes that had been close to the government sent their young men to volunteer. The mobilisation of women for war work/service was relatively slight compared to more industrialised countries though some 640 women served as nurses with 500 going overseas.

New Zealand forces captured Western Samoa from Germany in the early stages of the war, and New Zealand administered the country until Samoan Independence in 1962. However many Samoans greatly resented the administration, and blamed inflation and the catastrophic 1918 flu epidemic on New Zealand rule.

=== South Africa ===
South Africa had a military role in the war, fighting the Germans in East Africa and on the Western Front. Public opinion in South Africa split along racial and ethnic lines. The British elements strongly supported the war and comprised the great majority of the 146,000 white soldiers. Nasson says, "for many enthusiastic English-speaking Union recruits, going to war was anticipated as an exciting adventure, egged on by the itch of making a manly mark upon a heroic cause." Likewise the Indian element (led by Mahatma Gandhi), generally supported the war effort. Afrikaners were split, with some like Prime Minister Louis Botha and General Jan Smuts taking a prominent leadership role in the British war effort. Their pro-British position was rejected by many rural Afrikaners who favoured Germany and who launched the Maritz Rebellion, a small-scale open revolt against the government. The trade union movement was also divided. Many urban blacks supported the war, expecting it would raise their status in society, others said it was not relevant to the struggle for their rights. The Coloured element was generally supportive and many served in a Coloured Corps in East Africa and France, also hoping to better their lot after the war. Those blacks and Coloureds who supported the war were embittered when the postwar era saw no easing of white domination and restrictive conditions.

=== India ===
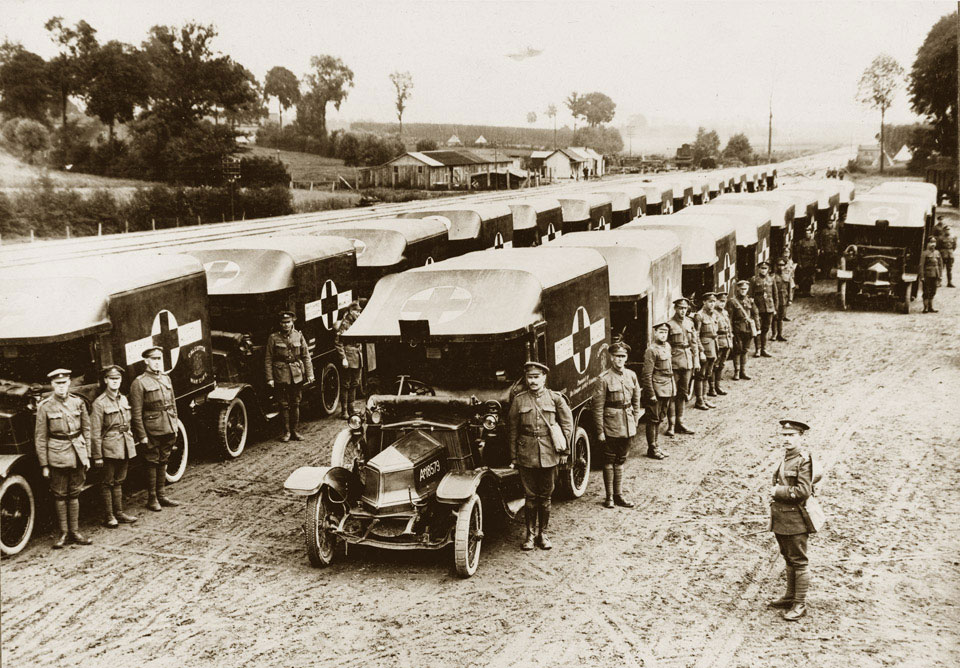
Ambulances from Calcutta, India donated to the war effort, 1916.

The British controlled India (including modern Pakistan and Bangladesh) either directly through the British Raj or indirectly through local princes. The colonial government of India supported the war enthusiastically, and enlarged the British Indian army by a factor of 500% to 1.4 million men. It sent 550,000 overseas, with 200,000 going as laborers to the Western Front and the rest to the Middle East theatre. Only a few hundred were allowed to become officers, but there were some 100,000 casualties. The main fighting of the latter group was in Mesopotamia (modern Iraq), where large numbers were killed and captured in the initial stages of the Mesopotamian campaign, most infamously during the Siege of Kut. The Indian contingent was entirely funded by the Indian taxpayers (who had no vote and no voice in the matter).

Although Germany and the Ottoman Empire tried to incite anti-British subversion with the help of Indian freedom fighters, such as Rash Bihari Bose or Bagha Jatin, they had virtually no success, apart from a localized 1915 Singapore Mutiny, which was a part of the Gadar conspiracy. The small Indian industrial base expanded dramatically to provide most of the supplies and munitions for the Middle East theatre. Indian nationalists became well organized for the first time during the war, and were stunned when they received little in the way of self-government in the aftermath of victory.

In 1918, India experienced an influenza epidemic and severe food shortages.

== Belgium ==
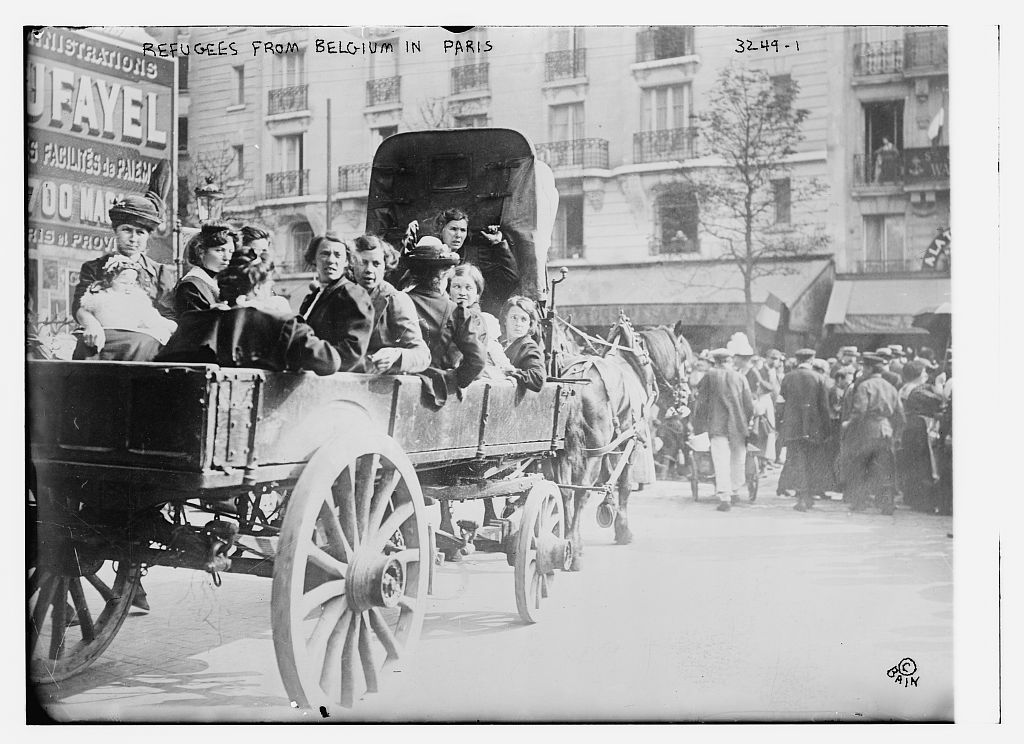
Belgian refugees in Paris, 1914

Nearly all of Belgium was occupied by the Germans, but the government and army escaped and fought the war on a narrow slice of the Western Front. The German invaders treated any resistance—such as sabotaging rail lines—as illegal and immoral, and shot the offenders and burned buildings in retaliation. The German army executed over 6,500 French and Belgian civilians between August and November 1914, usually in near-random large-scale shootings of civilians ordered by junior German officers. The German Army destroyed 15,000-20,000 buildings—most famously the university library at Louvain (Leuven)—and generated a refugee wave of over a million people. Over half the German regiments in Belgium were involved in major incidents. Thousands of workers were shipped to Germany to work in factories. British propaganda dramatizing the Rape of Belgium attracted much attention in the US, while Berlin said it was legal and necessary because of the threat of "franc-tireurs" (guerrillas) like those in France in 1870. The British and French magnified the reports and disseminated them at home and in the US, where they played a major role in dissolving support for Germany.

The Germans left Belgium stripped and barren. They shipped machinery to Germany while destroying factories. After the atrocities of the first few weeks, German civil servants took control and were generally correct, albeit strict and severe. There was no violent resistance movement, but there was a large-scale spontaneous passive resistance of a refusal to work for the benefit of German victory. Belgium was heavily industrialized; while farms operated and small shops stayed open, most large establishments shut down or drastically reduced their output. The faculty closed the universities; publishers shut down most newspapers. Most Belgians "turned the four war years into a long and extremely dull vacation", says Kiossmann.

Neutrals led by the United States set up the Commission for Relief in Belgium, headed by American engineer Herbert Hoover. It shipped in large quantities of food and medical supplies, which it tried to reserve for civilians and keep out of the hands of the Germans. Many businesses collaborated with the Germans, and some women cohabitated with their men. They were treated roughly in a wave of popular violence in November and December 1918. The government set up judicial proceedings to punish the collaborators. In 1919 the king organized a new ministry and introduced universal male suffrage. The Socialists—mostly poor workers—benefited more than the more middle class Catholics and Liberals.

=== Belgian Congo ===
Rubber had long been the main export; production levels held up but its importance fell from 77% of exports (by value) to only 15%. New resources were opened, especially copper mining in Katanga province. The British-owned Union Miniere company dominated the copper industry; it used a direct rail line to the sea at Beira. The war caused a heavy demand for copper, production soared from 997 tons in 1911 to 27,000 tons in 1917, then fell off to 19,000 tons in 1920. Smelters operated at Lubumbashi; before the war copper was sold to Germany; the British purchased all the wartime output, with the revenues going to the Belgian government in exile. Diamond and gold mining expanded during the war. The British firm of Lever Brothers greatly expanded the palm oil business during the war, and there was an increased output of cocoa, rice and cotton. New rail and steamship lines opened to handle the expanded export traffic.

== France ==
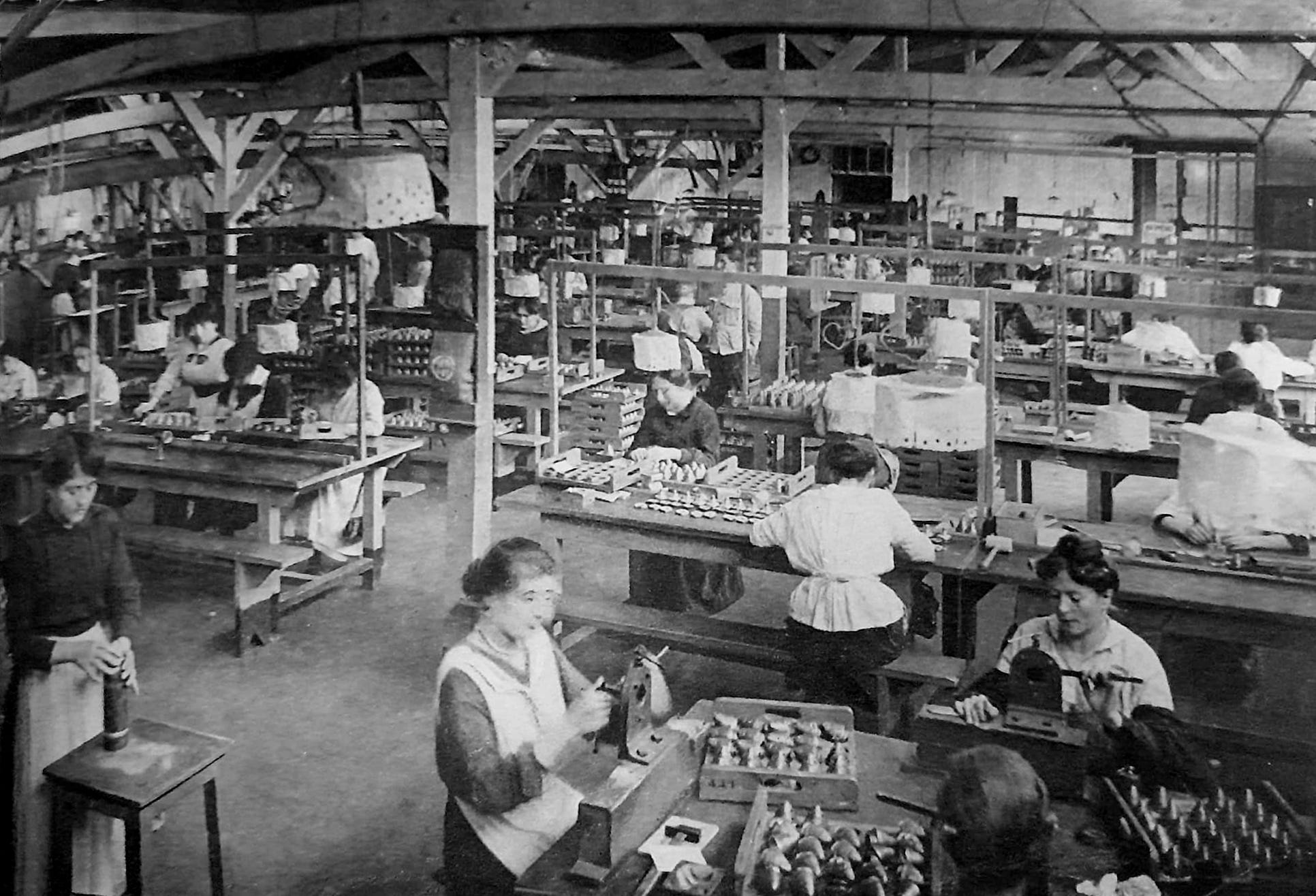
Production of rocket warheads in the department of Seine-Maritime, 1914

Many French intellectuals welcomed the war to avenge the humiliation of defeat and loss of territory to Germany following the Franco-Prussian War of 1871. Only one major figure, novelist Romain Rolland retained his pacifist internationalist values; he moved to Switzerland. After Socialist leader Jean Jaurès, a pacifist, was assassinated at the start of the war, the French socialist movement abandoned its antimilitarist positions and joined the national war effort. Prime Minister Rene Viviani called for unity—for a "Union sacrée" ("Sacred Union"); France had few dissenters.

However, war-weariness was a major factor by 1917, even reaching the army, as soldiers were reluctant to attack—many threatened to mutiny—saying it was best to wait for the arrival of millions of Americans. The soldiers were protesting not just the futility of frontal assaults in the face of German machine guns but also degraded conditions at the front lines and home, especially infrequent leaves, poor food, the use of African and Asian colonials on the home front, and concerns about the welfare of their wives and children.

The industrial economy was badly hurt by the German invasion of major industrial areas in the northeast. While the occupied area in 1913 contained only 14% of France's industrial workers, it produced 58% of the steel, and 40% of the coal. Considerable relief came with the influx of American food, money and raw materials in 1917. The arrival of over a million American soldiers in 1918 brought heavy spending on food and construction materials. Labor shortages were in part alleviated by the use of volunteer and slave labor from the colonies.

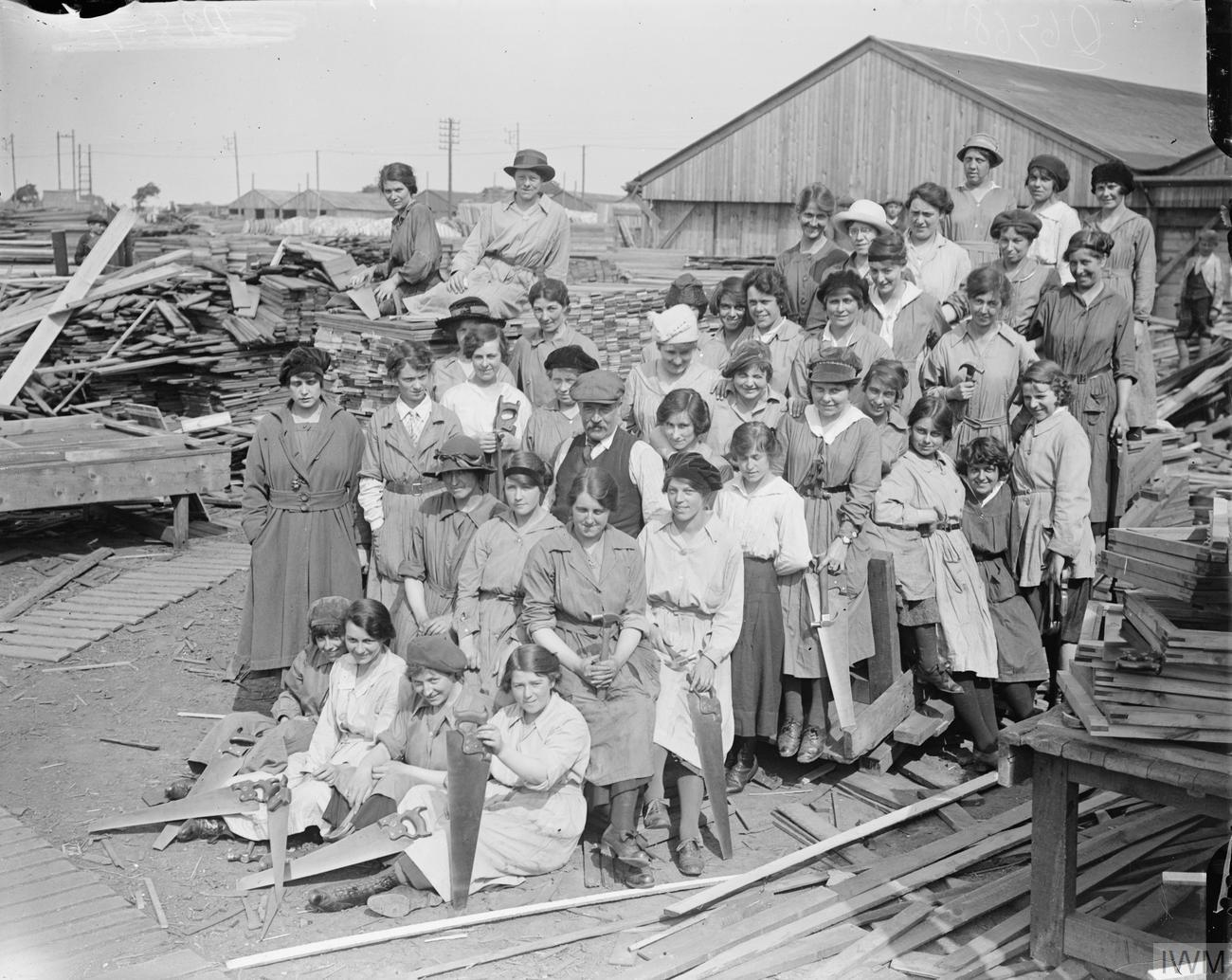
Female carpenters working at the Tarrant Hut Workshops, near Calais, 26 June 1918

The war damages amounted to about 113% of the GDP of 1913, chiefly the destruction of productive capital and housing. The national debt rose from 66% of GDP in 1913 to 170% in 1919, reflecting the heavy use of bond issues to pay for the war. Inflation was severe, with the franc losing over half its value against the British pound.

The World War ended a golden era for the press. Their younger staff members were drafted and male replacements could not be found (women were not considered). Rail transportation was rationed and less paper and ink came in, and fewer copies could be shipped out. Inflation raised the price of newsprint, which was always in short supply. The cover price went up, circulation fell and many of the 242 dailies published outside Paris closed down. The government set up the Interministerial Press Commission to closely supervise newspapers. A separate agency imposed tight censorship that led to blank spaces where news reports or editorials were disallowed. The dailies sometimes were limited to only two pages instead of the usual four, leading one satirical paper to try to report the war news in the same spirit:

War News. A half-zeppelin threw half its bombs on half-time combatants, resulting in one-quarter damaged. The zeppelin, halfways-attacked by a portion of half-anti aircraft guns, was half destroyed."

Georges Clemenceau became prime minister in November 1917, a time of defeatism and acrimony. Italy was on the defensive, Russia had surrendered. Civilians were angry, as rations fell short and the threat of German air raids grew. Clemenceau realized his priority was to restore civilian morale. He arrested Joseph Caillaux, a former French prime minister, for openly advocating peace negotiations. He won all-party support to fight to victory calling for "la guerre jusqu'au bout" (war until the end).

== Russia ==
Tsarist Russia was being torn apart in 1914 and was not prepared to fight a modern war. The industrial sector was small, finances were poor, the rural areas could barely feed themselves. Repeated military failures and bureaucratic ineptitude soon turned large segments of the population against the government. Control of the Baltic Sea by the German fleet, and of the Black Sea by combined German and Ottoman forces prevented Russia from importing supplies or exporting goods. By the middle of 1915 the impact of the war was demoralizing. Food and fuel supplies grew scarce, war casualties kept climbing and inflation was mounting. Strikes increased among low-paid factory workers, and the peasants, who wanted land reforms, were restless. Meanwhile, elite distrust of the incompetent decision making at the highest levels was deepened when a semiliterate mystic, Grigory Rasputin, gained enormous influence over the Tsar and his wife until he was assassinated in 1916. Major strikes broke out early in 1917 and the army sided with the strikers in the February Revolution. The tsar abdicated. The liberal reformer Alexander Kerensky came to power in July, but in the October Revolution Lenin and the Bolsheviks took control. In early 1918 they signed the Treaty of Brest-Litovsk that made Germany dominant in Eastern Europe, while Russia plunged into years of civil war.

While the central bureaucracy was overwhelmed and under-led, Fallows shows that localities sprang into action motivated by patriotism, pragmatism, economic self-interest, and partisan politics. Food distribution was the main role of the largest network, called the "Union of Zemstvos." It also set up hospitals and refugee stations.

== Italy ==
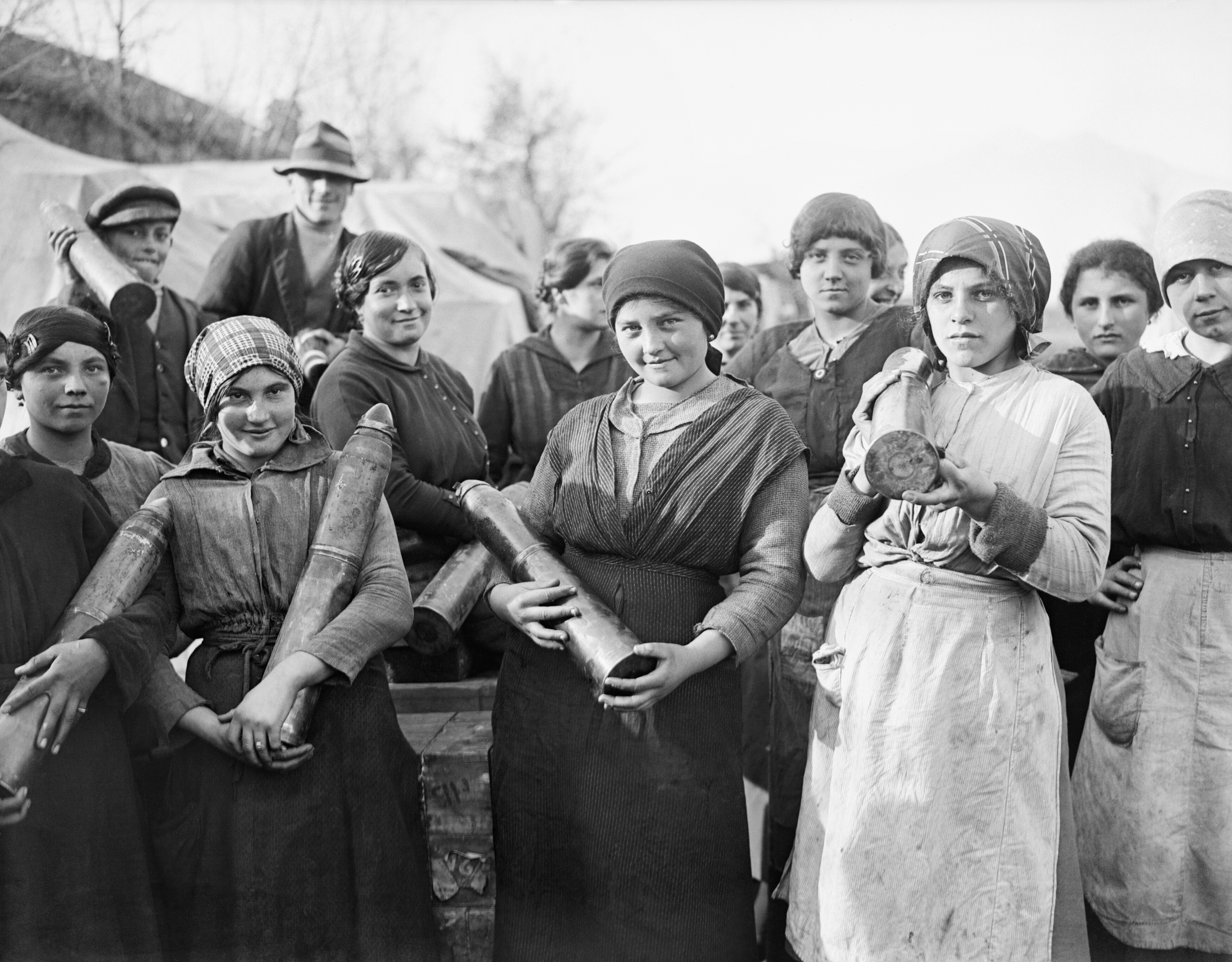
Italian women employed by the British Army unloading artillery ammunition at a railhead dump in northern Italy, 1918

Italy decided not to honor its Triple Alliance with Germany and Austria, and initially remained neutral. Public opinion in Italy was sharply divided, with Catholics and socialists calling for peace. However nationalists saw their opportunity to gain their "irredenta" – that is, the border regions that were controlled by Austria. The nationalists won out, and in April 1915, the Italian government secretly agreed to the London Pact in which Britain and France promised that if Italy would declare war on Austria, it would receive its territorial rewards. The Italian army of 875,000 men was poorly led and lacked heavy artillery and machine guns. The industrial base was too small to provide adequate amounts of modern equipment, and the old-fashioned rural base did not produce much of a food surplus. The war stalemated with a dozen indecisive battles on a very narrow front along the Isonzo River, where the Austrians held the high ground. In 1916, Italy declared war on Germany, which provided significant aid to the Austrians. Some 650,000 Italian soldiers died and 950,000 were wounded, while the economy required large-scale Allied funding to survive.

Before the war the government had ignored labor issues, but now it had to intervene to mobilize war production. With the main working-class Socialist party reluctant to support the war effort, strikes were frequent and cooperation was minimal, especially in the Socialist strongholds of Piedmont and Lombardy. The government imposed high wage scales, as well as collective bargaining and insurance schemes. Many large firms expanded dramatically. For example, the workforce at the Ansaldo munitions company grew from 6,000 to 110,000 workers as it manufactured 10,900 artillery pieces, 3,800 warplanes, 95 warships and 10 million artillery shells. At Fiat the workforce grew from 4,000 to 40,000. Inflation doubled the cost of living. Industrial wages kept pace but not wages for farm workers. Discontent was high in rural areas since so many men were taken for service, industrial jobs were unavailable, wages grew slowly and inflation was just as bad.

Italy blocked serious peace negotiations, staying in the war primarily to gain new territory. The Treaty of St. Germain awarded the victorious Italian nation the Southern half of the County of Tyrol, Trieste, Istria, and the city of Zadar. Italy did not receive other territories promised by the Pact of London, so this victory was considered "mutilated". In 1922 Italy formally annexed the Dodecanese (Possedimenti Italiani dell'Egeo), that she had occupied during the previous war with Turkey.

== United States ==
President Woodrow Wilson took full control of foreign policy, declaring neutrality but warning Germany that the resumption of unrestricted submarine warfare against American ships would mean war. Wilson's mediation efforts failed; likewise, the peace efforts sponsored by industrialist Henry Ford went nowhere. Germany decided to take the risk and try to win by cutting off Britain; the US declared war in April 1917. America had the largest industrial, financial and agricultural base of any of the great powers, but it took 12–18 months to fully reorient it to the war effort. American money, food and munitions flowed freely to Europe from spring 1917, but troops arrived slowly. The US Army in 1917 was small and poorly equipped.

Navy poster by Howard Chandler Christy

The draft began in spring 1917 but volunteers were also accepted. Four million men and thousands of women joined the services for the duration. By summer 1918 American soldiers under General John J. Pershing arrived in France at the rate of 10,000 a day, while Germany was unable to replace its losses. The result was an Allied victory in November 1918.

Propaganda campaigns directed by the government shaped the public mood toward patriotism and voluntary purchases of war bonds. The Committee on Public Information (CPI) controlled war information and provided pro-war propaganda, with the assistance of the private American Protective League and tens of thousands of local speakers. The Sedition Act of 1918 criminalized any expression of opinion that used "disloyal, profane, scurrilous or abusive language" about the US government, flag or armed forces. The most prominent opponents of the war were Wobblies and Socialists, many of whom were convicted of deliberately impeding the war effort and were sentenced to prison, including the Socialist presidential candidate Eugene Debs.

Woodrow Wilson played the central role in defining the Allied war aims in 1917–1918 (although the US never officially joined the Allies). He demanded Germany depose the Kaiser and accept the terms of his Fourteen Points. Wilson dominated the 1919 Paris Peace Conference but Germany was treated harshly by the Allies in the Treaty of Versailles (1919) as Wilson put all his hopes in the new League of Nations. Wilson refused to compromise with Senate Republicans over the issue of Congressional power to declare war, and the Senate rejected the Treaty and the League.

== Germany ==
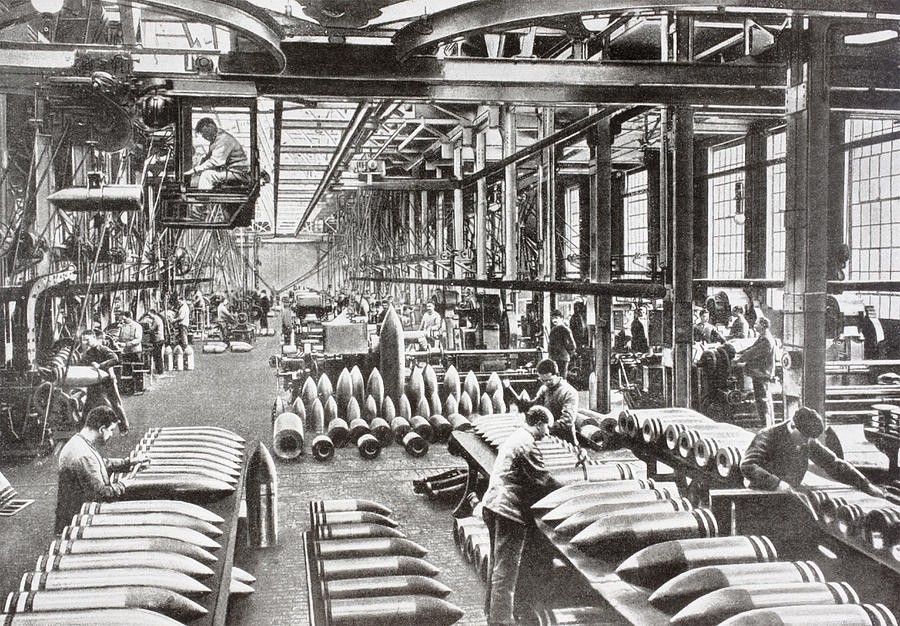
Interior of the Krupp steelworks in Essen, Germany, 1 December 1914

By 1915 the British naval blockade had cut off food imports and conditions deteriorated rapidly on the home front, with severe food shortages reported in all urban areas. The causes included the transfer of so many farmers and food workers into the military, combined with the overburdened railroad system, a shortage of coal, and the British blockade that cut off imports from abroad. The winter of 1916–1917 was known as the "turnip winter" (de:Steckrübenwinter), because that vegetable, which was usually fed to livestock, was used by people as a substitute for potatoes and meat, which were increasingly scarce. Thousands of soup kitchens were opened to feed the hungry people, who grumbled that the farmers were keeping the food for themselves. Even the army had to cut the rations for soldiers. Compared to peacetime, about 474,000 additional civilians died, chiefly because malnutrition had weakened the body. According to historian William H. MacNeil:

By 1917, after three years of war, the various groups and bureaucratic hierarchies which had been operating more or less independently of one another in peacetime (and not infrequently had worked at cross purposes) were subordinated to one (and perhaps the most effective) of their number: the General Staff. Military officers controlled civilian government officials, the staffs of banks, cartels, firms, and factories, engineers and scientists, workingmen, farmers-indeed almost every element in German society; and all efforts were directed in theory and in large degree also in practice to forwarding the war effort.

Morale of both civilians and soldiers continued to sink, but using the slogan of "sharing scarcity", the German bureaucracy ran an efficient rationing system nevertheless.

=== Political revolution ===
The end of October 1918 saw the outbreak of the German Revolution of 1918–19 as units of the German Navy refused to set sail for a last, large-scale operation in a war which they saw as good as lost (→Kiel mutiny). By 3 November, the revolt had spread to other cities and states of the country, in many of which workers' and soldiers' councils were established (→ German Revolution of 1918–19). Meanwhile, Hindenburg and the senior commanders had lost confidence in Kaiser Wilhelm II and his government.

The Kaiser and all German ruling princes abdicated. On 9 November 1918, the Social Democrat Philipp Scheidemann (1865–1939) proclaimed a Republic. On 11 November, the armistice ended the war with a total defeat for Germany. The Rhineland was occupied by the Allies (until 1923/1930).

== Austria-Hungary ==
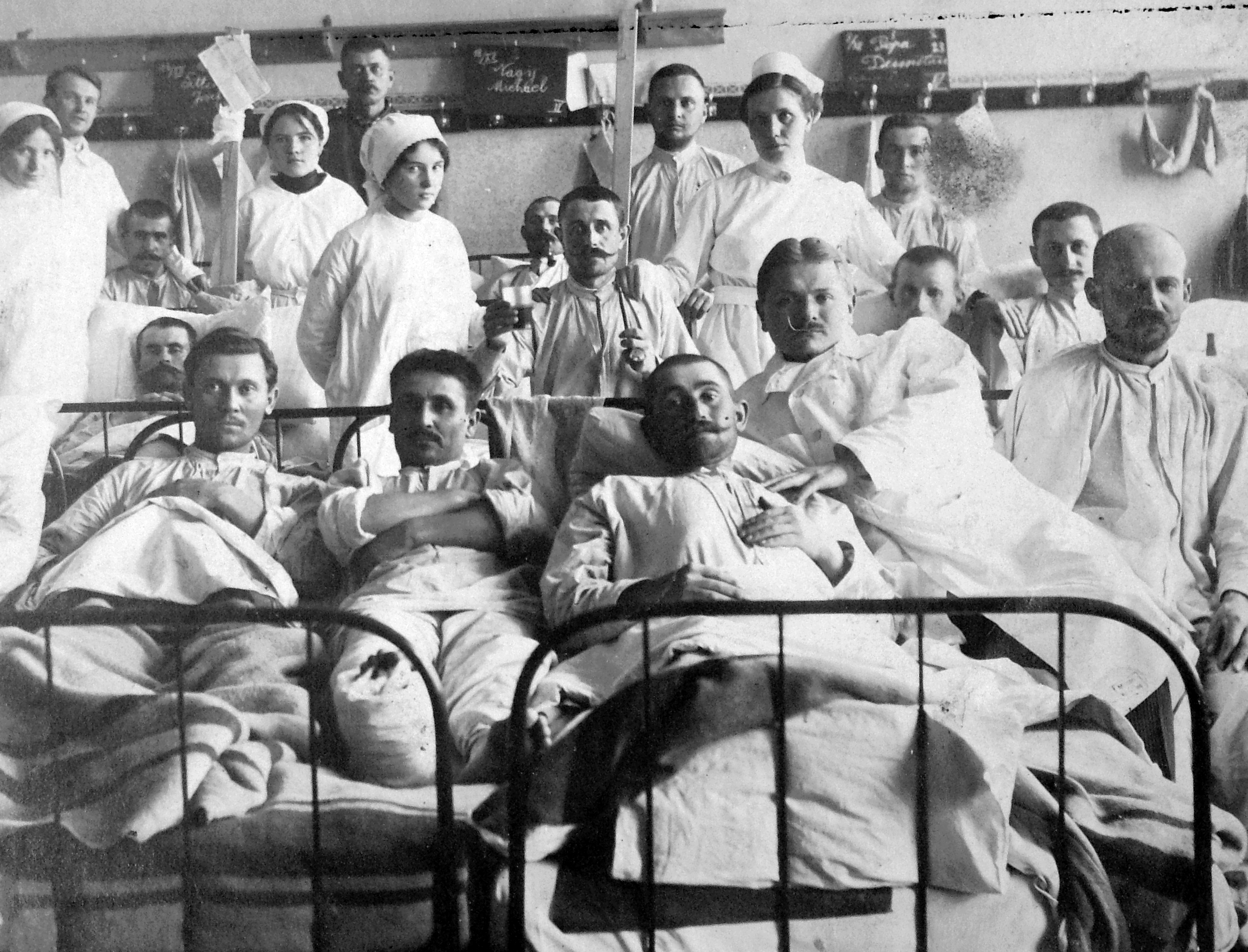
Nurses and wounded soldiers in an Austro-Hungarian military hospital, 1918

The heavily rural Empire did have a small industrial base, but its major contribution was manpower and food. Nevertheless, Austria-Hungary was more urbanized (25%) than its actual opponents in the First World War, like the Russian Empire (13.4%), Serbia (13.2%) or Romania (18.8%). Furthermore, the Austro-Hungarian Empire had also a more industrialized economy and higher GDP per capita than the Kingdom of Italy, which was economically the far most developed actual opponent of the Empire. On the home front, food grew scarcer and scarcer, as did heating fuel. The hog population fell 90 percent, as the dwindling supplies of ham and bacon were consumed by the Army. Hungary, with its heavy agricultural base, was somewhat better fed. Morale fell every year, and the diverse nationalities gave up on the Empire and looked for ways to establish their own nation states.

Inflation soared, from an index of 129 in 1914 to 1589 in 1918, wiping out the cash savings of the middle-class. In terms of war damage to the economy, the war used up about 20 percent of the GDP. The dead soldiers amounted to about four percent of the 1914 labor force, and the wounded ones to another six percent. Compared all the major countries in the war, Austria's death and casualty rate was toward the high-end.

Whereas the German army realized it needed close cooperation from the home front, Habsburg officers saw themselves as entirely separate from the civilian world, and superior to it. When they occupied productive areas, such as Romania, they seized food stocks and other supplies for their own purposes, and blocked any shipments intended for civilians back in the Austro-Hungarian Empire. The result was that the officers lived well, as the civilians began to starve. Vienna even transferred training units to Serbia and Poland for the sole purpose of feeding them. In all, the Army obtained about 15 percent of its cereal needs from occupied territories.

== Ottoman Empire ==
The Ottoman Empire had long been the "sick man of Europe" and by 1914 it had been driven out of nearly all of Europe, and had lost its influence in North Africa. It still controlled 23 million people, of whom 17 million were in modern-day Turkey, three million in Syria, Lebanon and Palestine, and 2.5 million in Mesopotamia (modern-day Iraq). Another 5.5 million people were under nominal Ottoman rule in the Arabian Peninsula.

A faction of the Young Turk movement, the Committee of Union and Progress, turned the Ottoman Empire into a one-party-state after a coup in 1913; they mobilized the country's society for war, employing numerous political and economic reforms. The Unionists, through its Committee of National Defense, fostered pan-Turkish nationalism based in Anatolia. The Young Turks created new organizations, such as the Ottoman Red Crescent Society, the Ottoman Navy League, and the Committee of National Defense, to extend their political influence to the middle class, to mobilize support for the war effort and to construct a Turkish identity. When the war broke out the sultan, in his capacity, as caliph, issued a jihad, calling all Muslims in Egypt, India and other Allied territories to revolt against their Christian rulers. Very few listened. Meanwhile, many Arabs turned against the Turks and rose in rebellion in the Arab Revolt.

Reacting to fears that the Armenians could be a potential fifth column for the Russian army, the CUP forcibly evacuated the Armenians from eastern Anatolia, regardless of the 600,000 or more lives lost in the Armenian genocide. In October 1918, as the Allied powers were gaining ground on Macedonian and Palestine Fronts, the Three Pashas, the ruling Unionist triumvirate fled into exile. The Armistice of Mudros ended World War I between the Allied powers and the Ottoman Empire, however the Turks would again see themselves in the battlefield with the Allies in the Turkish War of Independence.

=== Economic impacts ===
The war effort in the Ottoman Empire was felt heavily on those living in the Empire. As the empire was blockaded by the Entente powers and the transportation system was largely inefficient it faced enormous challenges accommodating both civilians and the military.

In the Ottoman Empire during World War 1, virtually all male Ottoman citizens were expected to serve in the military. In the years prior to the war, many exceptions that existed were eliminated such as exemptions for: students, non-Muslims and those who lived in the national capitol. High levels of desertion despite being threatened with death as a punishment were reported between enlistment and training due to the length in time between the two stages along with how long it took the process the incredibly large number of recruits. One could get out of military service by paying a fee. The new conscription policies were unpopular.

== Balkans ==
=== Serbia ===
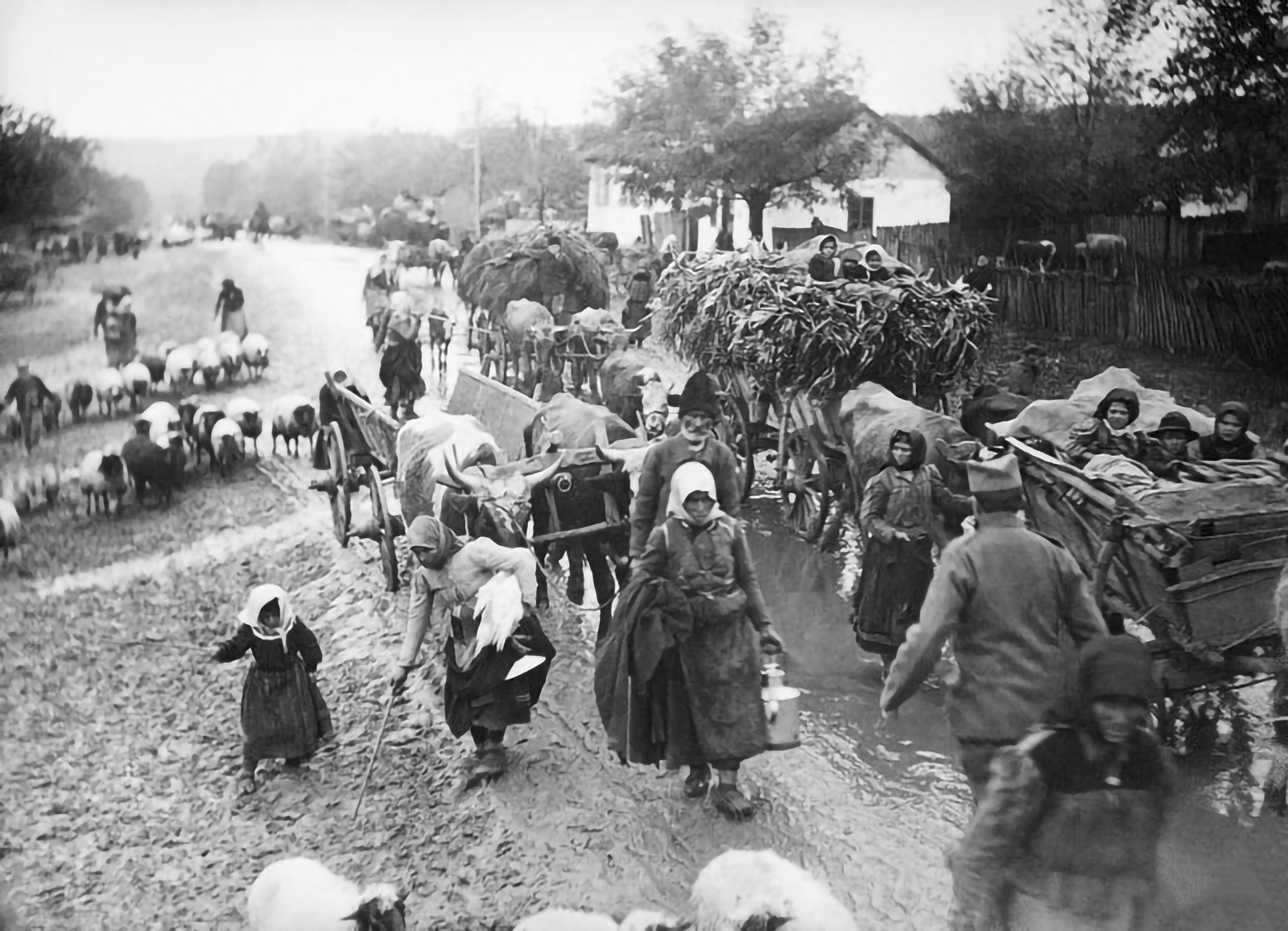
Serbian refugees and troops during the retreat to the Adriatic Sea coast, November 1915

Despite its small size and population of 4.6 million, Serbia had the most effective manpower mobilization of the war, and had a highly professional officer corps. It called 350,000 men to arms, of whom 185,000 were in combat units. Nevertheless, the casualties and expenditure of munitions in the Balkan Wars left Serbia depleted and dependent on France for supplies. Austria invaded twice in 1914 and was turned back after both armies suffered very heavy losses. Many captured Austrian soldiers were Slavic and joined the Serbian cause. The year 1915 was peaceful in the sense there was no military action, but food supplies were dangerously low and a series of deadly epidemics hit, especially typhus. The death toll from epidemics was about 100,000 civilians, 35,000 soldiers, and 30,000 prisoners of war.

In late 1915, however, German generals were given control and invaded Serbia with Austrian and Bulgarian forces. The Serbian army hastily retreated west but only 70,000 made it through, and Serbia became an occupied land. Disease was rampant, but the Austrians were pragmatic and paid well for food supplies, so conditions were not harsh. Instead Austria tried to depoliticize Serbia, to minimize violence, and to integrate the country into the Empire. Nevertheless, Serbian nationalism remained defiant and many young men slipped out to help rebuild the Serbian army in exile.

France proved an invaluable ally during the war and its armies, together with reorganized Serbian units, moved up from Greece in 1918 and liberated Serbia, Montenegro, and Vojvodina.

The war ended the very heavy death toll, which saw 615,000 of Serbia's 707,000 soldiers killed, along with 600,000 civilian dead. The death toll in Montenegro was also high. Serbia achieved its political goals by forming the new Kingdom of the Serbs, Croats, and Slovenes (later Yugoslavia) in 1918. It proved more difficult to create the new-model "Yugoslav" as an exemplar of a united nation containing diverse ethnicities, languages and religions. For example, Montenegro was included but, fearful of losing its own cultural traditions, there was a revolt there that the Serbian army crushed.

=== Bulgaria ===
Bulgaria, a poor rural nation of 4.5 million people, sought to acquire Macedonia, but when it tried it suffered defeat in 1913 in the Second Balkan War. In the First World War Bulgaria at first stayed neutral. However its leaders still hoped to acquire Macedonia, which was controlled by an Ally, Serbia. In 1915, joining the Central Powers seemed the best route. Bulgaria mobilized a very large army of 800,000 men, using equipment supplied by Germany. The Bulgarian-German-Austrian invasion of Serbia in 1915 provided a quick victory, but by the end of that year Bulgaria was also fighting the British and French—as well as the Romanians in 1916 and the Greeks in 1917. Bulgaria was ill-prepared for a long war; the absence of so many soldiers sharply reduced agricultural output. Much of its best food was smuggled out to feed lucrative black-markets elsewhere. By 1918 the soldiers were not only short of basic equipment like boots, but they were being fed mostly corn bread with a little meat. Germany increasingly took control, and Bulgarian relations with its ally the Ottoman Empire soured. The Allied offensive in September 1918 destroyed the remnants of Bulgarian military power and civilian morale. Troops mutinied and peasants revolted, demanding peace. By that month's end Bulgaria signed an armistice, giving up its conquests and its military hardware. The Bulgarian Czar abdicated and Bulgaria's war ended. The Treaty of Neuilly-sur-Seine in 1919 stripped Bulgaria of its conquests, reduced its army to 20,000 men, and demanded reparations of £100 million.

=== Greece ===
Greece had been exhausted by the Balkan wars and sought to remain neutral, but its strategic position as the gateway to the Balkans made that impossible. In the National Schism, King Constantine I, a traditionalist who had German ties, battled with his modernizing liberal Prime Minister Eleftherios Venizelos, who was sympathetic to the Allies. Venizélos with Allied support, set up the short-lived Greek "state" of Salonica, from October 1916 to June 1917. An Allied blockade forced the king to abdicate in June 1917. Venizélos was now in full control and Greece sided with the Allies and declared war. Greece served as a staging base for large numbers of French, Serbian and other Allied units. By war's end the Greek army numbered 300,000 and had about 5,000 casualties. The schism between modernizers and traditionalists did not heal and for decades was the polarizing factor in Greek politics.

== Asia ==
=== China ===
The warlord Duan Qirui was the most powerful leader in China. He dissolved the parliament and declared war on Germany and Austria-Hungary on 13 August 1917. Enemy nationals were detained and their assets seized. Around 175,000 Chinese workers volunteered for well-paid positions in the labor battalions that served the Allies behind the lines in France, and Africa and on supply ships. Some 10,000 died, including over 500 on ships sunk by U-boats. No soldiers were sent overseas.

=== Japan ===
Japan's military seized German possessions in the Pacific and East Asia, but there was no large-scale mobilization of the economy. Foreign minister Kato Takaaki and Prime Minister Okuma Shigenobu wanted to use the opportunity to expand Japanese influence in China. They enlisted Sun Yat-sen (1866–1925), then in exile in Japan, but they had little success. The Imperial Navy, a nearly autonomous bureaucratic institution, made its own decision to undertake expansion in the Pacific. It captured Germany's Micronesian territories north of the equator, and ruled the islands until 1921. The operation gave the navy a rationale for enlarging its budget to double the army budget and expanding the fleet. The Navy thus gained significant political influence over national and international affairs.

Inflation caused rice prices to quadruple, leading to small-scale riots all across the country in 1918. The government made thousands of arrests and prevented the newspapers from reporting the riots. Some 250,000 people died in the Spanish flu epidemic in late 1918. The death rate was much lower than other major countries because some immunity had developed from a mild outbreak earlier; public health officials successfully warned people to avoid contact; and the use of inoculation, herbals, masks, and gargling.

== See also ==
- Diplomatic history of World War I
- Economic history of World War I
- Propaganda in World War I
  - British propaganda during World War I
  - Italian propaganda during World War I
- Opposition to World War I
- World War I casualties
- World War I in popular culture
  - World War I in literature
  - Fiction based on World War I
  - British women's literature of World War I

== Primary sources and year books ==
- Gooch, G. P. Recent Revelations Of European Diplomancy (1940), 475pp summarizes published memoirs by main participants
- Marwick, Arthur, and W. Simpson, eds. War, Peace and Social Change - Europe 1900-1955 - Documents I: 1900–1929 (1990)
- Pollard, Sidney and Colin Holmes, eds. Documents of European Economic History Volume 3 The End of the Old Europe 1914–1939 (1973) pp 1–89; 33 short excerpts
- Shevin-Coetzee, Marilyn, and Frans Coetzee, eds. World War One and European Society (1995).
- Shevin-Coetzee, Marilyn, and Frans Coetzee, eds. World War I: A History in Documents (2002) ISBN 0199731527
- New International Year Book 1913 (1914) Comprehensive coverage of world affairs; strong on economics; 867pp
- New International Year Book 1914 (1915), 913pp
- New International Year Book 1915 (1916), 791pp
- New International Year Book 1916 (1917), 938pp
- New International Year Book 1917 (1918), 904 pp
- New International Year Book 1918 (1919), 904 pp
- New International Year Book 1919 (1920), 744pp
- New International Year Book 1920 (1921), 844 pp
- New International Year Book 1921 (1922), 848 pp
