= Economic history of World War I =

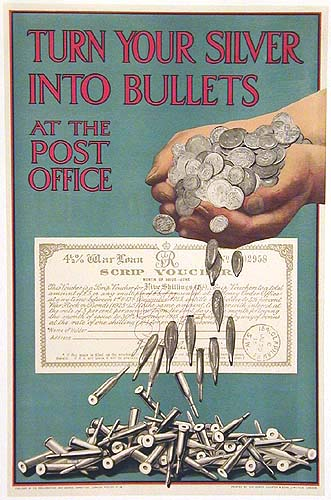
British poster encouraging investment in war bonds

The economic history of World War I covers the methods used by the First World War (1914–1918), as well as related postwar issues such as war debts and reparations. It also covers the economic mobilization of labour, industry, and agriculture leading to economic failure. It deals with economic warfare such as the blockade of Germany, and with some issues closely related to the economy, such as military issues of transportation. For a broader perspective see home front during World War I. As airplanes were not in use at the time, transportation became much more costly.

All of the powers in 1914 expected a short war; none had made any economic preparations for a long war, such as stockpiling food or critical raw materials. The longer the war went on, the more the advantages went to the Allies, with their larger, deeper, more versatile economies and better access to global supplies. As Stephen Broadberry and Mark Harrison conclude, once stalemate set in late in 1914: "The greater Allied capacity for taking risks, absorbing the cost of mistakes, replacing losses, and accumulating overwhelming quantitative superiority should eventually have turned the balance against Germany".

The Allies had much more potential wealth they could spend on the war. One estimate (using 1913 US dollars) is that the Allies spent $147 billion on the war and the Central Powers only $61 billion, but Germany concentrated the largest industrial conglomerate in the Rhineland region. Among the Allies, Britain and its Empire spent $47 billion and the U.S. $27 billion (the U.S. joined after the war started) while among the Central Powers, Germany spent $45 billion.

Total war demanded total mobilization of all the nation's resources for a common goal. Manpower had to be channeled into the front lines (all the powers except the United States and Britain had large trained reserves designed just for that). Behind the lines labour power had to be redirected away from less necessary activities that were luxuries during total war. In particular, vast munitions industries had to be built up to provide shells, guns, warships, uniforms, airplanes, and a hundred other weapons both old and new. Agriculture had to provide food for both civilians and for soldiers (some of whom had been farmers and needed to be replaced by women, children and the elderly who now did the work without animal assistance) and for horses to move supplies. Transportation, in general, was a challenge, especially when Britain and Germany each tried to intercept merchant ships headed for the enemy. Finance was a special challenge. Germany financed the Central Powers. Britain financed the Allies until 1916 when it ran out of money and had to borrow from the United States. The U.S. took over the financing of the Allies in 1917 with loans that it insisted be repaid after the war. The victorious Allies looked to defeated Germany in 1919 to pay reparations that would cover some of their costs. Above all, it was essential to conduct the mobilization in such a way that the short term confidence of the people was maintained, the long-term power of the political establishment was upheld, and the long-term economic health of the nation was preserved.

== Europe ==
Gross domestic product (GDP) increased for three Allies (Britain, Italy, and the U.S.), but decreased in France and Russia, in the neutral Netherlands, and in the three main Central Powers. The shrinkage in GDP in Austria-Hungary, Russia, France, and the Ottoman Empire reached 30 to 40%. In Austria, for example, most pigs were slaughtered, so at war's end there was no meat.

The Western Front quickly stabilized, with almost no movement of more than a few hundred yards. The greatest single expenditure on both sides was for artillery shells, the chief weapon in the war. Since the front was highly stable, both sides built elaborate railway networks that brought supplies within a mile or two of the front lines, with horse-drawn wagons used for the final deliveries. In the ten-month battle at Verdun, the French and Germans fired some 10 million shells in all, weighing 1.4 million tons of steel.

== Allies ==
The German counter-blockade with U-boats was defeated by the convoy system and massive American shipbuilding. Britain paid the war costs of most of its Allies until it ran out of money, then the US took over, funding those Allies and Britain as well.

=== United Kingdom ===
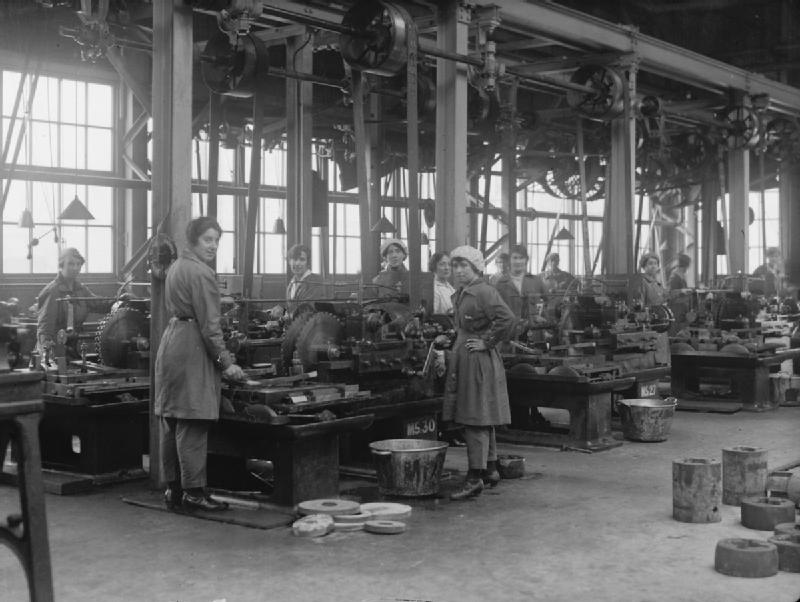
Women workers at the Royal Gun Factory, Woolwich Arsenal, London

The economy (in terms of GDP) grew about 7% from 1914 to 1918 despite the absence of so many men in the services; by contrast the German economy shrank 27%. The war saw a decline of civilian consumption, with a major reallocation to munitions. The government share of GDP soared from 8% in 1913 to 38% in 1918 (compared to 50% in 1943).

Despite fears in 1915-16 that munitions production was lagging, in the longer term the output was more than adequate. The annual output of artillery grew from 91 guns in 1914 to 8039 in 1918. Warplanes soared from 200 in 1914 to 3200 in 1918, while the production of machine guns went from 300 to 121,000. Early failures in munitions manufacturing led to full British government intervention in war production. These controls helped its industry produce nearly 4 million rifles, 250,000 machine guns, 52,000 aeroplanes, 2,800 tanks, 25,000 artillery pieces and over 170 million rounds of artillery shells by 1918.

In 1915, the Anglo-French Financial Commission agreed a $500 million loan from private American banks. By 1916, Britain was funding most of the Empire's war expenditures, all of Italy's and two thirds of the war costs of France and Russia, plus smaller nations as well. The gold reserves, overseas investments and private credit then ran out forcing Britain to borrow $4 billion from the U.S. Treasury in 1917–18. Shipments of American raw materials and food allowed Britain to feed itself and its army while maintaining her productivity. The financing was generally successful, as the City's strong financial position minimized the damaging effects of inflation, as opposed to much worse conditions in Germany. Overall consumer consumption declined 18% from 1914 to 1919.

Trade unions were encouraged as membership grew from 4.1 million in 1914 to 6.5 million in 1918, peaking at 8.3 million in 1920 before relapsing to 5.4 million in 1923. Women were available and many entered munitions factories and took other home front jobs vacated by men.

==== Energy ====
Light energy was a critical factor for the British war effort. Most of the energy supplies came from coal mines in Britain, where the issue was labour supply. Critical however was the flow of oil for ships, lorries and industrial use. There were no oil wells in Britain so everything was imported. The U.S. pumped two-thirds of the world's oil. In 1917, total British consumption was 827 million barrels, of which 85 percent was supplied by the United States, and 6 percent by Mexico. The great issue in 1917 was how many tankers would survive the German U-boats. Convoys and the construction of new tankers solved the German threat, while tight government controls guaranteed that all essential needs were covered. An Inter-Allied Petroleum Conference allocated American supplies to Britain, France and Italy.

An oil crisis occurred in Britain due to the 1917 German submarine campaign. Standard Oil of NJ, for example, lost 6 tankers (including the brand new John D. Archbold) between May and September. The only solution to the crisis lay with increased oil shipment from America. The Allies formed the Inter-Allied Petroleum Conference with USA, Britain, France, and Italy as the members. Standard and Royal Dutch/Shell ran it and made it work. The introduction of convoys as an antidote to the German U-boats and the joint management system by Standard Oil and Royal Dutch/Shell helped to solve the Allies' supply problems. The close working relationship that evolved was in marked contrast to the feud between the government and Standard Oil years earlier. In 1917 and 1918, there was increased domestic demand for oil partly due to the cold winter that created a shortage of coal. Inventories and imported oil from Mexico were used to close the gap. In January 1918, the U.S. Fuel Administrator ordered industrial plants east of Mississippi to close for a week to free up oil for Europe.

Fuel oil for the Royal Navy was the highest priority. In 1917, the Royal Navy consumed 12,500 tons a month, but had a supply of 30,000 tons a month from the Anglo-Persian Oil Company, using their oil wells in Persia.

==== Scotland ====
Clydebank shipyards before 1914 had been one of the busiest in the world, turning out more than a third of the entire British output. They expanded by a third during the war, primarily to produce destroyers. They additionally constructed two battlecruisers, HMS Repulse and HMS Hood. Confident of postwar expansion, the companies borrowed heavily to expand their facilities. But after the war, employment tumbled as the yards proved too big, too expensive, and too inefficient; in any case world demand was down. The most skilled craftsmen were especially hard hit, because there were few alternative uses for their specialized skills.

==== Ireland ====
Ireland was on the verge of civil war in 1914 after Parliament voted a home rule law that was intensely opposed by Unionists, especially those in Ulster. When the war broke out the law was suspended and Protestants gave very strong support for the war in terms of military service and industrial output.

Occurring during Ireland's Revolutionary period, the Irish Nationalist experience of the war was complex and its memory of it divisive. At the outbreak of the war, most Irish people, regardless of political affiliation, supported the war in much the same way as their British counterparts, and both nationalist and unionist leaders initially backed the British war effort. Their followers, both Catholic and Protestant, served extensively in the British forces, many in three specially raised divisions. Over 200,000 Irishmen fought in the war, in several theatres with 30,000 deaths. In 1916, supporters of Irish independence from the United Kingdom took the opportunity of the ongoing war to proclaim an Irish Republic and to defend it in an armed rebellion against British rule in Dublin. The rebellion was poorly planned and quickly suppressed. After summary Courts Martial, the British executed 15 of the prisoners which caused public opinion to surge in favour of independence. Britain's intention to impose conscription in Ireland in 1918 provoked widespread resistance and as a result remained unimplemented.

==== Dominions and British Empire ====
The Dominions and India all played major roles. The Asian and African colonies provided large numbers of civilian workers, as well as some soldiers. The Indian Army during World War I contributed a large number of divisions and independent brigades to the European, Mediterranean and the Middle East theatres of war. Over one million Indian troops served overseas, of whom 62,000 died and another 67,000 were wounded.

===== Canada =====
Canada was prosperous during the war but ethnic conflict escalated almost out of control. In terms of long-run economic trends, the war hardly affected the direction or the speed of change. The trajectory of the main economic factors, the business and financial system, and the technology continued on their way. Women temporarily took war jobs, and at the end of the war there was a great deal of unrest among union members and farmers for a few years.

===== Australia =====
The Australian Honour Flag, awarded to subscribers of the Australian Government's 7th War Loan in 1918

Billy Hughes, prime minister from October 1915, expanded the government's role in the economy, while dealing with intense debates over the issue of conscription. Historian Gerhard Fisher argues that the Hughes government aggressively promoted economic, industrial, and social modernization. However, Fischer also says it was done by means of exclusion and repression. He says the war turned a peaceful nation into "one that was violent, aggressive, angst- and conflict-ridden, torn apart by invisible front lines of sectarian division, ethnic conflict and socio-economic and political upheaval."

In 1914 the Australian economy was small but the population of five million was very nearly the most prosperous in the world per capita. The nation depended on the export of wool, mutton, wheat and minerals. London provided assurances that it would underwrite the war risk insurance for shipping in order to allow trade amongst the Empire to continue in the face of the German U-boat threat. London imposed controls so that no exports would wind up in German hands. The British government protected prices by buying Australian products even though the shortage of shipping meant that there was no chance that they would ever receive them. On the whole Australian commerce expanded. In terms of value, Australian exports rose almost 45 per cent, while the number of Australians employed in the manufacturing industry increased over 11 per cent. Iron mining and steel manufacture grew enormously. Inflation became a factor as consumer prices went up, while the cost of exports was deliberately kept lower than market value in an effort to prevent further inflationary pressures worldwide. As a result, the cost of living for many average Australians was increased.

The trade union movement, already powerful grew rapidly, though the movement split on the political question of conscription. Despite the considerable rises in the costs of many basic items, the government sought to stabilize wages, much to the anger of unionists. the average weekly wage during the war was increased by between 8–12 per cent, it was not enough to keep up with inflation and as a result there was considerable discontent amongst workers, to the extent that industrial action followed. Not all of these disputes were due to economic factors, and indeed in some part they were the result of violent opposition to the issue of conscription, which many trade unionists were opposed to. Nevertheless, the result was very disruptive and it has been estimated that between 1914 and 1918 there were 1,945 industrial disputes, resulting in 8,533,061 working days lost and £4,785,607 in lost wages.

The cost of the war was £377 million, of which 70% was borrowed and the rest came from taxes. Overall, the war had a significantly negative impact on the Australia economy. Real aggregate Gross Domestic Product (GDP) declined by 9.5 percent over the period 1914 to 1920, while the mobilization of personnel resulted in a 6 percent decline in civilian employment. Meanwhile, although population growth continued during the war years, it was only half that of the prewar rate. Per capita incomes also declined sharply, failing by 16 percent.

===== South Africa =====
South Africa's main economic role was in the supply of two-thirds of the gold production in the British Empire (most of the remainder came from Australia). When the war began Bank of England officials worked with the government of South Africa to block any gold shipments to Germany, and force the mine owners to sell only to the Treasury, at prices set by the Treasury. This facilitated purchases of munitions and food in the U.S. and other neutrals. By 1919 London lost control to the mining companies (which were now backed by the South African government). They wanted the higher prices and sales to New York that a free market would provide.

=== Belgium ===
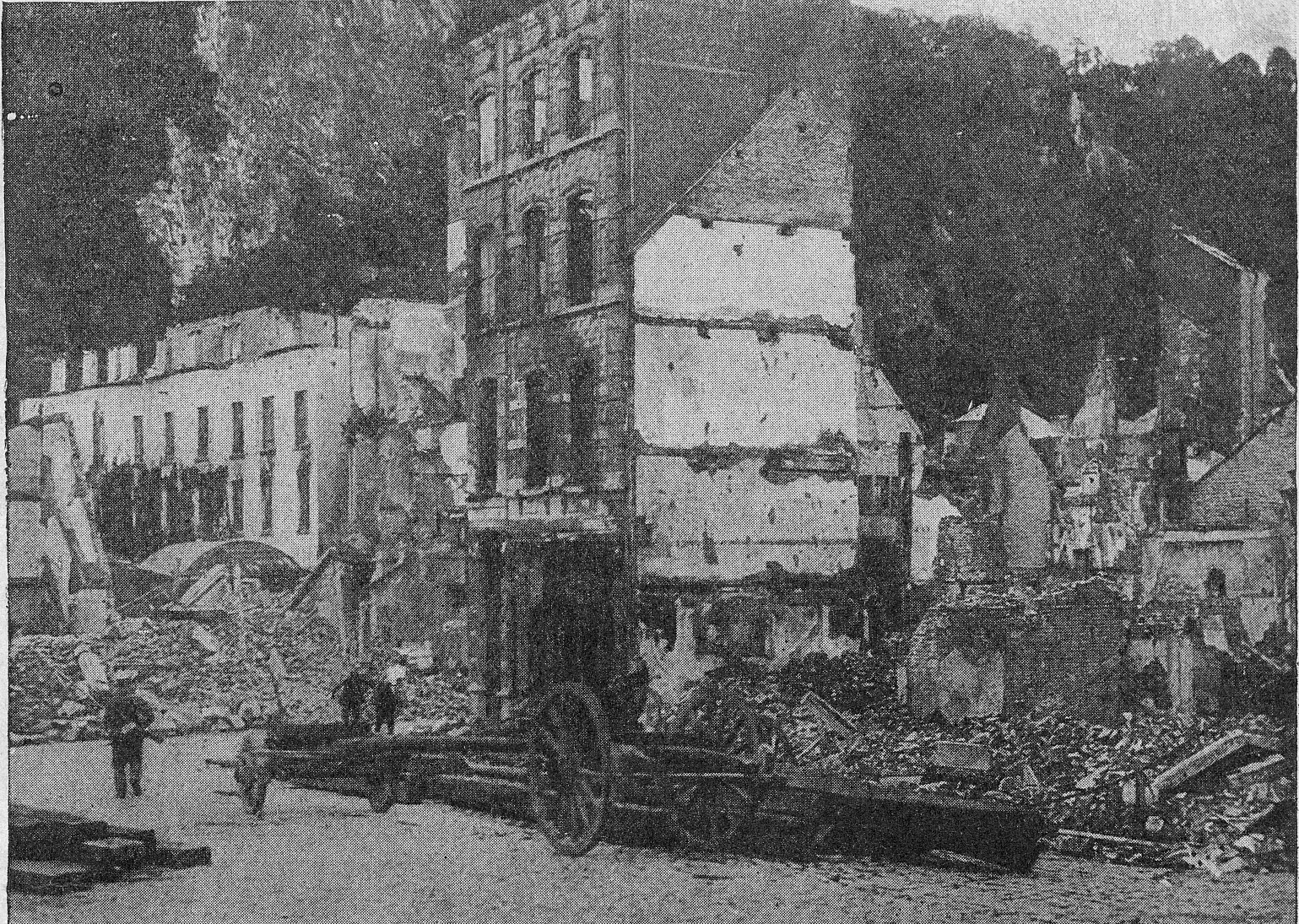
Destroyed houses in Dinant, 1915. Belgium sustained significant material damage, providing a major obstacle to its economic recovery after the war.

The Germans invaded Belgium at the start of the war and Belgium remained occupied for the entire war. There was both large-scale spontaneous militant and passive resistance. Over a 1.4 million refugees fled to France or to neutral Netherlands. Over half the German regiments in Belgium were involved in major incidents. After the atrocities by the German army in the first few weeks of the war, German civil servants took control and were generally correct, albeit strict and severe. Belgium was heavily industrialized; while farms operated and small shops stayed open some large establishments shut down or drastically reduced their output. The faculty closed the universities; many publishers shut down their newspapers. Most Belgians "turned the four war years into a long and extremely dull vacation," according to Kossmann. In 1916 Germany deported 120,000 men to work in Germany; this led to protests from neutral countries and they were returned. Germany then stripped some factories of useful machinery, and used the rest as scrap iron for its steel mills.

At the start of war, silver 5 franc coins were collected and melted down by the National Bank to augment its silver reserves. They were exchangeable for paper banknotes, and later zinc coins, although many demonetized silver coins were hoarded. With the German invasion, the National Bank's reserves were transferred to Antwerp and eventually to England where they were deposited at the Bank of England. Throughout the German occupation there was a shortage of official coins and banknotes in circulation, and so around 600 communes, local governments and companies issued their own unofficial "Necessity Money" to enable the continued functioning of the local economies. The Belgian franc was fixed at an exchange rate of 1 franc to 1.25 German mark, which was also introduced as legal tender.

Neutral countries led by the United States set up the Commission for Relief in Belgium, headed by American engineer Herbert Hoover. It shipped in large quantities of food and medical supplies, which it tried to reserve for civilians and keep out of the hands of the Germans. Many businesses collaborated with the Germans. The government set up judicial proceedings to punish the collaborators.

==== Belgian Congo ====
Rubber had long been the main export of the Belgian Congo and production levels held up during the war but its importance fell from 77% of exports (by value) to only 15%. New resources were opened, especially copper mining in Katanga Province. The Union Minière du Haut Katanga company dominated the copper industry, exporting its product along a direct rail line to the sea at Beira. The war caused a heavy demand for copper, and production soared from 997 tons in 1911 to 27,000 tons in 1917, then fell off to 19,000 tons in 1920. Smelters operate at Elisabethville. Before the war the copper was sold to Germany and, in order to prevent loss of capacity, the British purchased all the Congo's wartime output with the revenues going to the Belgian government in exile. Diamond and gold mining also expanded during the war. The Anglo-Dutch firm Lever Bros. greatly expanded the palm oil business during the war and there was an increased output of cocoa, rice and cotton. New rail and steamship lines opened to handle the expanded export traffic.

=== France ===
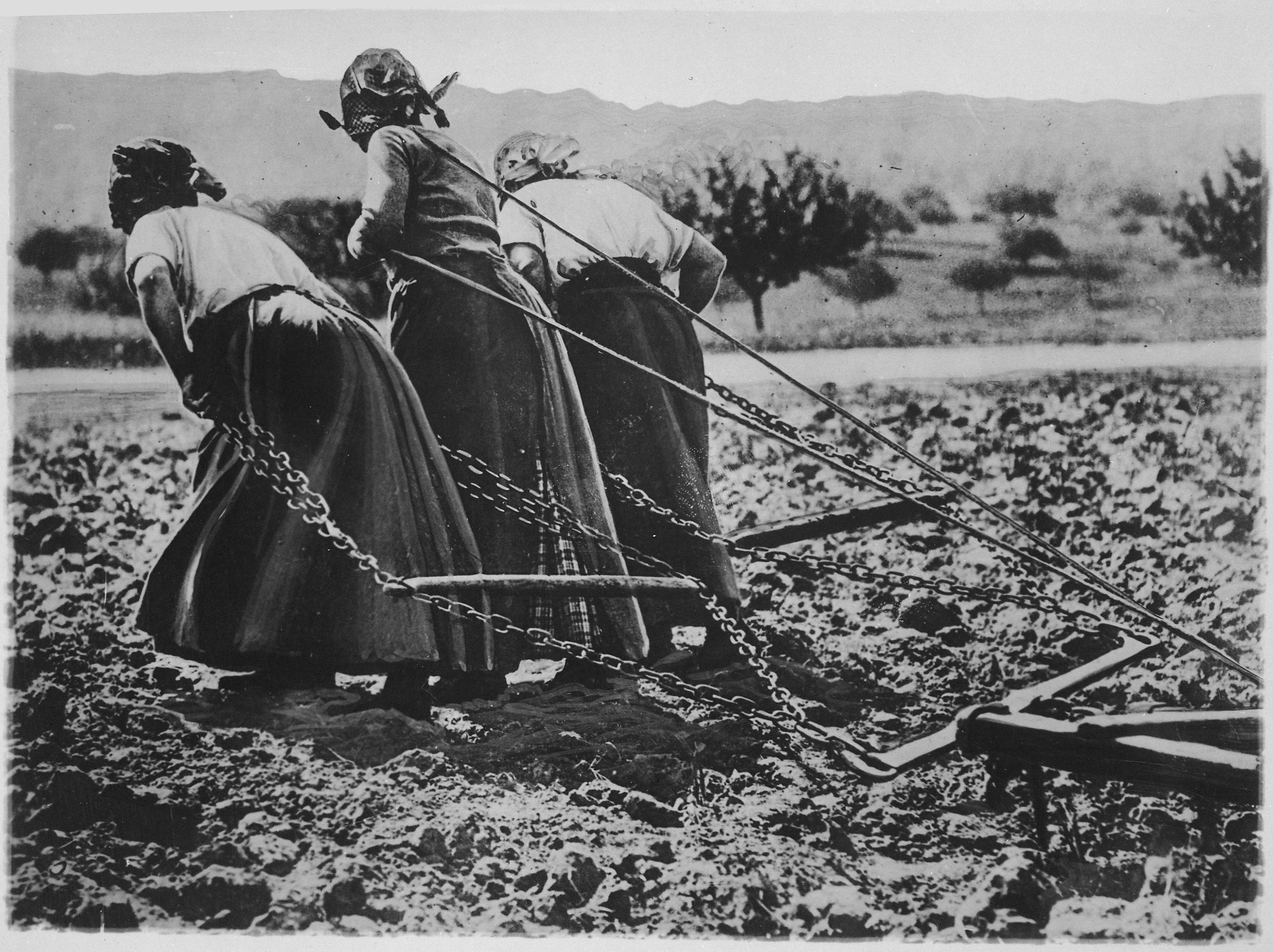
French photograph entitled "Heroic Women of France. Hitched to the plough, cultivating the soil. All agriculture rests upon their shoulders. Uncomplaining, with an attitude that amounts almost to religious exultation, the woman of France bears the burden.", c. 1917–20, extolling the female contribution to agriculture

The German invasion captured 40% of France's heavy industry in 1914, especially in steel and coal. French GDP in 1918 was 24% smaller than in 1913; since a third went into the war effort, the civilian standard of living fell by half. But thousands of little factories opened up across France, hiring women, youth, elderly, disabled veterans, and behind the lines soldiers. Algerian and Vietnamese laborers were brought in. Plants produced 200,000 75mm shells a day. The US provided much food, steel, coal and machine tools, and $3.6 billion in loans to finance it all; the British loaned another $3 billion.

Considerable relief came with the influx of American food, money and raw materials in 1917. The economy was supported after 1917 by American government loans which were used to purchase foods and manufactured goods. The arrival of over a million American soldiers in 1918 brought heavy spending for food and construction materials.

France's diverse regions suffered in different ways. While the occupied area in 1913 contained only 14% of France's industrial workers, it produced 58% of the steel, and 40% of the coal. War contracts made some firms prosperous but on the whole did not compensate for the loss of foreign markets. There was a permanent loss of population caused by battle deaths and emigration.

The economy of Algeria was severely disrupted. Internal lines of communication and transportation were disrupted, and shipments of the main export, cheap wine, had to be cut back. Crime soared as French forces were transferred to the Western Front, and there was rioting in Batna Province. Shortages mounted, inflation soared, banks cut off credit, and the provincial government was ineffective.

==== Finance ====
The French government floated four war bond issues on the London market and raised 55 million pounds. These bonds were denominated in francs instead of pounds or gold, and were not guaranteed against exchange rate fluctuations. After the war the franc lost value and British bondholders tried, and failed, to get restitution.

J.P. Morgan & Co. of New York was the major American financier for the Allies, and worked closely with French bankers. However its dealings became strained because of growing misunderstandings between the Wall Street bankers and French bankers and diplomats.

==== French colonies ====
French colonies supplied workers for munitions factories and other jobs in France. A famous example was Ho Chi Minh who worked in Paris, and was highly active in organizing fellow Vietnamese, and even demanding a voice for them at the Paris Peace Conference in 1919. The French army enlisted hundreds of thousands of colonials. From Africa came 212,000 soldiers, of whom 160,000 fought on the Western front.

The rapid unplanned buildup of French military operations in Africa, disrupted normal trade relations and all the colonies, especially disrupting food supplies for the cities and distorting the local labor markets. French administrators, focused on supporting the armies on the Western Front, disregarded or suppressed protest movements.

=== Russia ===
The Russian economy was far too backward to sustain a major war, and conditions deteriorated rapidly, despite financial aid from Britain. By late 1915 there was a severe shortage of artillery shells. The very large but poorly equipped Imperial Russian Army fought tenaciously and desperately despite its poor organisation and lack of munitions. Casualties were enormous. By 1915, many soldiers were sent to the front unarmed, and told to pick up whatever weapons they could from the battlefield.

The onset of World War I exposed the poor administrative skills of the tsarist government under Nicholas II. A show of national unity had accompanied Russia's entrance into the war, with defense of the Slavic Serbs the main battle cry. In the summer of 1914, the Duma and the zemstva expressed full support for the government's war effort. The initial conscription was well organized and peaceful, and the early phase of Russia's military buildup showed that the empire had learned lessons from the Russo-Japanese War. But military reversals and the government's incompetence soon soured much of the population. Enemy control of the Baltic Sea and the Black Sea severed Russia from most of its foreign supplies and markets.

Russia had not prepared for a major war and reacted very slowly as problems mounted in 1914–16. Inflation became a serious problem. Because of inadequate material support for military operations, the War Industry Committees were formed to ensure that necessary supplies reached the front. But army officers quarreled with civilian leaders, seized administrative control of front areas, and refused to cooperate with the committee. The central government distrusted the independent war support activities that were organized by zemstva and cities. The Duma quarreled with the war bureaucracy of the government, and center and center-left deputies eventually formed the Progressive Bloc to create a genuinely constitutional government. While the central government was hampered by court intrigue, the strain of the war began to cause popular unrest. Food shortages increasingly impacted urban areas, caused by military purchases, transportation bottlenecks, financial confusion, and administrative mismanagement. By 1915 high food prices and fuel shortages caused strikes in some cities. Food riots became more common and more violent, and ready the angry populace for withering political attacks on the czarist regime. Workers, who had won the right to representation in sections of the War Industries Committee, used those sections to mobilize political opposition. The countryside also was becoming restive. Soldiers were increasingly insubordinate, particularly the newly recruited peasants who faced the prospect of being used as cannon fodder in the inept conduct of the war.

The bad situation continued to deteriorate. Increasing conflict between the Tsar and the Duma destroyed popular and elite support for the old regime. In early 1917, deteriorating rail transport caused acute food and fuel shortages, which resulted in escalating riots and strikes. Authorities summoned troops to quell the disorders in Petrograd (as St. Petersburg had been called since September 1914, to Russianize the Germanic name). In 1905 troops had fired on demonstrators and saved the monarchy, but in 1917 the troops turned their guns over to the angry crowds. Public support for the tsarist regime simply evaporated in 1917, ending three centuries of Romanov rule.

=== Italy ===
Italy joined the Allies in 1915, but was poorly prepared for war. Loans from Britain paid for nearly all its war expenses. The Royal Italian Army of 875,000 men was poorly led and lacked heavy artillery and machine guns. The industrial base was too small to provide adequate amounts of modern equipment, and the old-fashioned rural base did not produce much of a food surplus.

Before the war the government had ignored labor issues, but now it had to intervene to mobilize war production. With the main working-class Socialist Party reluctant to support the war effort, strikes were frequent and cooperation was minimal, especially in the Socialist strongholds of Piedmont and Lombardy. The government imposed high wage scales, as well as collective bargaining and insurance schemes. Many large firms expanded dramatically. The workforce at the Ansaldo munitions company grew from 6,000 to 110,000 as it manufactured 10,900 artillery pieces, 3,800 warplanes, 95 warships and 10 million artillery shells. At Fiat the workforce grew from 4,000 to 40,000. Inflation doubled the cost of living. Industrial wages kept pace but not wages for farm workers. Discontent was high in rural areas since so many men were taken for service, industrial jobs were unavailable, wages grew slowly and inflation was just as bad.

=== United States ===
==== Economic crisis in 1917 ====
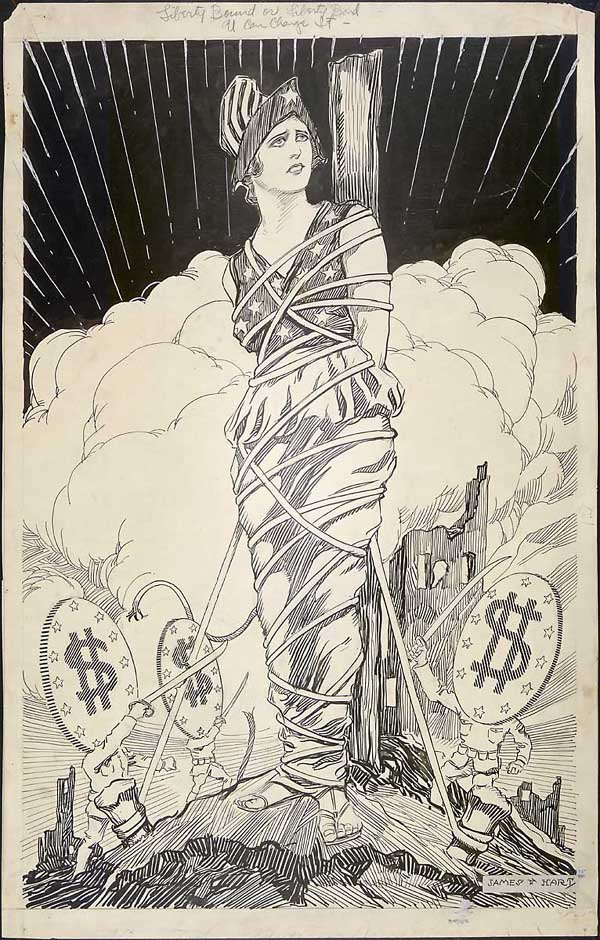
Poster to promote the sale of Liberty Bonds, c. 1917–18; contributed coins will cut the ropes binding Columbia to the stake.

In terms of munitions production, the 15 months after April 1917 involved an amazing parade of mistakes and confusion. Woodrow Wilson was unable to figure out what to do when, or even to decide who was in charge. Typical of the confusion was the coal shortage that hit in December 1917. Because coal was by far the most major source of energy and heat, a grave crisis ensued. There was in fact plenty of coal being mined, but 44,000 loaded freight and coal cars were tied up in horrendous traffic jams in the rail yards of the East Coast. Two hundred ships were waiting in New York harbor for cargo that was delayed by the mess. The solution included nationalizing the coal mines and the railroads for the duration, shutting down factories one day a week to save fuel, and enforcing a strict system of priorities. Only in March 1918 did Wilson finally take control of the crisis.

==== Women ====
The war saw many women gaining access to and taking on jobs traditionally assigned to men. Many worked on the assembly lines of factories, producing trucks and munitions. The morale of the women remained high, as millions join the Red Cross as volunteers to help soldiers and their families. With rare exceptions, the women did not protest the draft. For the first time, department stores employed African American women as elevator operators and cafeteria waitresses.

==== Labor ====
Samuel Gompers, head of the AFL, and nearly all labor unions were strong supporters of the war effort. They minimized strikes as wages soared and full employment was reached. The AFL unions strongly encouraged their young men to enlist in the military, and fiercely opposed efforts to reduce recruiting and slow war production by the anti-war labor union called the Industrial Workers of the World (IWW) and also left-wing Socialists. President Wilson appointed Gompers to the powerful Council of National Defense, where he set up the War Committee on Labor. The AFL membership soared to 2.4 million in 1917. In 1919, the Union tried to make their gains permanent and called a series of major strikes in meat, steel and other industries. The strikes, all of which failed, forced unions back to the position they had held around 1910.

== Central Powers ==
=== Germany ===
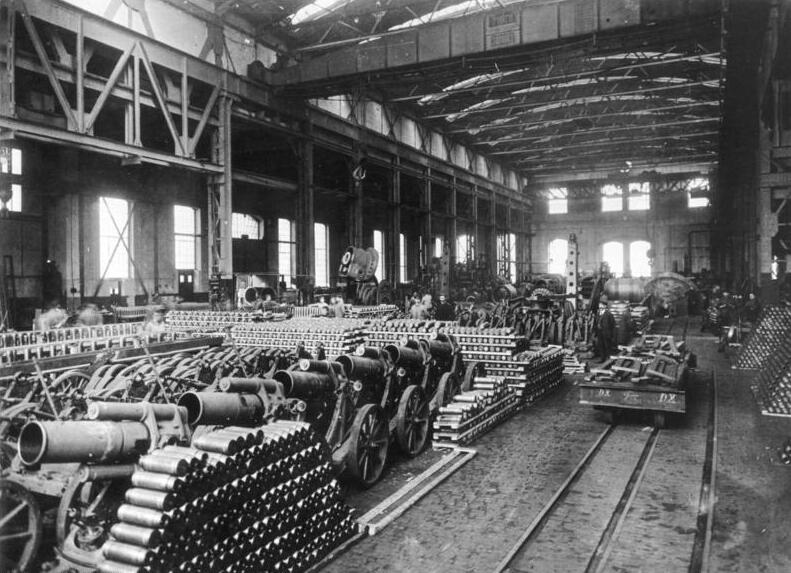
German munitions factory, 1916

While Germany rapidly mobilized its soldiers, it had to improvise the mobilization of the civilian economy for the war effort. It was severely handicapped by the British blockade that cut off food supplies, machinery and raw materials.

Walther Rathenau played the key role in convincing the War Ministry to set up the War Raw Materials Department (Kriegsrohstoffabteilung—"KRA"); he was in charge of it from August 1914 to March 1915 and established the basic policies and procedures. His senior staff were on loan from industry. KRA focused on raw materials threatened by the British blockade, as well as supplies from occupied Belgium and France. It set prices and regulated the distribution to vital war industries. It began the development of ersatz raw materials. KRA suffered many inefficiencies caused by the complexity and selfishness KRA encountered from commerce, industry, and the government. Some two dozen additional agencies were created dealing with specific products; the agencies could confiscate supplies and redirect them to the munitions factories. Cartels were created and small firms merged into larger ones for greater efficiency and ease of central control.

Even though there is a belief that the inequality among the German population only increased during WW1, a number of studies have shown the opposite. It was proved that the income of the majority of the enterprises declined proportionally to the loss in the real wage. Moreover, the international corporate profits (e.g. in the UK) of that time were generally higher than those of Germany. The only companies that have undergone the rise in profits were related to the chemical, metal and machinery industries. Those were usually referred to as 'war profiteers'.

The military took an increasingly dominant role in setting economic priorities and in direct control of vital industries. It was usually inefficient, but it performed very well in aircraft. The Imperial German Army set prices and wages, gave out draft exemptions, guaranteed the supply of credit and raw materials, limited patent rights, and supervised management–labor relationships. The industry expanded very rapidly with high quality products and many innovations, and paid wages well above the norm for skilled workers.

Total spending by the national government reached 170 billion marks during the war, of which taxes covered only 8%, and the rest was borrowed from German banks and private citizens. Eight national war loans reached out to the entire population and raised 100 million marks. It proved almost impossible to borrow money from outside. The national debt rose from only 5 billion marks in 1914 to 156 billion in 1918. These bonds became worthless in 1923 because of hyperinflation.

As the war went on conditions deteriorated rapidly on the home front, with severe food shortages reported in all urban areas by 1915. Causes involved the transfer of many farmers and food workers into the military, an overburdened railroad system, shortages of coal, and the British blockade that cut off imports from abroad. The winter of 1916–1917 was known as the "turnip winter", because that vegetable, usually fed to livestock, was used by people as a substitute for potatoes and meat, which were increasingly scarce. Thousands of soup kitchens were opened to feed the hungry people, who grumbled that the farmers were keeping the food for themselves. Even the army had to cut the rations for soldiers. Morale of both civilians and soldiers continued to sink.

Historical evolution of GDP per capita (PPP) of the German Empire during the period 1871-1919

Source: Maddison Historical Statistics Project

=== Ottoman Empire ===
In the Ottoman Empire Turkish nationalists took control before the war began. They drove out Greeks and Armenians who had been the backbone of the business community, replacing them with ethnic Turks who were given favorable contracts but who lacked the international connections, credit sources, and entrepreneurial skills needed for business. The Ottoman economy was based on subsistence agriculture; there was very little industry. Turkish wheat was in high demand, but transportation was rudimentary and not much of it reached Germany. The war cut off imports except from Germany. Prices quadrupled. The Germans provided loans and supplied the army with hardware, especially captured Belgian and Russian equipment. Other supplies were short; the soldiers were often in rags. Medical services were very bad and illness and death rates were high. Most of the Ottoman soldiers deserted when they had the opportunity, so the force level shrank from a peak strength of 800,000 in 1916 to only 100,000 in 1918.

=== Austria-Hungary ===
The Austro-Hungarian monarchical personal union of the two countries was a result of the Compromise of 1867. The Kingdom of Hungary lost its former status after the Hungarian Revolution of 1848. However following the 1867 reforms, the Austrian and the Hungarian states became co-equal within the Empire. Austria-Hungary was geographically the second-largest country in Europe after the Russian Empire, at 621,538 km^{2} (239,977 sq mi), and the third-most populous (after Russia and the German Empire). In comparison with Germany and Britain, the Austro-Hungarian economy lagged behind considerably, as sustained modernization had begun much later in Austria-Hungary. The Empire built up the fourth-largest machine building industry of the world, after the United States, Germany, and Britain. Austria-Hungary was also the world's third largest manufacturer and exporter of electric home appliances, electric industrial appliances and facilities for power plants, after the United States and the German Empire.

The Empire of Austria and the Kingdom of Hungary had always maintained separate parliaments: the Imperial Council (Austria) and the Diet of Hungary. Except for the Pragmatic Sanction of 1713, common laws never existed in the Empire of Austria and the Kingdom of Hungary.

There was no common citizenship: one was either an Austrian citizen or a Hungarian citizen, never both. Austria and Hungary were fiscally sovereign and independent entities. The Kingdom of Hungary could preserve its separated and independent budget.

However, by the end of the 19th century, economic differences gradually began to even out as economic growth in the eastern parts of the Empire consistently surpassed that in the western. The strong agriculture and food industry of the Kingdom of Hungary with the centre of Budapest became predominant within the empire and made up a large proportion of the export to the rest of Europe. Meanwhile, western areas, concentrated mainly around Prague and Vienna, excelled in various manufacturing industries. This division of labour between the east and west, besides the existing economic and monetary union, led to an even more rapid economic growth throughout Austria-Hungary by the early 20th century. Austria could preserve its dominance within the empire in the sectors of the Industrial Revolution, but Hungary had a better position in the industries of the Second Industrial Revolution, in these modern industrial sectors the Austrian competition could not become overwhelming.

The empire's heavy industry had mostly focused on machine building, especially for the electric power industry, locomotive industry and automotive industry, while in light industry the precision mechanics industry was the most dominant.

During the war the national governments of Vienna and Budapest set up a highly centralized war economy, resulting in a bureaucratic dictatorship. It drafted skilled workers and engineers without realizing the damage it did to the economy.

The Czech region had a more advanced economy, but was reluctant to support the war effort. Czechs rejected any customs union with Germany, because it threatened their language and culture. Czech bankers had an eye to early independence; they purchased many securities from the Czech lands, thus insuring their strong domestic position in what became Czechoslovakia in 1918.

=== Bulgaria ===
Bulgaria, a poor rural nation of 4.5 million people, at first stayed neutral. In 1915 it joined the Central Powers. It mobilized a very large army of 800,000 men, using equipment supplied by Germany. Bulgaria was ill-prepared for a long war; absence of so many soldiers sharply reduced agricultural output. Much of its best food was smuggled out to feed lucrative black markets elsewhere. By 1918 the soldiers were not only short of basic equipment like boots but they were being fed mostly corn bread with a little meat. The peace treaty in 1919 stripped Bulgaria of its conquests, reduced its army to 20,000 men, and demanded reparations of £100 million.

== Neutral countries ==
=== Chile ===
Chile's international trade collapsed and state income was reduced to half of its previous value after the start of the World War I in 1914. The Haber process, first applied on an industrial scale in 1913 and later used as part of Germany's war effort due to its lack of access to Chilean saltpetre, ended Chile's monopoly on nitrate and led to an economic decline in Chile. In addition to this the opening of Panama Canal in 1914 caused a severe drop in traffic along Chilean ports due to shifts in the maritime trade routes.

== Postwar ==
Conditions on the Continent were bad for every belligerent. Britain sustained the lightest damage to its civilian economy, apart from its loss of men. The major damage was to its merchant marine and to its financial holdings. The United States and Canada prospered during the war. The reparations levied on Germany by the Treaty of Versailles were, in theory, supposed to restore the damage to the civilian economies, but little of the reparations money went for that. Most of Germany's reparations payments were funded by loans from American banks, and the recipients used them to pay off loans they had from the U.S. Treasury. Between 1919 and 1932, Germany paid out 19 billion goldmarks in reparations, and received 27 billion goldmarks in loans from New York bankers and others. These loans were eventually paid back by Germany after World War II.

== See also ==
- Diplomatic history of World War I
- Economic warfare
- Home front during World War I
