= Australian Honour Flag =

Australian flag

The Australian Honour Flag is a special Australian flag that was created by the Commonwealth Government in 1918, as a result of World War I. It consists of a white flag, with the national flag in canton, a large 7-pointed star, and three blue vertical bars, with a red border overall.

Towns and districts in Australia which subscribed twice their quota of funds to the Commonwealth Government's Seventh War Loan in 1918 were presented with the Honour Flag. Individual contributors were awarded a certificate known as a House Badge, which featured an illustration of the Honour Flag without the bars and star.

== See also ==
- List of Australian flags
