= Rock rattlesnake =

Rock rattlesnake may refer to:

- Crotalus lepidus, rock rattlesnake, or eastern rock rattlesnake, or Texas rock rattlesnake, and associated subspecies
  - Crotalus lepidus klauberi, banded rock rattlesnake
  - Crotalus lepidus lepidus, mottled rock rattlesnake
  - Crotalus lepidus maculosus, Durango rock rattlesnake
- Crotalus morulus, Tamaulipan rock rattlesnake

== See also ==
- Crotalus horridus, timber rattlesnake
