= Ten Deadliest Snakes with Nigel Marven =

US TV wildlife documentary series

- Genre: Nature documentary
- Directed by: Alex Minton; Nigel Marven
- Presented by: Nigel Marven
- Composer: Will Slater
- Country of origin: United Kingdom
- Original language: English

Production
- Producer: Nigel Marven
- Cinematography: Michael Hutchinson; Chin Hor Wong; Nathan Ridler; Tom Ross; Malcolm Ludgate
- Editors: Robin Lewis; Rob Davies; Tom Wright
- Running time: 44 minutes
- Production company: Image Impact Ltd

Original release
- Network: Eden; Animal Planet; Nat Geo Wild

Ten Deadliest Snakes with Nigel Marven is a twelve-part wildlife documentary series from 2013 to 2017. It began airing on Eden Channel in 2013. Seasons 1 and 2 were also broadcast on Animal Planet Europe, while season 3 was premiered on Nat Geo Wild UK and later screened on Nat Geo Wild Europe & Africa in 2017. It is presented by Nigel Marven, who travels around the world and in each hour-long episode he counts down his list of ten deadliest snakes in each different country or continent. The series is produced by Image Impact.

== Episodes ==
Between 2013 and 2017, 3 seasons were produced, each containing 4 episodes, making up 12 episodes in total.

=== Costa Rica ===
Animals featured:

- 10. yellow-bellied sea snake
- 9. jumping pit viper
- 8. side-striped palm pit viper
- 7. hognose pit viper
- 6. eyelash pit viper
- 5. Central American coral snake
- 4. Neotropical rattlesnake
- 3. Picado's pit viper
- 2. terciopelo
- 1. black-headed bushmaster

The programme also includes the Collared aracari, Black-cheeked woodpecker, White-necked jacobin, Crowned woodnymph, Green-breasted mango, Snowcap, Northern caiman lizard, Plumed basilisk, Tent-making bat, bird snake, Granular poison frog, Smooth helmeted iguana, Leafcutter ant, milk snake, American crocodile

=== United States ===
Animals featured:

- 10. rock rattlesnake
- 9. sidewinder
- 8. copperhead
- 7. timber rattlesnake
- 6. tiger rattlesnake
- 5. cottonmouth
- 4. Eastern coral snake
- 3. Eastern diamondback rattlesnake
- 2. Western diamondback rattlesnake
- 1. Mojave rattlesnake

The programme also includes the Sonoran mountain kingsnake, Eastern racer, Ring-necked snake, Northern short-tailed shrew, Northern slimy salamander, Texas horned lizard, Florida banded water snake, Scarlet kingsnake, Gopher tortoise, Arizona black rattlesnake, Gila monster, Western hognose snake, Arizona blond tarantula.

=== South Africa ===
Animals featured:

- 10. Cape coral snake
- 9. boomslang
- 8. rinkhals
- 7. Eastern green mamba
- 6. Gaboon viper
- 5. forest cobra
- 4. Mozambique spitting cobra
- 3. puff adder
- 2. Cape cobra
- 1. black mamba

The programme also includes the Angonoka tortoise, Cape sugarbird, Mole snake, Southern right whale, Raucous toad, Cape weaver, Meerkat, Sociable weaver, Cape Vulture.

=== China ===
Animals featured:

- 10. short-tailed mamushi
- 9. white-lipped pit viper
- 8. black-banded sea krait
- 7. Taiwanese habu
- 6. Russell's viper
- 5. Chinese cobra and monocled cobra
- 4. many-banded krait
- 3. sharp-nosed viper
- 2. Mangshan pit viper
- 1. king cobra

The programme also includes the king ratsnake, Elaphe taeniura, Mandarin rat snake, tiger keelback, Cantor's rat snake, Formosan rock macaque, Swinhoe's Pheasant, ophisaurus hainanensis, and coconut crab.

=== Malaysia ===
Animals featured:

- 10. temple pit viper
- 9. reticulated python
- 8. red-headed krait
- 7. Siamese peninsula pit viper
- 6. mountain pit viper
- 5. beaked sea snake
- 4. Malayan pit viper
- 3. mangrove pit viper
- 2. King cobra
- 1. Sumatran spitting cobra and monocled cobra

The programme also includes the Elephant trunk snake, Great hornbill, Heteropoda davidbowie, Asian water monitor

=== Australia ===
Animals featured:

- 10. Red-bellied black snake
- 9. Inland taipan
- 8. Common death adder
- 7. Broad-headed snake
- 6. Australian copperhead
- 5. Tiger snake
- 4. Rough-scaled snake
- 3. Mulga snake
- 2. Coastal taipan
- 1. Eastern brown snake

Other Animals Tasmanian Devil, Saltwater crocodile, freshwater snake, Lesueur's velvet gecko, Southern cassowary, Frilled lizard, Tawny frogmouth, Yellow-footed rock-wallaby, Koala, Fox possum, Lemuroid possum, White-bellied sea eagle

=== India ===
Animals featured:

- 10. Laticauda colubrina
- 9. Trimeresurus andersonii
- 8. Trimeresurus gramineus
- 7. Trimeresurus malabaricus
- 6. Hypnale hypnale
- 5. Ophiophagus hannah
- 4. Naja naja
- 3. Echis carinatus
- 2. Bungarus caeruleus
- 1. Daboia russeli

The programme also includes the Amblypygi, Python molurus, Cyrtodactylus deccanensis, Rat snake, short-crested bay island forest lizard, Andaman bronzeback snake

=== Europe ===
Animals featured:

- 10. Telescopus fallax
- 9. Malpolon monspessulanus
- 8. Vipera ursinii
- 7. Vipera seoanei
- 6. Vipera latastei
- 5. Vipera berus
- 4. Vipera aspis
- 3. Macrovipera schweizeri
- 2. Vipera ammodytes
- 1. Montivipera xanthina

The programme also includes the Timon lepidus, Elaphe quatuorlineata, Blanus cinereus, Alytes, Ciconia ciconia, Sheltopusik, Green whip snake, Zamenis longissimus, Common midwife toad

=== Philippines ===
Animals featured:

- 10. Mangrove Snake
- 9. Reticulated Python
- 8. Palawan Pit Viper
- 7. Yellow-lipped sea krait
- 6. Mindanao Pit Viper
- 5. King Cobra
- 4. Philippine Coral Snake
- 3. Philippine Pit Viper
- 2. Samar cobra
- 1. Philippine cobra

Other animals:Great Philippine eagle , Hawksbill sea turtle , Tokay gecko , Sea lily

=== Brazil ===
Animals featured:

- 10. Painted Coral Snake
- 9. Golden Lancehead
- 8. Urutu
- 7. Bothrops pubescens
- 6. South American coral snake
- 5. Amazonian Palm Viper
- 4. Bothrops atrox
- 3. Cascabel
- 2. Jararacussu
- 1. Jararaca

Other animals:Capybara , Green anaconda , Southern screamer

=== Mexico ===
Animals featured:

- 10. Tamaulipan Rock Rattlesnake
- 9. Mexican Dusky Rattlesnake
- 8. Texas Coral Snake
- 7. Santa Catalina Rattlesnake
- 6. Mitchell's Rattlesnake
- 5. Baja California Rattlesnake
- 4. Red Diamondback Rattlesnake
- 3. Taylor's Cantil
- 2. Western Diamondback Rattlesnake
- 1. Terciopelo

Other animals :Grey whale, Mexican milk snake, Mexican mole lizard, Kemp's Ridley sea turtle, American whip snake, Central American spiny-tailed iguana

=== Arabia ===
Animals featured:

- 10. Arabian cat snake
- 9. Arabian False Cobra
- 8. Persian Horned Viper
- 7. Puff adder
- 6. Arabian Cobra
- 5. Desert Blacksnake
- 4. Persian Gulf Sea Snake
- 3. Arabian Horned Viper
- 2. Sind Saw-scaled Viper
- 1. Oman Carpet Viper
