= Nigel Marven =

British television presenter (born 1960)

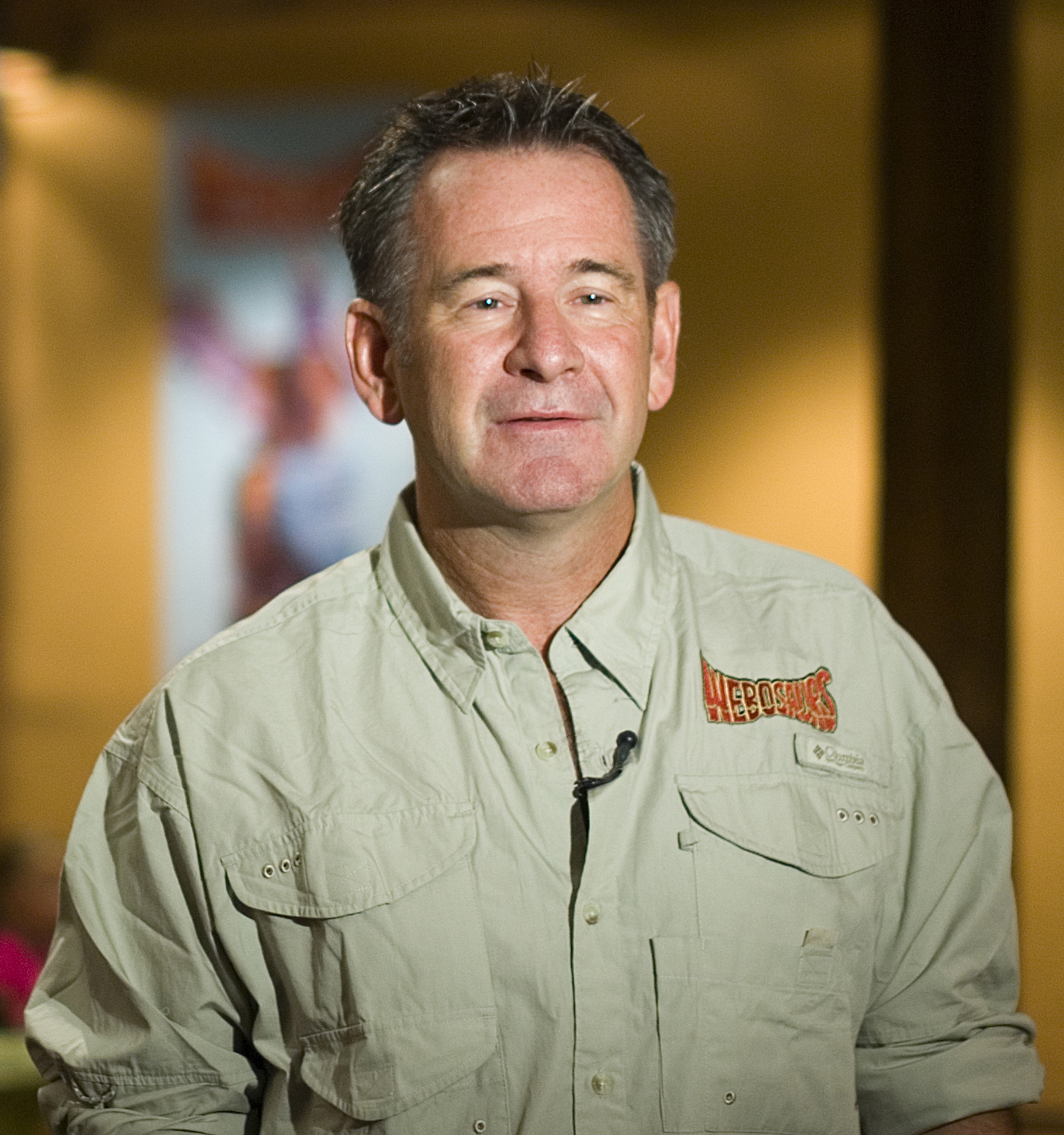
- Marven at the Webosaurs official launch in Dallas, 2009
- Born: 27 November 1960 (age 65); Barnet, England, United Kingdom
- Occupations: Television presenter for nature programmes; naturalist
- Years active: 1982–present
- Spouse(s): Jenny Hull (m. 1996; div. 2000) Gillian Impey (m. 2004; div. 2018)
- Children: 2
- Website: Nigel Marven

Nigel Alan Marven (born 27 November 1960) is a British wildlife TV presenter, naturalist, conservationist, author, and television producer. He is best known as presenter of the BBC miniseries Chased by Dinosaurs, its sequel, Sea Monsters, as well as the ITV miniseries Prehistoric Park. He is also known for his unorthodox, spontaneous, and daring style of presenting wildlife documentaries as well as for including factual knowledge in the proceedings.

== Career ==
=== Early life ===
Marven was born in Barnet but grew up in St. Albans. As a child he loved animals. His first pet was a hamster called Hummy. He kept stick insects, boa constrictors, and even an eel in a bath. When he was 15, he also owned young spectacled caiman. He studied botany and zoology at the University of Bristol until the age of 22, when he left to begin his career at the BBC Natural History Unit in Bristol.

=== Becoming producer and TV presenter (1982–1999) ===
From 1982 to the mid-1990s, Marven worked as a wildlife documentary researcher for such programmes as The First Eden and My Family and Other Animals. He then went on to begin producing nature documentary series, one of the first being Realms of the Russian Bear in 1992. He enjoyed a 12-year professional collaboration with the natural historian David Attenborough, whom he holds in high esteem. In 1998, he moved to ITV, where he was asked to present wildlife documentaries as well as produce them.

In his first television series for ITV, Giants, he swam with a great white shark without the protection of a cage. Other scenes included a goliath birdeater spider walking over his face, and Marven grappling a 15-foot (4.6 m) African rock python deep in its underground home. This style of presenting has allowed to be present in more than 50 wildlife programs and series for television.

=== Shark Week and prehistory programmes (2000–2009) ===
In 2000, Marven became the host of the hit annual Discovery Channel event Shark Week, and held this role for three years. In 2002, the Impossible Pictures production company asked Marven to present the Walking with Dinosaurs Special episodes "The Giant Claw" and "Land of Giants", which premiered on BBC One to nearly 7 million viewers in late 2002. In 2003, Marven also hosted a miniseries, Sea Monsters – A Walking with Dinosaurs Trilogy, which was an even bigger success. He then continued his partnership with Impossible Pictures as the studio moved on to ITV, beginning with Prehistoric Park in 2006, a fictional series about travelling back in time to rescue examples of extinct creatures such as Tyrannosaurus, the woolly mammoth, Arthropleura, and others. In his final appearance for Impossible Pictures, Marven was featured as himself in season 3, episode 4 of the ITV action drama series Primeval, which aired in 2009. He is seen playing with a baby Velociraptor, before encountering a Giganotosaurus, which, it is implied, eats him off-screen.

In addition to being presenter for Impossible Pictures's time-travelling programmes, Nigel Marven also founded his own independent company Image Impact in 2003, and started producing his own wildlife films, including a few one-hour specials and then miniseries, such as Penguin Safari and Panda Adventure, both which aired on Channel 5 and Animal Planet. In 2007, he also worked with Tigress Productions which resulted in his shows Shark Island and Jaguar Adventure.

=== Ten Deadliest Snakes and other nature programmes (2010–2020) ===
In the first half of the 2010s, Nigel produced nature documentaries such as Untamed China, Wild Colombia, Whale Adventure and Nigel Marven's Cruise Ship Adventures, the latter which was broadcast in May and June 2015 on Watch.

During the summer of 2014, Eden Channel in the UK started a new competition for aspiring wildlife filmmakers called Eden Shorts. The task was to make one-minute videos with animals, with the best ones to be shown on TV. Nigel Marven, along with Michaela Strachan, were judges. Nigel has also made some short how-to-guides, available through Eden Channel's website. In May 2015, Eden premiered a film called Eden Shorts: From Lens to Screen presented by Marven. In the show, he meets competition finalists and reveals techniques used to shoot their videos.

One of his more recent successes, Ten Deadliest Snakes, was first broadcast on Animal Planet in the United States in spring 2014, and on Eden in the UK in June of the same year. Season 2 of Ten Deadliest Snakes premiered in autumn 2015 on Eden, while season 3 began airing on 5 January 2017 on Nat Geo Wild in the United Kingdom. Highlights of Ten Deadliest Snakes included, among others, visiting sea krait caves in South China Sea, handling black mamba in South Africa, snake-hunting with Steve Irwin's son Robert in the billabongs of Australia Zoo and visiting the Brazilian island of Queimada Grande, home of the golden lancehead, with a scientific expedition.

In January 2018, Nigel's Untamed Philippines was screened on Nat Geo Wild in the United States. The presenter-led version of this documentary called Wild Philippines with Nigel Marven aired on Viasat Nature in Europe in March and April 2018 and on Animal Planet India in June 2018, with the American TV channel PBS airing the series in late summer 2019.

As of November 2022, Nigel Marven's newest nature series is Wild Central America, a documentary miniseries consisting of four episodes, each looking at wildlife of a different Central American country, with focus on Honduras, Costa Rica, Guatemala and Panama. While Wild Honduras premiered on Viasat Nature in central and eastern Europe in summer 2019, the rest of the series was first broadcast on the same channel in late spring and summer 2020. The presenter-less version of Wild Costa Rica and Wild Guatemala premiered on Nat Geo Wild in February 2020.

=== Return to prehistoric media and other wildlife documentaries (2020–present) ===
In September 2020, Blue Meridian and Crytivo released the official trailer for the video game Prehistoric Kingdom, featuring Marven as narrator. On 30 September, the day after the trailer's release, the creative team behind the game confirmed in a live stream that they had approached Marven to narrate the trailer after they saw that he followed the game's official page on Twitter. In May 2021, he confirmed on his Twitter account that he was recording voice-over for the game. Marven also voiced the Early Access Trailer for the game, which was released on 21 April 2022. The game, featuring Marven's voiceover commentary, was released on 27 April 2022.

In July 2021, Minecraft Bedrock addon creator CompyCraft released a trailer for a Minecraft dinosaur expansion pack, which featured Marven's voiceover. The project was named The Giant Dinosaur Adventure, and was confirmed to be featuring Marven's character inside the game itself. The Giant Dinosaur Adventure later released on 27 September 2022 on the in-game Minecraft Bedrock store.

Marven narrated the upcoming independent documentary project Forgotten Bloodlines: Agate, which will take 20 million years ago during the Neogene period. It was originally slated for release in 2022 but was later pushed to a yet-to-be-announced date.

In 2022, Marven partnered with MagellanTV to produce a one-hour documentary titled Wild El Salvador — In the Shadow of the Volcanoes with Nigel Marven. The film was released on 2 March 2023 as part of MagellanTV's celebration of World Wildlife Day.

Marven's most recent project is a one-hour documentary film titled Wild Slovakia with Nigel Marven, set to premiere on 1 January 2024 on the Slovak RSTV channel Dvojka. It was filmed throughout 2022 and 2023 by a British-Slovak film-making team. In 2025 and 2026, the film was internationally shown on Viasat Nature. The sequel, titled Wild Slovakia with Nigel Marven 2, was released on 2 January 2026 on the Slovak TV channel TV JOJ. He also produced a two-part series titled Wild Arabia which premiered in autumn 2024 on Nat Geo Wild. In December 2025, Marven's new documentary titled Penultimate Penguin with Nigel Marven came out on MagellanTV.

=== Close encounters ===
Marven was bitten by a venomous green pit viper in the East Malaysian state of Sabah in the summer of 2014 during filming of the first episode of the show Eating Wild. The snake bit him on the thumb but did not inject much venom, so Marven spent only six hours in the hospital until he had recovered. He has also had a few other very dangerous encounters with venomous snakes. While he was producing the BBC film The Serpent's Embrace in the 1980s, a spitting cobra sprayed its venom into his eyes. He spent two to three days in hospital, though luckily the venom did not enter his blood.

A similar encounter happened in December 2008 while Marven was making a short film about black-necked spitting cobras for Webosaurs. Though he wore a mask, the cobra venom landed in his hair, then mixed with sweat and ran into his eyes, so he stopped the filming until next morning. In his 2008 series Jaguar Adventure he was bitten by a mildly toxic venomous false water cobra. His hand swelled up within ten minutes, but there were no other harmful effects.

In his 2004 nature documentary Bull Shark: World's Deadliest Shark, Marven was in the Bahamas and stood with shark expert Erich Ritter in the water surrounded by sharks. During the filming, a bull shark attacked Ritter's leg and gave him a 30-centimetre (12 in) bite to his calf. Marven still recalls it as one of the most dangerous moments in his career.

In 2005, while filming the Indian rhinoceros in Kaziranga National Park, Marven and his crew unknowingly got too close to a female rhinoceros with a small calf; the mother rhinoceros charged them, but since they were riding in a truck, they were able to outdistance her. Marven later said that this experience was the most exciting moment in his entire film-making career.

In the third episode of his 2012 series Wild Colombia, Marven was bitten on his nose by a non-venomous Central American tree boa, causing blood to cover his face. A similar encounter happened in his 2013 show Ten Deadliest Snakes: China with a king ratsnake. Likewise, in Ten Deadliest Snakes: Brazil from 2017, he got bitten on the nose by a non-venomous green vine snake.

=== Conservation ===
Marven ran the 2008 London Marathon in 4 hours and 4 minutes to try to raise £20,000 for the Whale and Dolphin Conservation Society UK.

He is a Panda Ambassador for Chengdu Panda Base in Sichuan Province, China. He is also a patron of The Great Fen Project for restoring vital wildlife habitat, Healthy Planet through which he adopted a plot of land for helping to create new wildlife habitats, and Vale Wildlife Hospital, which treats injured wildlife in Gloucestershire, England. He is also a patron of the ORCA organization, which protects whales and dolphins in European waters.

Many of his TV wildlife programmes also seek to highlight the conservation of nature and endangered species. For example, his series Panda Adventure provides a look at the giant panda breeding programs at the Chengdu Panda Base and at the San Diego Zoo in San Diego, California, in the United States. In the third episode of Season 3 of Ten Deadliest Snakes, he covered the Kemp's ridley sea turtle conservation project in Tamaulipas, Mexico.

In 2016, Marven produced and narrated a short film featuring the work of the Black Mamba Anti-Poaching Unit, which is fighting against rhinoceros poaching in South Africa. The film is available to watch via the Internet and is presented by animal campaigner Anneka Svenska.

=== Awards and honours ===
Marven was nominated for a BAFTA TV Award in 2000 for Best Features for his first presenter-led series, Giants.

In 2015, he was nominated for the Donald Gosling Award by Maritime Media Awards for his series Nigel Marven's Cruise Ship Adventures.

In 2016, he received an award from the Cruise Lines International Association.

In 2022, a species of Cretaceous spathiopterygid wasp described by Maxime Santer and his colleagues was named Diameneura marveni in honor of Marven "for his appearances in several palaeontology documentaries". In 2024, an Oligocene-aged fossil thylacine relative, Ngamalacinus nigelmarveni, was named after Marven "for his lifetime dedication to inspiring young paleontologists through his unique and daring style of presenting documentaries on ancient life."

== Personal life ==
Marven married Jenny Hull in September 1996, but they separated four years later. Marven fathered Jane Braham's son Theo, but went on to marry Gillian Impey on 1 May 2004. They also have a child. During the filming of The Wright Stuff on 14 July 2017 Marven announced that he was going through his second divorce. His children are one son Theo and daughter Eleonora.

During a simulated dinosaur encounter in the third episode of Prehistoric Park, Marven states that, like Incisivosaurus, he is a vegetarian. Throughout the series he applies the same term to naturally herbivorous animals. In the second episode of the Untamed China series, he says the team cooked vegetarian food especially for him. Marven confirms he is a vegetarian on his official website by stating that the peregrine falcon is his favourite animal and that he would love to be such a bird. However, because he is a vegetarian, eating raw pigeon would make that hard. In Panda Adventure, Marven states that he is "usually teetotal" when having a celebratory drink with a team of Chinese trackers who led him to see giant pandas close-up in the wild.

When asked on social media by a fan which religion does he practice, Nigel Marven answered that he doesn't practice any, and that he's a Darwinist.

== Filmography ==
- Realms of the Russian Bear (1992)
- Incredible Journeys (1997)
- Wildlife of Iran: Secrets of the North (1998)
- Giants (1999)
- Shark Week (2000–02)
- Bloodsuckers (2000)
- Giant Creepy Crawlies (2001)
- Big Cats (2001)
- Nigel's Wild Wild World (2001–02)
- Rats (2002)
- Alligators (2002)
- Chased by Dinosaurs (2002)
  - A Walking with Dinosaurs' Special: The Giant Claw (2002)
  - A Walking with Dinosaurs' Special: Land of Giants (2002)
- Sea Monsters: A Walking with Dinosaurs Trilogy or Chased by Sea Monsters (2003)
- Nigel Marven Nature Specials (2003–04)
  - Anacondas (2003)
  - Piranhas (2003)
  - Bull Sharks (2004)
- Meerkats (2003)
- The Human Senses (2003)
- King of the Jungle (2003)
- Extreme Animal Attacks (2003)
- Scream! If You Want to Get Off (2004)
- Nigel Marven's Animal Detectives (2005)
- Nigel Marven's Venom Hunters (2005)
- Britain's Finest: Natural Wonders (2005)
- Rhinos (2006)
- Ugly Animals (2006)
- Prehistoric Park (2006)
- Penguin Week with Nigel Marven (2006)
- The Crocodile Hunter: A Tribute to Steve Irwin (2006)
- Micro Safari: Journey to the Bugs (2007)
- Killer Whale Islands (2007)
- Hider in the House (2007 - on Week 20)
- Arctic Exposure (2007) USA
- Polar Bear Week with Nigel Marven (2007)
- Shark Island with Nigel Marven (2007)
- Jaguar Adventure with Nigel Marven (2008)
- Help! I'm No Bigger Than a Bug (2008)
- Weird, True & Freaky Shark Attacks (2008)
- Primeval - Episode 3.4 (2009) UK
- Invasion of the Giant Pythons: Florida with Nigel Marven (2009) UK
- Panda Week with Nigel Marven (2010) UK
- Untamed China with Nigel Marven (2011) UK
- Yunnan Adventure with Nigel Marven (2012) (UKTV Eden)
- Hainan Adventure with Nigel Marven (2012) (UKTV Eden)
- Great Animal Escapes (2012)
- Wild Colombia with Nigel Marven (2012) UK
- Whale Adventure with Nigel Marven (2013) UK
- Ten Deadliest Snakes with Nigel Marven: China (2013)
- My Family & Other Turkeys with Nigel Marven (2013) UK
- Ten Deadliest Snakes with Nigel Marven (2014)
- Eating Wild (2014) (AFC)
- Nigel Marven's Cruise Ship Adventures (2015)
- Eden Shorts: From Lens to Screen (2015)
- Ten Deadliest Snakes with Nigel Marven: Series 2 (2015)
- Ten Deadliest Snakes with Nigel Marven: Series 3 (2016)
- Wild Philippines with Nigel Marven (2017)
- Wild Central America (2019-2020)
  - Wild Honduras (2019)
  - Wild Costa Rica (2020)
  - Wild Guatemala (2020)
  - Wild Panama (2020)
- University Challenge Christmas 2022 Episode 7 (2022)
- Wild El Salvador — In the Shadow of the Volcanoes with Nigel Marven (2023)
- Wild Slovakia with Nigel Marven (2024)
- My Best Friend's an Animal Episode 3: Spud, Digger and Tommy (2024)
- South Africa: A Wildlife Adventure (2024)
- Wild Arabia (2024)
- Land of the Arabian Leopard (2025)
- Penultimate Penguin with Nigel Marven (2025)
- Wild Slovakia 2 with Nigel Marven (2026)
- Wild Bangladesh (upcoming)
- Forgotten Bloodlines: Agate (upcoming — 2026)

== Video games ==
- Webosaurs (2009)
- Prehistoric Kingdom (2022)
- Minecraft: The Giant Dinosaur Adventure with Nigel Marven (2022)
- Minecraft: Claws – A Dinosaur Adventure with Nigel Marven (2024)

== Bibliography ==
- Identifying snakes: the new compact study guide and identifier - by Ken Preston-Mafham, Nigel Marven and Rob Harvey, Chartwell Books, 1996, ISBN 0-7858-0371-8
- Incredible Journeys - BBC Books, 1997, ISBN 0-563-38736-X
- Giants - Collins, 1999, ISBN 0-00-220157-7
- Around the World Making Wildlife Films - Oxford University Press, 2000, ISBN 0-19-833842-2
- Nigel Marven's Animal Vampires - Scholastic, 2000, ISBN 0-439-99947-2
- Nigel Marven's Giant Creepy Crawlies - Scholastic, 2000, ISBN 0-439-99948-0
- Sea Monsters by Nigel Marven and Jasper James - BBC Books, 2003, ISBN 0-563-48898-0, 167 pages, hardback
- Walking with Cavemen by John Lynch and Louise Barrett, with foreword written by Nigel Marven - DK Adult, ISBN 978-0-7894-9775-8, 224 pages, 2003, hardback
- Bugs, Beetles, Spiders Snakes Complete Identifier - by Ken Preston-Mafham, Nigel Marven and Rob Harvey, Brockhampton Press Inc., 2004, ISBN 1-84566-009-9
- Chased By Sea Monsters by Nigel Marven and Jasper James, DK ADULT, 2004, ISBN 978-0-7566-0375-5
- Dinosaurs - Kingfisher publications 2007, ISBN 978-0-7534-1474-3, 63 pages, hardback
- Prehistoric Park with Poster - adapted by Susan Evento, created by Jasper James, Meredith Books, 2007, ISBN 978-0-696-23691-4, 48 pages
- Field Guide to the Birds of Chile by Daniel E. Martínez Piña and Gonzalo E. González Cifuentes, with foreword written by Nigel Marven - Helm, 2021, ISBN 978-1-4729-7000-8, 224 pages, paperback
- Return to the Wild by Danelle Murray and Brendan Murray, with foreword written by Nigel Marven - Independently published, 2022, ISBN 978-1-928497-57-8, 248 pages, paperback
- Bird Photographer of the Year: Collection 10 by Bird Photographer of the Year Limited, with foreword written by Nigel Marven - Princeton University Press, 2025, ISBN 978-0-691-27867-4, 256 pages, hardcover.
