= Hainan Adventure with Nigel Marven =

- Genre: Travel documentary, Nature documentary
- Presented by: Nigel Marven
- Narrated by: Nigel Marven
- Composer: Will Slater
- Country of origin: United Kingdom
- Original language: English

Production
- Producer: Nigel Marven
- Production locations: Hainan Island, China
- Cinematography: Simon Wagen
- Editor: Rob Davies
- Running time: 44 minutes
- Production companies: Image Impact Ltd; Beijing Asian Union Culture; Media Investment Ltd

Original release
- Network: Eden
- Release: 10 February 2012

Related
- Yunnan Adventure with Nigel Marven; Untamed China with Nigel Marven

Hainan Adventure with Nigel Marven is one-hour British travel and nature documentary created by Image Impact production company for Eden and first broadcast in February 2012.

In the program, wildlife presenter Nigel Marven crosses Hainan Island in China in the footsteps of English explorer John Whitehead. Guided by Whitehead's journal, he journeys to South China Sea and Bawanling Reserve to explore pristine rainforests and meets a lot of different creatures, including Hainan silver pheasant. The highlight is encounter with one of the largest fruit bat roost in the world hidden under one roof.

== Links ==
- Fremantle Brand
