= List of David Attenborough's Natural Curiosities episodes =

The following is an episode list for the UKTV nature documentary David Attenborough's Natural Curiosities. The series is presented by Sir David Attenborough and was first broadcast in the United Kingdom on Eden on 29 January 2013.

== Series overview ==
Series	Episodes	Originally released		
Series	Episodes	First released	Last released	Network
1	5	29 January 2013	26 February 2013	Eden
2	10	18 February 2014	18 March 2014	W
3	6	2 February 2015	9 March 2015	W
4	6	11 June 2017	25 June 2017	W

== Episodes ==
=== Series 1 (2013) ===
No. overall	No. in series	Title	Original release date	UK viewers (millions)
1	1	"Stretched To The Limit"	29 January 2013	0.079
Some animals appear to have taken Nature’s gifts and stretched them to extreme limits. With these two natural curiosities one creature, the giraffe, has ended up with a super-stretched neck, the other, the chameleon, a super stretchy tongue. In both cases nature has found a way to turn the ordinary into the extraordinary.
2	2	"A Curious Hoax?"	5 February 2013	0.104
Attenborough discovers the curiosities that have led to accusations of forgery but have ultimately helped us rethink evolution. When early explorers brought the first specimen of a duck-billed platypus back to England in 1799, it was thought so bizarre it was deemed a hoax, while the midwife toad became the centre of a raging scientific storm in the 1920s that led to accusations of fakery.
3	3	"Young Wrinklies"	12 February 2013	0.029
Attenborough encounters two examples where Nature has tinkered with the aging process to alarmingly different effect – the first grows old while trapped in a young body while the second looks old from birth but might hold the key to a long life.
4	4	"A Curious Twist"	19 February 2013	0.118
The single spiral tusk of the narwhal inspiration for tales of unicorns and the myriad variations on the twist of the snail shell have delighted and fascinated naturalists and artists since the dawn of civilization.
5	5	"Seeing the Pattern"	26 February 2013	0.026
Zebra stripes vary subtly between the different species but there is one group of animals that has evolved colourful patterns of seemingly infinite variety, the butterflies. In this episode Attenborough looks at two examples of animal patterns that have bedazzled and baffled science for a long time, and uses modern tools to unlock their secrets.

=== Series 2 (2014) ===
No. overall	No. in series	Title	Original release date	UK viewers (millions)
6	1	"Virgin Births"	18 February 2014	TBA
Attenborough uses this episode to investigate two animals who are capable of true virgin birth - the production of offspring without the need for sex.
7	2	"Armoured Animals"	18 February 2014	TBA
This episode explores the story of two animals that hide behind seemingly impregnable coat of arms. Can Sir David Attenborough get in behind their armour and reveal their mysteries?
8	3	"Life In the Dark"	25 February 2014	TBA
Attenborough continues to shine the spotlight on nature's most amazing animals this time looking at the vision in squid and owls. Perhaps not a classic pairing, both owls and squid have incredible adaptations for being able to navigate at night.
9	4	"Curious Imposters"	25 February 2014	TBA
Here we discover that some animals are able to trick others into believing they are something that they are not. The art of deception is a powerful attribute for some.
10	5	"Bad Reputations"	8 March 2014	TBA
After initially gaining frightening reputations, it's now known that gorillas and bats are a lot gentler and considerate than their early reputations suggest.
11	6	"Shocking Senses"	8 March 2014	TBA
Plants and animals have some curious super senses that enable them to see, hear and feel things that are quite invisible to us.
12	7	"Life On Ice"	11 March 2014	TBA
In this episode we explore the remarkable adaptations of two creatures that have evolved to survive the most challenging of conditions and seem to defy the laws of nature.
13	8	"Spinners and Weavers"	11 March 2014	TBA
We'll find out how nature is incredibly inventive and has produced two unique mechanisms of natural construction that have fascinated scientists for centuries; weaving in birds and silk.
14	9	"Strange Parents"	18 March 2014	TBA
"Strange Parents" asks how we usually recognise animals as either male or female and how each sex normally plays a particular role in their own life cycle. However both hyenas and seahorses completely break the gender rules.
15	10	"Magical Appearances"	18 March 2014	TBA
"Magical Appearances" explores how swallows magically appear each spring and asks how did complex and beautiful insects like butterflies suddenly arrive in the summer. The discovery of the swallow's epic migration and the revelation that butterflies could metamorphose into totally different looking adults were scientific stories both cloaked in mystery and controversy.

=== Series 3 (2015) ===
No. overall	No. in series	Title	Original release date	UK viewers (millions)
16	1	"Impossible Feats"	2 February 2015	TBA
Attenborough examines creatures that have baffled us for centuries. This episode looks at how fleas jump and tracks the true speed of a cheetah.
17	2	"Curious Minds"	9 February 2015	TBA
Attenborough examines more creatures that have fascinated us for centuries. A look at the progress into IQ research concerning some highly intelligent, long-underestimated species.
18	3	"Expandable Bodies"	16 February 2015	TBA
Attenborough examines creatures that have fascinated us for centuries. This episode looks at the expandable bodies of anacondas and camels.
19	4	"Curious Feeders"	23 February 2015	TBA
Attenborough examines creatures that have fascinated us for centuries. A look at the unusual way of feeding of flamingos and the blue whale.
20	5	"Curious Cures"	2 March 2015	TBA
Attenborough examines more creatures that have fascinated us for centuries. A look at some species with remarkable healing properties.
21	6	"Remarkable Regeneration"	9 March 2015	TBA
Attenborough examines creatures that have fascinated us for centuries. A look at some species with remarkable regenerative powers.

=== Series 4 (2017) ===
No. overall	No. in series	Title	Original release date	UK viewers (millions)
22	1	"Animal Frankensteins"	11 June 2017	TBA
Attenborough looks at two hybrid species that owe their existence to human interference: the pizzly bear (a cross between a polar and grizzly bear) and the killer bee.
23	2	"Finding the Way"	11 June 2017	TBA
Attenborough looks at two species adept at finding their way: pigeons and dung beetles.
24	3	"Extreme Babies"	18 June 2017	TBA
Attenborough examines two species with unusual offspring: the giant panda, whose infants are the smallest of any mammal, and the kiwi, a bird that lays one of the biggest eggs.
25	4	"Curious Counters"	18 June 2017	TBA
Attenborough considers two species that appear to be able to count: a German horse called Hans and a variety of bamboo that flowers at exactly the same time anywhere it is in the world.
26	5	"Incredible Shells"	25 June 2017	TBA
Attenborough examines two types of hard shell that have evolved in nature: the shell of the tortoise and the shell of ostrich eggs.
27	6	"Ferocious Fighters"	25 June 2017	TBA
Attenborough looks at two species that are naturally aggressive fighters: the Siamese Fighting Fish and kangaroos.
