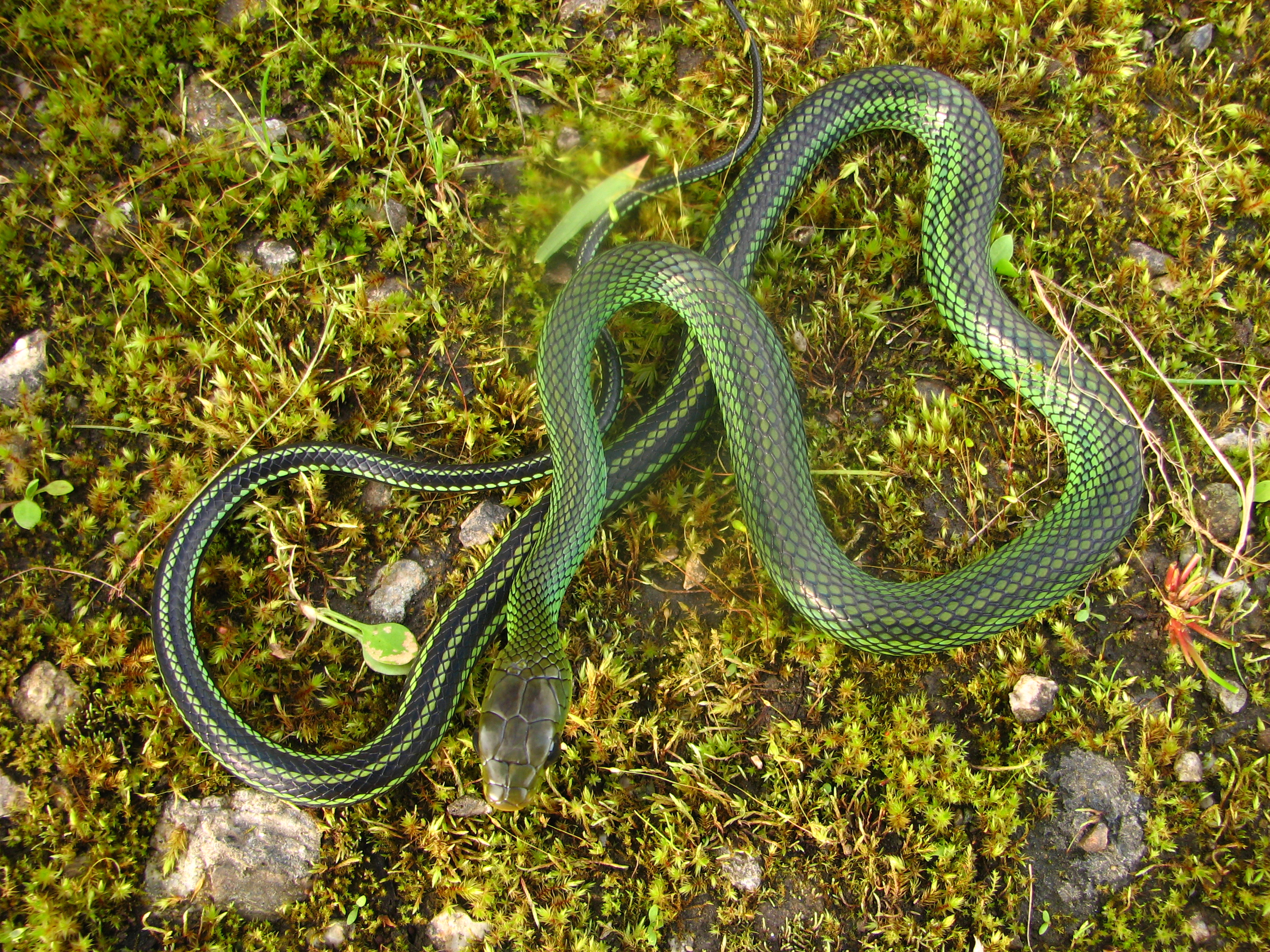
- Young green rat snake

Conservation status
- Least Concern (IUCN 3.1)

Scientific classification
- Kingdom: Animalia
- Phylum: Chordata
- Class: Reptilia
- Order: Squamata
- Suborder: Serpentes
- Family: Colubridae
- Genus: Ptyas
- Species: P. nigromarginata

Binomial name
- Ptyas nigromarginata (Blyth, 1854)

Synonyms
- Coluber nigromarginatus Blyth, 1854; Coryphodon carinatus Günther, 1858 (part); Zaocys nigromarginatus — Günther, 1864; Coryphodon dhumnades Jan, 1867 (non Cantor, 1842); Ptyas nigromarginata — David & Das, 2004; Ptyas nigromarginata — Whitaker & Captain, 2004

= Ptyas nigromarginata =

Species of snake

Ptyas nigromarginata, commonly known as the green rat snake or black-bordered rat snake, is a species of snake in the family Colubridae. The species is endemic to parts of Southeast Asia, including regions of China, India, Myanmar, and Vietnam. This slender, agile snake is characterized by its striking green coloration, often accompanied by a distinctive black border along its dorsal scales.

== Geographic range ==
P. nigromarginata is found in Bhutan, Nepal, India (Darjeeling, Sikkim, Assam, Arunachal Pradesh, Nagaland), northern Bangladesh, northern Myanmar (Burma), China (Guizhou, Yunnan, southwestern Sichuan, southeastern Xizang (Tibet]), and possibly northern Vietnam. The type locality is Darjeeling, India. It has been recorded from elevations between 500m to 2300m.

== Description ==
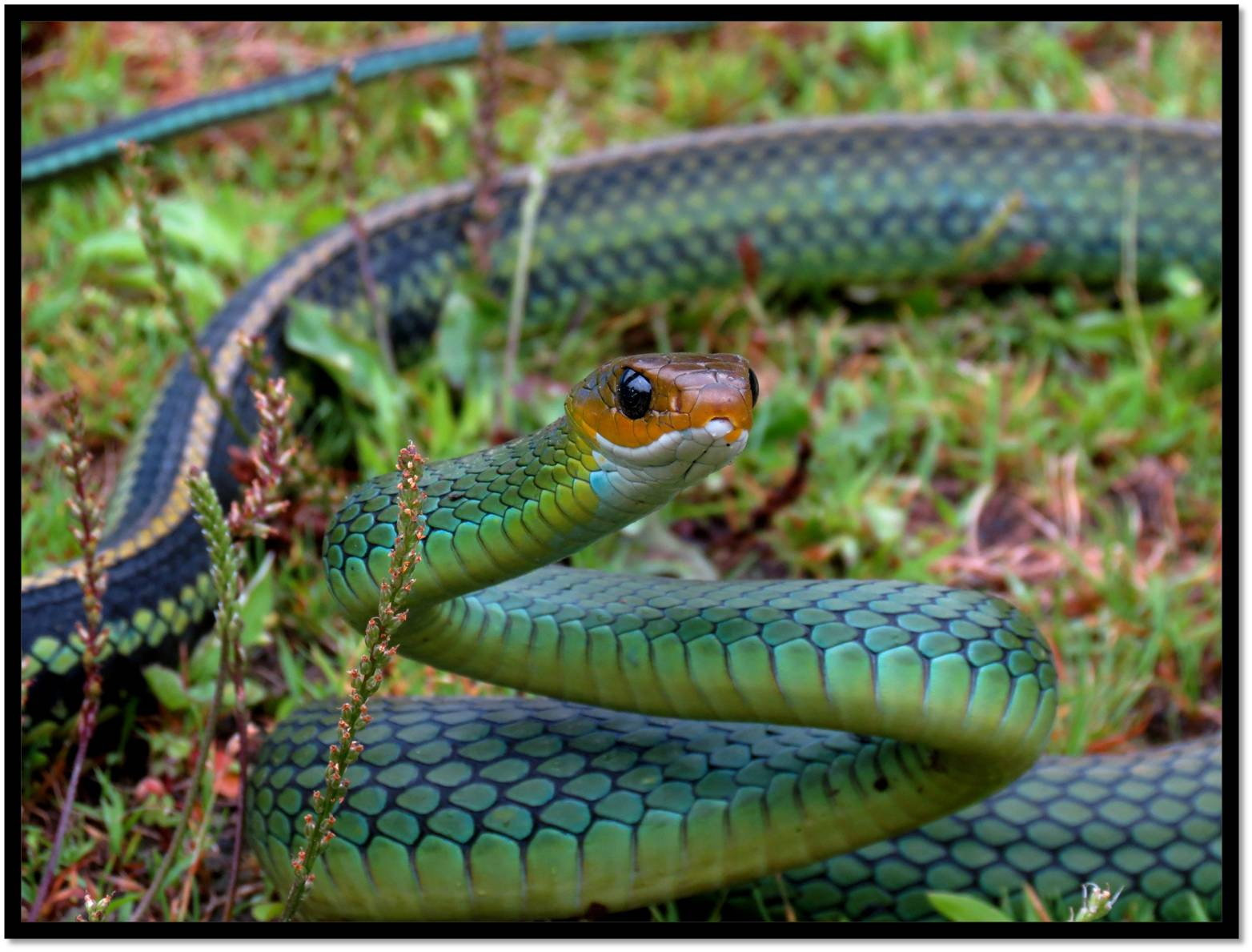
Close-up

A large snake, P. nigromarginata may attain a total length of 2.26 m (7.4 ft), which includes a tail 0.65 m (2.1 ft) long. Dorsally, it is green, with each dorsal scale edged in black. The top of the head is brownish. In adults, there are four broad black stripes on the posterior third of the body and on the tail. In juveniles the stripes extend the full length of the body and tail. Ventrally, it is greenish white. Frank Wall, a notable herpetologist, vividly described the species:

"It is difficult to realize from museum specimens the extreme beauty and brilliancy of coloring of many snakes in life, and this forcibly applies in the present instance. My specimen was a bright green of so soft a hue that the skin looked like velvet. This merged into a yellowish green anteriorly, and yellow posteriorly, the latter merging into a rich black on the tail. The black margins to the scales served to enhance the beauty of the dorsal green. The head was olive-brown with a bright yellow patch low on the temporal region. The chin and throat were white, sparsely speckled at first, more heavily later, with light caerulean blue, which merged to blue-green, then pale greenish, and finally, yellow in the length of the snake. Some gray speckling was seen beneath the tail."

Ptyas nigromarginata has often been confused with other species, particularly Ptyas dhumnades (Cantor, 1842). This misidentification is further complicated by the striking resemblance between juveniles of the two species. Both exhibit a similar black and whitish striped pattern across much of their bodies, leading to frequent errors in identification.

The secretion from the anal glands has been described as having a blackish coloration, resembling that of kraits.

=== Scalation ===
The dorsal scales are arranged in 16 to 18 rows at the midbody, reducing to 14 or 16 rows posteriorly, with the upper rows being keeled. The ventral scales range from 189 to 209, and the anal scale is divided. The subcaudal scales, numbering between 120 and 142, are paired.

The head scalation includes eight supralabials (rarely nine), with the 4th and 5th (or 5th and 6th in rare cases) touching the eye. A single loreal scale is present, along with one preocular and one presubocular scale. There are two postocular scales and a temporal scale arrangement of 2+2.

== Natural history ==
Not much is known about the natural history of this species. In contrast to other members of the Ptyas genus, the green rat snake appears to be confined to temperate forests (in the northern parts of its range), and hilly evergreen forests and montane forests (in the southern parts of its range). The apparent rareness has been attributed to its preference for dense, undisturbed forests and avoidance of human habitations.

=== Diet ===
It has been reported to feed on lizards and frogs.

=== Reproduction ===
P. nigromarginata is oviparous.
