= Webosaurs =

2009 video game

- The Webosaurs Logo
- Developer(s): Reel FX Entertainment
- Publisher(s): Reel FX Entertainment
- Engine: Adobe Flash
- Platform(s): Online
- Release: October 22, 2009
- Genre(s): MMORPG
- Mode(s): Multiplayer

Webosaurs was a massively multiplayer online game developed by American studio Reel FX Entertainment. Players explored a virtual world using dinosaur avatars and could socialize with other players, play mini-games, and decorate their homes. Beta-testing started on June 25, 2009, with the game officially launching on October 22, 2009. In 2012, the Webosaurs servers were shut down.

== History and development ==
The Webosaurs domain was originally bought in 2007 by Webosaurs Director, Jacques Panis, after noticing a lack of a popular virtual world in which his two sons could safely interact with each other and others. He soon joined VFX company, Reel FX Creative Studios, who also saw the potential to create a unique online environment for others to interact in. Reel FX hired the Metaverse Mod Squad to provide moderation services to the game, and outsourced development to two other companies. After two years of development, Webosaurs released into closed-beta on June 25, 2009, and then proceeded with 4 months of beta testing. Webosaurs officially went into general availability on October 22, 2009.

On September 30, 2011, Reel FX released a major new update, Rise of Spike. The update added new missions where the player must explore the island to figure out why the game's antagonist, Spike, is attempting to take over the island. Also released was a multiplayer battle, where players battled a large monster who served Spike. Players could also level up and earn rewards for doing so.

== Characters ==
=== Playable characters ===
- Rexxy, a Tyrannosaurus
- Horns, a Triceratops
- Pterry, a Pterodactyl
- Stretch, a Brachiosaurus

=== Non-playable characters ===
- Spike, an Ankylosaurus and the main antagonist of the game.
- Linus, a Stegosaurus who gives out quests in Rise of Spike.
- Okvango, a giant monster owned by Spike who could be fought in the multiplayer battle.
- Dr. Nanosaurus, a pterodactyl. He is also an inventor who lives inside a lab with Pterry.
- Ole Smithy, a Triceratops blacksmith who owns an armor shop.
- Stokeosaurus, a Triceratops who owns a pet shop.
- Edmarka, a Brachiosaurus who owns a shop.
- Goby, an unidentified Dromaeosauridae who shows the player a tutorial video.

== Game features ==
The "Gushing Geyser" room in Webosaurs

=== Items ===
Players could use the coins they collected from playing mini games to purchase various items from a variety of shops. There were shops for actions, armor, furniture, and virtual pets. Subscribed members could also make their own player cards and purchase dinosaur avatars.

Each player had a player card, used to store inventory such as player card backgrounds, downloads, clothing, and different avatars. Clothing could be worn by all players, however some of it was only available to subscribed-members. The same applied for furniture and for player homes (called "caves"). Subscribed members had the benefit of having a larger cave than non-subscribed members, and could play music in their cave.

=== Pets ===
Subscribed members had the option to buy virtual pets. The pets available were a smilodon, a crocodile, a porcupine and a panda.

Pets had a happiness bar that indicated their status. Pets that were not cared for would run away and had to be replaced.

=== Scrolls ===
Scrolls could be found in-game that featured short comics of the main characters discovering and exploring the island.

=== Fossil Magic ===
Players could collect and use "Fossil Magic" to cast spells on themselves and other players. The effects of the spells were purely cosmetic, like shrinking or growing an avatar. Players needed an energy called "Mojo" to use these spells, which would replenish on its own over time. Microtransactions were also available that would refill the Mojo bar instantly.

=== Webosodes ===
The website had educational videos available, featuring British TV presenter Nigel Marven as the host. In the videos, Marven would interact with and talk about wildlife and nature.

=== Membership service ===
Players could buy memberships, which allowed them access to more features than non-paying players. Memberships allowed access to more armor styles for their avatar, more furniture for their virtual homes, the ability to change into other avatar styles, the ability to own a pet in game, and the ability to buy cosmetic clothing items. Members also had a larger virtual home with extra features and a mini-game to play.

Length of membership	Price (USD)
1 month	$5.94
6 months	$29.94
1 year	$49.94

== Reception and criticism ==
Common Sense Media gave Webosaurs four out of five stars, and stated that the content was suitable for children aged eight and up. The review gave good marks for safety and educational value, but questioned the worth of paid subscriptions, summarizing: "Skip the subscription -- the free membership should keep kids entertained just fine."

== Video games ==
=== Dino Surf ===
Dino Surf was a free iPhone game released on January 25, 2010. Players could choose from the four main Webosaurs characters to play as. The player races to the finish line while maneuvering through obstacles, jumping over ramps, and running over arrows to get a speed boost. The objective of the game is to finish each stage in the shortest amount of time possible. There were four levels, each consisting of 4 stages. After completing the game, the player received a promotional code that could be used in the online game to receive 1,000 coins of in-game currency.
