= Killer Whale Islands with Nigel Marven =

Killer Whale Islands with Nigel Marven is British one-hour television special produced by Image Impact in 2007. Presented by Nigel Marven, the show looks at the wildlife of Falkland Islands during Southern Hemisphere summer. Animals included in the program are killer whales, seals, albatrosses, penguins and other birds.

This documentary premiered in 2007 on Channel 5, repeats of the show air on Eden Channel.
