= Big Cats with Nigel Marven =

- Genre: Nature documentary
- Directed by: Simon Kerfoot
- Presented by: Nigel Marven
- Composers: Steven Faux; Ian Butcher
- Country of origin: United Kingdom
- Original language: English

Production
- Executive producer: Phil Fairclough
- Producer: Nigel Marven
- Cinematography: Neil Bromhall; Rod Clarke; Simon Wagen; Mark Yates
- Editor: Angela Maddick
- Running time: 45 minutes
- Production company: Granada Wild

Original release
- Network: ITV; Animal Planet
- Release: 2001

Big Cats with Nigel Marven was a one-hour nature documentary presented by Nigel Marven and first broadcast on ITV in 2001.

Nigel Marven's mission is to meet all five big cats that can roar: leopard, snow leopard, jaguar, lion and tiger.
