= Crotalus enyo furvus =

Scientific classification
- Kingdom: Animalia
- Phylum: Chordata
- Class: Reptilia
- Order: Squamata
- Suborder: Serpentes
- Family: Viperidae
- Genus: Crotalus
- Species: C. enyo
- Subspecies: C. e. furvus

Trinomial name
- Crotalus enyo furvus Lowe & Norris, 1954

Subspecies of Mexican snake

Crotalus enyo furvus, also known as the Rosario rattlesnake or the dusky Baja California rattlesnake, is a subspecies of Baja California rattlesnake, a kind of venomous pit viper. It is named after the Latin 'furvus' meaning 'dark complexion' or 'swarthy', referring to the colouration of the subspecies. It is found on the San Quentin Plain in Baja California del Norte - due to the area's restricted and largely inaccessible habitat not much is known about the subspecies.

== Description ==
Crotalus enyo furvus is usually dark to grey brown in colouring, with specific scales different sizes and in different positions to other C. enyo subspecies. Specifically, C. e. furvus is the only subspecies of the species to display subfoveal scales. They are also known to have an average length smaller than the other two subspecies.

== Diet & behaviour ==
The Rosario rattlesnake is thought to eat mostly small mammals, using burrows to hunt and for shelter. It is known to be at least partly nocturnal.

== Reproduction ==
The dusky Baja California rattlesnake is known to give birth to less than ten neonates in one brood.
