= Nigel's Wild Wild World =

TV show presented by Nigel Marven

Nigel's Wild Wild Wild is a TV Special presented by zoologist Nigel Marven. The program ran from 2001-2002 in 27 episodes.

== List of episodes ==
=== Giants:Bears ===
Host Nigel Marven goes to Minnesota's Vince Shute Wildlife Sanctuary to observe and understand black bears; to Alaska's Katmai National Park to watch brown bears later he goes to the Canadian town of Churchill to examine polar bears.
