= David Attenborough's Natural Curiosities =

- Genre: Nature; Documentary
- Created by: UKTV
- Presented by: David Attenborough
- Country of origin: United Kingdom
- Original language: English
- No. of series: 4
- No. of episodes: 27 (list of episodes)

Production
- Running time: 30 minutes
- Production company: Humble Bee Films

Original release
- Network: W (2014–2017); Eden (2013)
- Release: 29 January 2013 – 25 June 2017

David Attenborough's Natural Curiosities is a British nature documentary series first broadcast on Eden in January 2013, Produced by Humble Bee Films, Sir David Attenborough presents the series which puts a spotlight on some of nature's evolutionary anomalies and how these curious animals continue to baffle and fascinate.

The second series began on 18 February 2014 on Watch.

The series premiered in Australia on Network Ten on 3 November 2013.
