= Prehistoric Park =

- Genre: Science fiction Adventure; Nature docu-fiction
- Starring: Nigel Marven
- Narrated by: David Jason (UK); Jim Forbes (US); Charles Wooley (Australasia broadcasts)
- Music by: Daniel Pemberton
- Country of origin: United Kingdom
- Original language: English
- No. of episodes: 6

Production
- Executive producer: Jasper James
- Running time: 48 minutes
- Production company: Impossible Pictures

Original release
- Network: ITV; Animal Planet
- Release: 22 July – 26 August 2006

Prehistoric Park is a six-part nature documentary television series that premiered on ITV on 22 July 2006 and on Animal Planet on 29 October 2006. The program was produced by Impossible Pictures, who also created Walking with Dinosaurs. Jasper James, who coproduced the Walking with... series, served as an executive producer. Each episode is an hour long including commercial breaks. Repeats of the show are broadcast in the UK on Watch.

The program is narrated by David Jason and presented and hosted by Nigel Marven. The fictional component is the theme that Nigel goes back to various geological time periods through a space-time portal, and brings live specimens of extinct animals back to the present day, where they are exhibited in a wildlife park named Prehistoric Park, which is a big area between high steep mountains and ocean, with varied environments, in what looks like KwaZulu-Natal province in South Africa.

== Story ==
The story, which is told in the style of a documentary, focuses on naturalist Nigel Marven leading missions to find and collect extinct animals from the distant past by use of a time machine. The animals are then placed in the confines of Prehistoric Park, a private wildlife park that is situated in a dry, mountainous region of an unspecified part of the world. Marven's core motivation in the series is to defy extinction and to give select extinct species a second chance at life.

== Characters ==
- Nigel Marven as himself, the main presenter and host of the show.
- Rod Arthur as Bob, the long-suffering head keeper at the park. In charge of feeding, cleaning and controlling the animals in the park.
- Suzanne McNabb as herself, the head veterinarian. Responsible for treating animals when they are sick or injured.
- Morgan Williams as Ben, one of Nigel's crew. Four Mei long attacked him for meat in his backpack. Introduced in episode 3.
- Saba Douglas-Hamilton as herself, a big cat specialist, whom Nigel invites back to catch Smilodon in episode 4.

== Locations within the park ==
When the animals are brought back to the park, they are placed into a nearby enclosure. The enclosures are named after the extinct animals that they are housing.

- Mammoth Mount: This enclosure houses the park's woolly mammoth Martha.
- T-Rex Hill: T-Rex Hill is home to the park's pair of Tyrannosaurus rex, Terence and Matilda.
- Big Cat Climb: This two part enclosure features a pair of breeding Smilodons.
- Triceratops Creek: Theo is the resident Triceratops at Triceratops Creek.
- Deinosuchus Dip: This is a huge lake, where the park's Deinosuchus is kept.
- Ornithomimus Pond: This paddock features a flock of Ornithomimus.
- The Bug House: This state-of-the-art enclosure keeps its Carboniferous period creatures safe. Its oxygen levels inside are double what they are today, maintaining a sustainable environment for the park's Arthropleura, Meganeura and Pulmonoscorpius specimens.

== Episodes ==
No.	Title	Directed by	Original release date	UK viewers (millions)
1	"T-Rex Returns"	Karen Kelly	22 July 2006	3.52
Late Cretaceous Montana, 65 million years ago; Following the construction of Prehistoric Park, zoologist Nigel Marven travels back to the Hell Creek Formation to seek out his first target for the park: one of the most famous dinosaurs, Tyrannosaurus rex. In the process, Nigel successfully brings back a Triceratops named Theo and a flock of Ornithomimus. He attempts to bring back a mother Tyrannosaurus and her two offspring, but the mother is fatally wounded in a fight with an adult male. Moments later, an asteroid strikes the Earth, but Nigel manages to lure the juveniles through a time portal before the blast front arrives. The two adolescent Tyrannosaurus are named Terrence and Matilda, and the park's employees accommodate the needs of all the dinosaurs in their new enclosures.
2	"A Mammoth Undertaking"	Karen Kelly	29 July 2006	2.73
Late Pleistocene Siberia, 10,000 years ago and 150,000 years ago; On his next mission, Nigel travels back 10,000 years to Siberia, hoping to rescue a woolly mammoth for the park. After an encounter with a cave bear, he finds an injured female mammoth whose sister has been killed by Ice Age human hunters, and manages to bring her back to the park after protecting her from cave hyenas and wolves. When the mammoth, who he names Martha, has difficulty recovering, Nigel travels back 150,000 years to study the behavior and diet of mammoths, and obtains an Elasmotherium for the park in the process. Head keeper Bob moves the Ornithomimus flock into a new enclosure with a pond so that they can filter-feed. Deducing that Martha may be lonely due to the absence of other mammoths, Nigel introduces her to the park's herd of African elephants.
3	"Dinobirds"	Sid Bennett	5 August 2006	N/A
Early Cretaceous China, 125 million years ago; Nigel travels back to the Yixian Formation in China, during the Early Cretaceous. His goal is to obtain the bizarre Microraptor, a four-winged dinosaur capable of gliding. After encountering other dinosaurs such as Incisivosaurus, Mei long, and a herd of giant titanosaurs, Nigel finally manages to capture four Microraptors. As a nearby volcano erupts, Nigel returns to the present with the Microraptors, and manages to bring the titanosaur herd back with him as well. Meanwhile, Bob discovers that one of the Ornithomimus is pregnant, and it eventually lays eggs. Head vet Suzanne trims Martha's hair to help her cool down when the Park suffers a heat wave. The two Tyrannosaurus start to fight over territory, forcing Bob to put them in holding pens while a partition is built dividing their enclosure.
4	"Saving the Sabretooth"	Sid Bennett	12 August 2006	N/A
Early and late Pleistocene South America, 1 million years ago and 10,000 years ago; For his next mission, Nigel wants to bring back an extinct species of cat, and ultimately chooses the Smilodon, or saber-toothed cat, of South America. In addition, he also decides to target Phorusrhacos, a species of giant terror bird. On his first trip to 1 million years ago, Nigel encounters a herd of Toxodon and a pride of Smilodon, and manages to bring back a Phorusrhacos. On his second trip to 10,000 years ago, he is accompanied by big cat expert Saba Douglas-Hamilton and successfully brings back a male and female Smilodon, although sadly the female's two cubs have died of starvation. At the park, the titanosaurs break out of the enclosure that Bob had built for them, so he reluctantly allows them to wander around the park. The female Ornithomimus has laid a full clutch of eggs. Two of the eggs have rolled out of the nest and she leaves them there, so Suzanne rescues them for artificial incubation, which eventually succeeds. The keepers have finished building a partition across the Tyrannosaurus enclosure to keep them apart, but tensions remain high, as Matilda's increasingly-aggressive behavior could spell danger for the park.
5	"The Bug House"	Matthew Thompson	19 August 2006	N/A
Late Carboniferous Scotland, 300 million years ago; Suzanne tries to start a breeding program for the pair of Smilodon, while Nigel chooses to target the giant bugs of the Carboniferous for his next mission. A serious emergency occurs when Matilda breaks into Terrence's enclosure and a fight breaks out. Bob and Nigel manage to stop Matilda by tranquilizing her, but Terrence is badly wounded and Suzanne tends to him. Nigel and his team travel back to the Carboniferous, where he captures a Meganeura and encounters a Crassigyrinus. At the park, an enclosed building to contain a 35% nitrox atmosphere for the Carboniferous animals is built, while Suzanne installs climbing poles in the Smilodon enclosures as environmental enrichment. Nigel catches a Pulmonoscorpius, and the team realize that a forest fire is spreading towards them. As they flee from it, Nigel manages to capture an Arthropleura, and then uses one of the titanosaurs to tow his disabled Jeep through the time portal and back to the park. The captured arthropods are put in the high-oxygen bug house, while Terrence recovers from his injury.
6	"Supercroc"	Matthew Thompson	26 August 2006	N/A
Late Cretaceous Texas, 75 million years ago; Nigel targets Deinosuchus, an ancient species of giant crocodilian, and travels back to the Aguja Formation in Cretaceous-era Texas, where he encounters Parasaurolophus, Albertosaurus, and Nyctosaurus. At the park, Bob is planting young trees to help feed the titanosaurs, while the Smilodon now have two cubs, and Martha has some trouble bonding with the elephants. Nigel eventually finds several Deinosuchus in a freshwater lake and sets up a trap for them, but his bait is stolen by a group of Troodon. Using himself as bait, he successfully lures a Deinosuchus through the portal and back to the park. Bob drives Nigel's Jeep to his next job, but is attacked by a Troodon that stowed away in the vehicle. The swerving Jeep spooks the titanosaurs, causing them to stampede through several enclosures and allowing the Ornithomimus flock, the Phorusrhacos, the Elasmotherium, and Matilda the Tyrannosaurus to escape. Matilda attacks the elephants, but Martha blocks her path. Nigel lures Matilda into chasing him, and manages to contain her. A few weeks later, more keepers have been hired and the escaped animals are all back in their enclosures. The Smilodon cubs have been weaned, Martha fully joins the elephant herd, Bob captures the Troodon, and Nigel plans his next mission, suggesting future expeditions into prehistory.

== Filming locations ==
Episode	Where set	Where filmed
1	Montana, United States	Conguillío National Park of Chile where there are plenty of Araucaria and Nothofagus trees
2	Siberia	The Yukon at Kluane National Park and Reserve and British Columbia at Tatshenshini-Alsek Provincial Park in Canada
3	China	Rotorua, New Zealand, in the Redwood, Ohakuri, and Tikitere forests, Kakahi Falls and Lake Rotokawau
4	South America	in Parque Nacional da Chapada dos Veadeiros near Brasília in Brazil
5	Coal forest in Scotland	Jonathan Dickinson State Park in southern Florida, but some of the vegetation was CGI
6	Texas, United States	The freshwater lakes of K'gari, Australia

== Home release ==
- The Region 1 DVD was released on 5 June 2007 by BCI Eclipse, under license from Fremantle Media.
- The Region 2 DVD was released in Britain on 28 August 2006 by Fremantle Media.
- The Region 4 DVD was released in Australia and surrounding islands on 6 October 2006. Charles Wooley narrated the series when broadcast on Australia's Nine Network, but the Region 4 DVD has the original narration by David Jason.
- The Region 3 DVD was released in Indonesia by Medialine Entertainment.

== Awards and nominations ==
Year	Award	Category	Work	Result	Ref.
2007	Visual Effects Society Awards	Outstanding Visual Effects in a Broadcast Series (for George Roper, Matt Fox, Laurent Hugueniot, Kevin Spruce)	Prehistoric Park	Nominated	
