= Wild Colombia with Nigel Marven =

- Genre: Nature documentary, Travel documentary
- Presented by: Nigel Marven
- Composers: Will Slater; Jonathan Slatter
- Country of origin: United Kingdom
- Original language: English
- No. of episodes: 4

Production
- Producer: Nigel Marven
- Production location: Colombia
- Editor: Rob Davies
- Camera setup: Mike Hutchinson; Simon Wagen
- Running time: 44 minutes
- Production company: Image Impact

Original release
- Network: Eden
- Release: November 2012 – December 2012

Related
- Other shows presented by Nigel Marven

Wild Colombia with Nigel Marven is a four-part British nature educational series, first broadcast on Eden Channel in November 2012. The series is presented by wildlife adventurer Nigel Marven, who explores the wilds of Colombia. He visits the Andes, the Amazon rainforest, Llanos, and both the Caribbean and Pacific coasts.

== International broadcast ==
The series premiered on Eden in the United Kingdom. In New Zealand, TV3 has shown the series, in Europe Spektrum TV has shown the program, and in India it aired on Animal Planet. In Canada it was shown on Discovery World and in Latin America it was shown on Discovery Channel.

== Links ==
- Wild Colombia with Nigel Marven on Eden Channel website
- Wild Colombia with Nigel Marven on TV3 website
