= Healthy Planet =

Organization

Healthy Planet Foundation
- Formation: December 2007
- Founder: Shaylesh Patel
- Dissolved: 17 October 2016
- Type: Charitable organisation
- Purpose: Environment, Sustainability, Conservation
- Location: London, United Kingdom
- Region served: United Kingdom

Healthy Planet Foundation was an environmental charity in the United Kingdom formed in 2007 by Shaylesh Patel, on the ethos that small changes together will build sustainable, healthy communities leaving a positive legacy for future generations. Healthy Planet championed grassroots and green causes that promoted healthy living.

The charity expanded rapidly after starting to offer owners of unoccupied retail properties a way to reduce their business rates (local property taxes) in return for a donation of half of the saving, but this method of fund raising has proved controversial in some quarters.

== History ==
Shaylesh Patel first incorporated Healthy Planet Limited (registered number 06294326) on 27 June 2007. This was a private limited liability company not limited by guarantee. On 27 December 2007 Healthy Planet Foundation was incorporated, a company limited by guarantee with an exemption from using the word "Limited" in its name, and it was that company that registered as a charity. Healthy Planet Limited was purchased from Patel by Healthy Planet Foundation for a nominal sum during the year ended 26 June 2013 in order to consolidate all of the charity's assets in one place.

Healthy Planet Foundation's impact was largely minimal until 2010 when it started to offer United Kingdom high-street landlords tax breaks in return for donations. This followed changes in the system of local property taxation in England and Wales in 2008.

== Legal status ==
Healthy Planet was a company limited by guarantee, registered in England at Companies House (number 06460524, incorporated 27 December 2007) and registered with the Charity Commission for England and Wales (registered number 1122475) and the Scottish Charity Regulator.

The charity's commercial activities took place through its wholly owned subsidiary Healthy Planet Community CIC, a community interest company, registered number 06463663, which was incorporated 4 January 2008.

== Activities ==
=== Overview ===
All the Initiatives listed below are similar insofar as they are all able to 'appear and disappear' (pop-up) quickly; this is due to the fact that Healthy Planet's business model of taking on buildings, often for short periods of time, requires such specifically designed initiatives in order for them to offer the tax breaks that they rely on for funding. Retrofitting their charity activities to gain tax breaks has generated controversy which they have attempted to address in their 2013 accounts which can be downloaded from their website.

=== Books for Free ===
The "Books for Free" initiative sources secondhand books that otherwise might be destined for pulping. Healthy Planet redistributes these books - for free - throughout communities via its short term Books for Free centres nationwide. By doing so, they aim to reduce the quantity of waste to landfill each year. They say, "There's no catch and the only restriction is that a maximum of 3 books can be taken at any one time." The 35th shop opened in Derby in July 2014.

=== Stuff for Free ===
Healthy Planet's "Stuff for Free" initiative is a series of giant community reuse events - helping redistribute good quality stuff to a new home, where it will be valued. The initiative promotes upcycling, recycling and waste minimisation. By re-directing materials which would otherwise go to landfill, Healthy Planet facilitates the re-distribution of all sorts of items from one person to another. It operates on the belief that one person's trash is another's treasure.

=== Healthy Spaces ===
Healthy Spaces utilises retail or warehouse space which are empty and provides new and grassroot causes with the space they need to get started. The charity creates a link between commercial landlords and the charity sector by developing partnerships with commercial landlords that have empty units, such as retail units, banks, warehouses and restaurants. It then invites Third sector like-minded organisations to collaborate by occupying one of the spaces, rent free giving them a physical presence in the community to make an environmental difference.

=== Conservation Community ===
The Conservation Community is designed to raise awareness of grass root conservation projects worldwide. Healthy Planet supports projects in national, regional or community designated protected areas, in public spaces that include realistic, tangible actions and projects that have specific educational or scientific impact.

== Controversial fundraising ==
Healthy Planet has attracted attention for its approach to fund raising. By "occupying" empty shops, which may amount to as little as being granted a short lease and putting up posters in an unstaffed shop, the landlord may save 80% on their business rates (local property taxes). Healthy Planet then ask the landlord to make a "donation" of half of that saving to the charity. In 2009, Blacks Leisure paid Healthy Planet to occupy 77 empty stores in order to reduce its tax liabilities.

Since using this scheme, Healthy Planet's total income has increased dramatically, from £13,000 to £1.1M in the space of twelve months according to figures in the 2010 accounts, causing the British tax authorities to enquire into the tax affairs of the charity. Roger Messenger, president of the Institute of Revenues Rating and Valuation, not referring specifically to Healthy Planet, commented "There are some organisations which are pushing this into the area of a scam" and that such schemes were "very common" in secondary and tertiary shopping streets where shops were "unlikely to ever be reoccupied". According to British law, charity shops should be "wholly or mainly used for the sale of donated goods" in order to qualify for reduced business rates.

== Financial results ==
According to (consolidated) accounts filed at the Charity Commission, the financial results of the charity were as follows:

Year Ended	Income	Spending
26 Jun 2009	£13,108	£8,466
26 Jun 2010	£1,144,534	£970,217
26 Jun 2011	£1,982,399	£1,602,211
26 Jun 2012	£2,090,285	£1,936,435
26 Jun 2013	£1,831,961	£1,732,630
26 Jun 2014	£2,092,801	£2,480,182

== Liquidation ==
The independent regulator the Charity Commission opened an investigation into Healthy Planet in June 2015 after it reported a loss of £345,000 as a consequence of alleged fraud. Both Healthy Planet Foundation (Company No. 06460524) and Healthy Planet Community CIC (Company No. 06463663) entered administration on 13 November 2015 and were wound up by voluntary creditors liquidation on 17 October 2016.
