= Crotalus enyo cerralvensis =

Scientific classification
- Kingdom: Animalia
- Phylum: Chordata
- Class: Reptilia
- Order: Squamata
- Suborder: Serpentes
- Family: Viperidae
- Genus: Crotalus
- Species: C. enyo
- Subspecies: C. e. cerralvensis

Trinomial name
- Crotalus enyo cerralvensis Cliff, 1954

Subspecies of Mexican rattlesnake

Crotalus enyo cerralvensis, also known as the Cerralvo rattlesnake, is a subspecies of Baja California rattlesnake, a kind of Venomous pit viper, and is named after the island it is found on, Isla Cerralvo, Mexico. The subspecies was described in 1954 by Frank S. Cliff.

== Description ==
Adult Crotalus enyo cerralvensis range from 1.5 – 2.5 ft. Out of the species' subspecies, C. e. cerralvensis is known to have the highest head-to-body ratio as well as a specific number of scales which can be used to distinguish it from its sister subspecies.

== Diet ==
The Cerralvo rattlesnake is known to eat lizards, mammals and occasionally centipedes.

== Reproduction ==
Crotalus enyo cerralvensis are known to give birth to 2–7 young per brood – with neonates being found between July and October.
