= Whale Adventure with Nigel Marven =

- Genre: Nature documentary
- Directed by: Tim Pritchard
- Presented by: Nigel Marven
- Narrated by: Nigel Marven
- Composer: Stephen Selby
- Country of origin: United Kingdom
- Original language: English
- No. of episodes: 4

Production
- Producer: Nigel Marven
- Production locations: Mexico, United States, Canada
- Cinematography: Mike Garner
- Editor: Rob Davies
- Running time: 44 minutes
- Production company: Image Impact

Original release
- Network: Channel 5, Eden
- Release: March 2013 – April 2013

Whale Adventure with Nigel Marven is four-part British nature documentary series presented by Nigel Marven and created by Image Impact for Channel 5 in association with Eden. It has premiered in March 2013 for four weeks. In the series, Nigel Marven follows the gray whales on their migration through North American Pacific coast, from Baja California in Mexico to Alaska.

== Links ==
- Whale Adventure with Nigel Marven on Channel 5 website
