= Shaylesh Patel =

British accountant (born 1971)

Shailesh Vasant Patel (born 1971) is a British accountant who, in 2007, founded the Healthy Planet Foundation. He regards himself as a social entrepreneur.

Patel is a graduate of Bristol University (1988–1991, Economics & Accounting). He joined accounting firm Ernst & Young and achieved his ACA qualification in 1994.

Patel's father emigrated to the Midlands in England from India in 1960, working at first as a road-sweeper and then as a bus driver. Patel's mother followed in 1962.
