= Yunnan Adventure with Nigel Marven =

- Genre: Nature documentary
- Presented by: Nigel Marven
- Narrated by: Nigel Marven
- Composer: Will Slater
- Country of origin: United Kingdom
- Original language: English

Production
- Producer: Nigel Marven
- Production locations: Yunnan Province, China
- Cinematography: Si Wagen; Nathan Ridler; Wang Bangji
- Editor: Rob Davies
- Running time: 44 minutes
- Production company: Image Impact

Original release
- Network: Eden, Yunnan TV
- Release: February 2012

Related
- Untamed China with Nigel Marven

Yunnan Adventure with Nigel Marven is one-hour British nature documentary made by Image Impact production company for Eden Channel and Yunnan TV, which was first broadcast in February 2012.

In the program, wildlife presenter and adventurer Nigel Marven travels amongst mountains of Yunnan Province in southern China in search of selected species of animals, including hoolock gibbon, one of the most endangered primates on Earth.

== List of animals featured in the program ==
- Green peacock
- Black snub-nosed monkey
- Eight-lined keelback
- Chinese giant salamander
- Bear macaque
- Chinese beauty snake
- Red panda
- Black-breasted leaf turtle
- Indian giant flying squirrel
- Asian black bear
- Hoolock gibbon
- Black-necked crane

== Links ==
- Fremantle Brand
