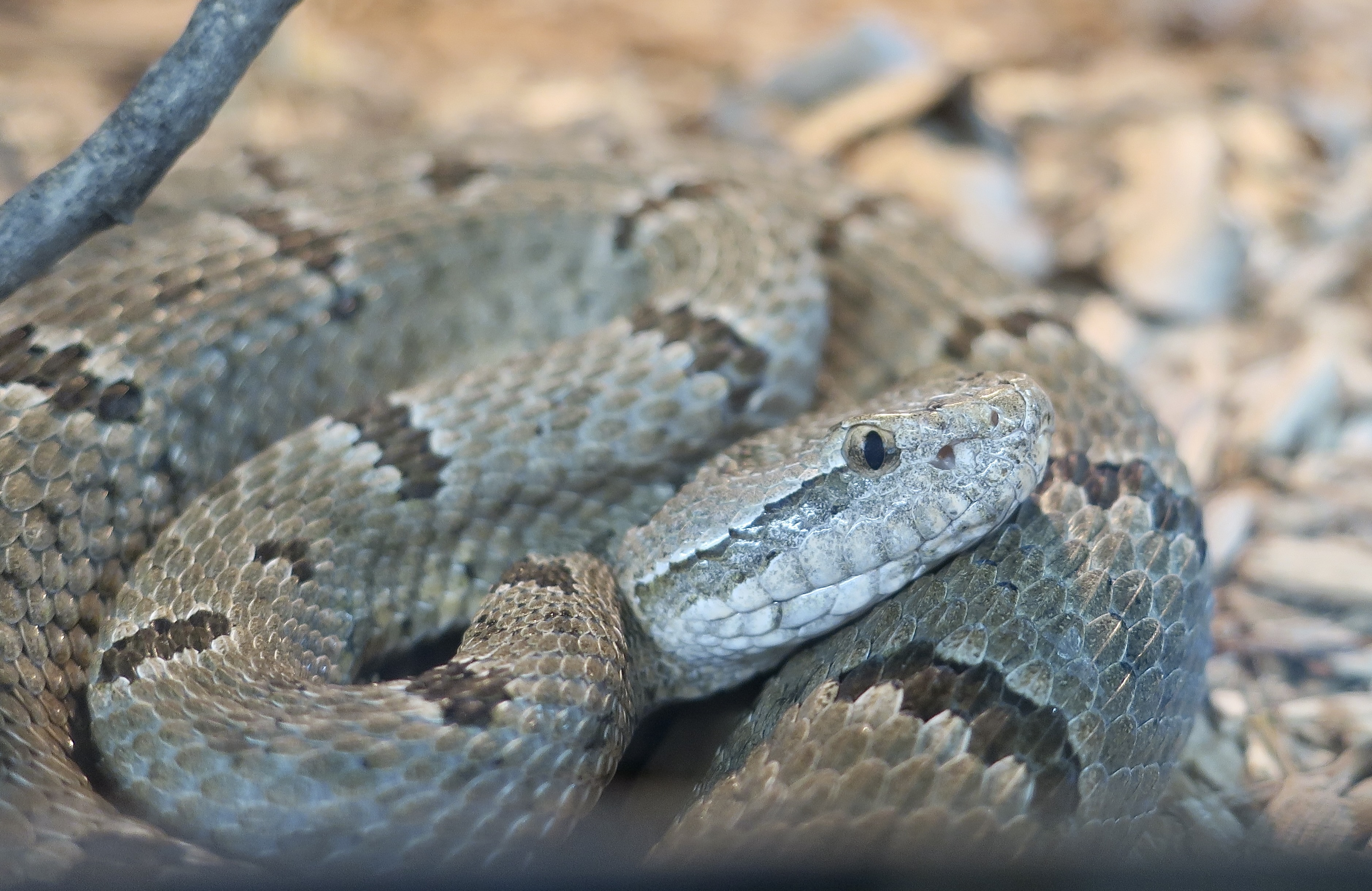

Scientific classification
- Kingdom: Animalia
- Phylum: Chordata
- Class: Reptilia
- Order: Squamata
- Suborder: Serpentes
- Family: Viperidae
- Genus: Crotalus
- Species: C. lepidus
- Subspecies: C. l. maculosus

Trinomial name
- Crotalus lepidus maculosus W. Tanner, Dixon & Harris, 1972

= Crotalus lepidus maculosus =

Subspecies of snake

Crotalus lepidus maculosus, the Durangan rock rattlesnake, is a Mexican subspecies of the rock rattlesnake, a venomous species of pit viper.

== Description ==
The Durangan rock rattlesnake can be distinguished from its sister subspecies as it displays an average of 29-31 small oval spots on its sides which the other subspecies lack, with the ground colour between the spots being heavily pigmented. It also has a difference in numbers of specific scales, as well as being smaller than its adjacent subspecies.
