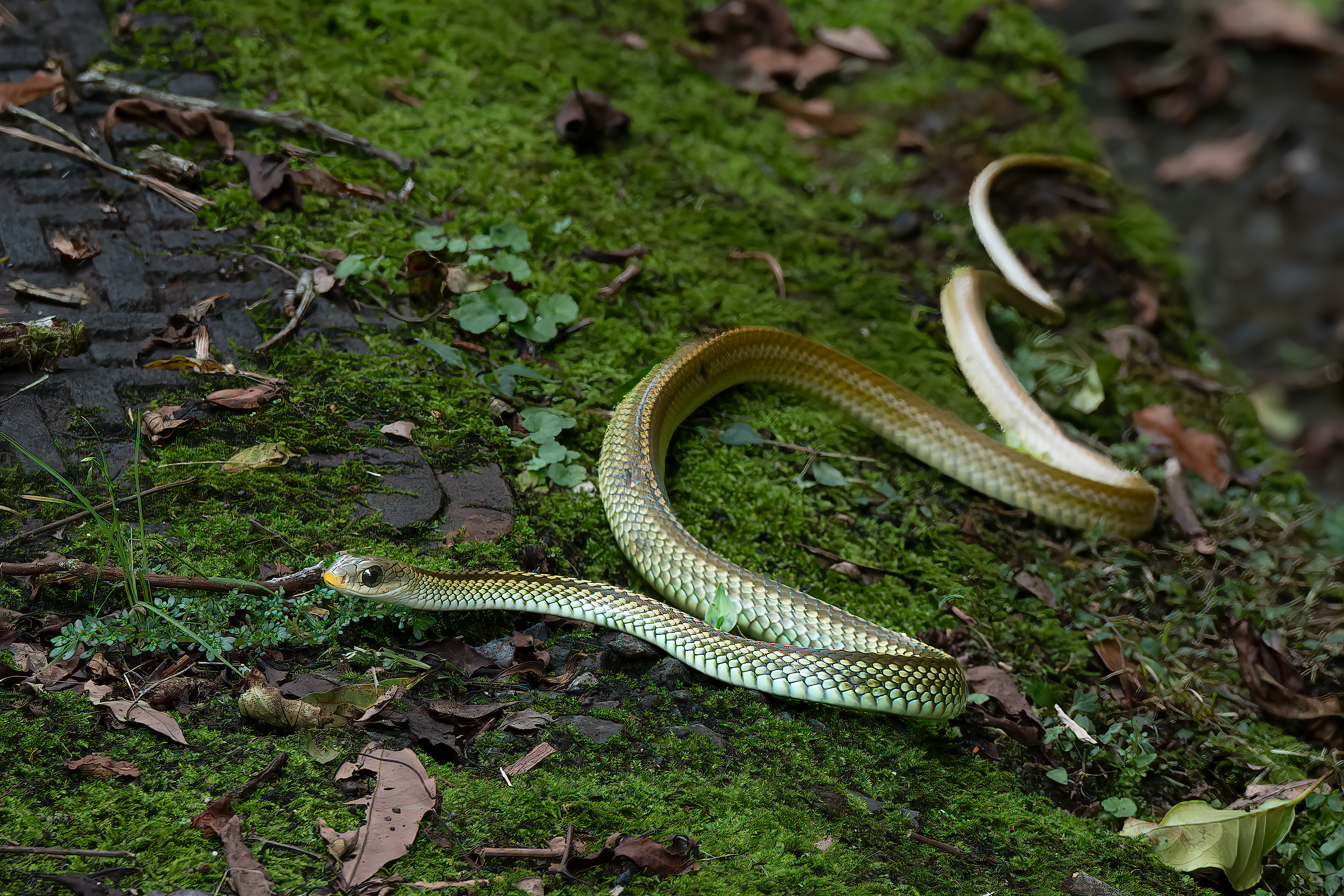

Conservation status
- Least Concern (IUCN 3.1)

Scientific classification
- Kingdom: Animalia
- Phylum: Chordata
- Class: Reptilia
- Order: Squamata
- Suborder: Serpentes
- Family: Colubridae
- Genus: Ptyas
- Species: P. dhumnades

Binomial name
- Ptyas dhumnades (Cantor, 1842)

= Ptyas dhumnades =

Species of snake

Ptyas dhumnades, commonly known as big-eyed rat snake, is a species of snake in the family Colubridae. It is found in China, Vietnam, and Taiwan.

== Distribution ==
The species is widespread in South China (Anhui, Chongqin, Gansu, Fujian, Guangdong, Guangxi, Guizhou, Hebei, Henan, Hubei, Hunan, Jiangsu, Jiangxi, Shanxi, Shaanxi, Shanghai, Sichuan, Tianjin,Yunnan, Zhejiang), Vietnam, and Taiwan. It is found at elevations between 50 m and 2,000 m.

== Description ==
It is often confused with other members of the genus Ptyas, particularly Ptyas nigromarginata due to overlapping features but has distinct characteristics that set it apart. It is not entirely clear if these two species are sympatric.

=== Scalation ===
Dorsal scale rows: 16; Ventrals: 187–194; Subcaudals: 108-116; Loreals: 1; supralabials: 8; Subralabials entering eye 4-5; Number of dorsal scale rows at midbody keeled: 2 or 4 ; 9: Two distinct medial series of dorsal scales throughout: present ; 10: Distinct longitudinal stripes on lateral side at two-heads length before vent position: present; 11: Anterior part of body green: - false.
