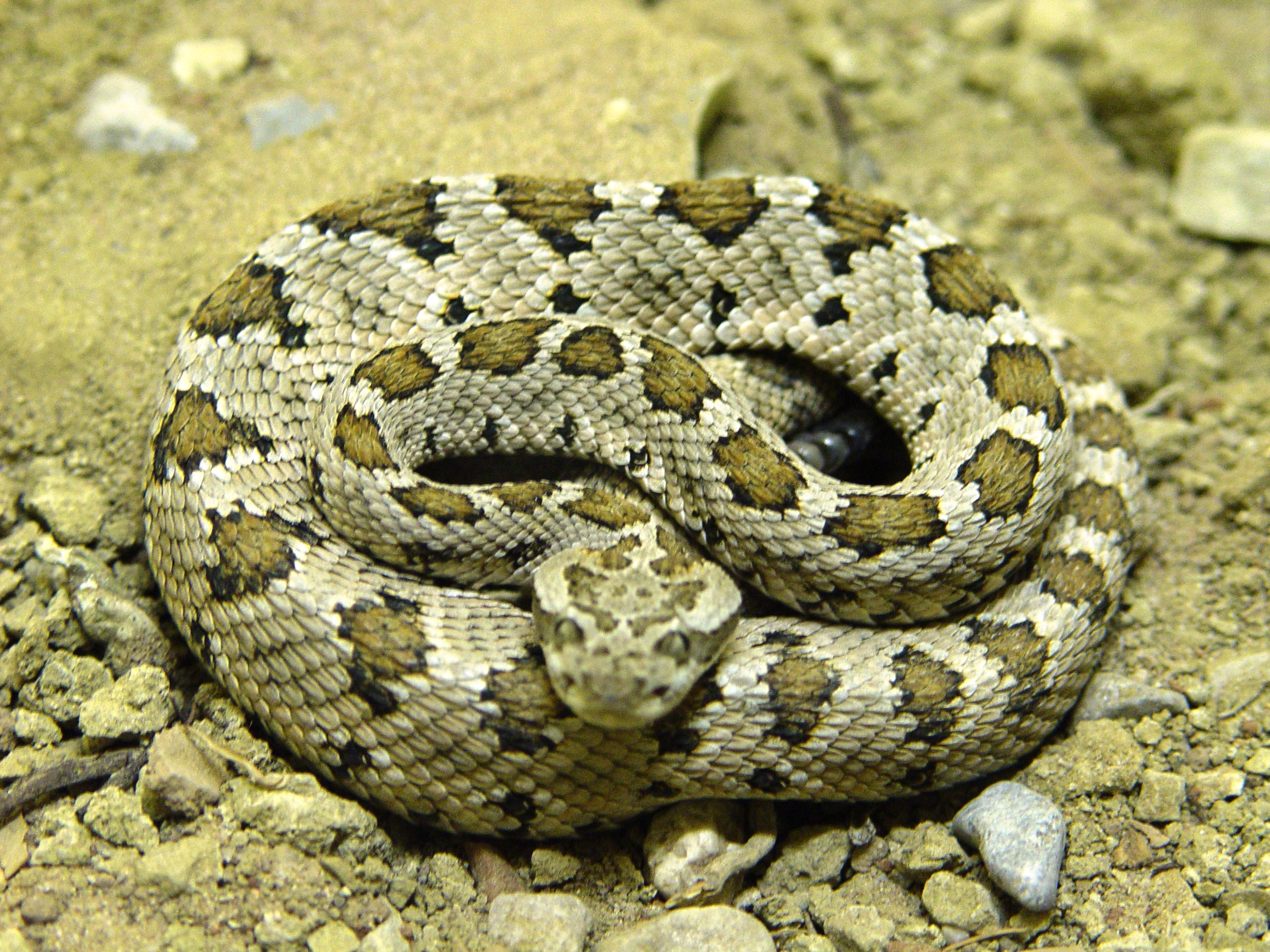

Conservation status
- Least Concern (IUCN 3.1)

Scientific classification
- Kingdom: Animalia
- Phylum: Chordata
- Class: Reptilia
- Order: Squamata
- Suborder: Serpentes
- Family: Viperidae
- Genus: Crotalus
- Species: C. enyo

Binomial name
- Crotalus enyo (Cope, 1861)
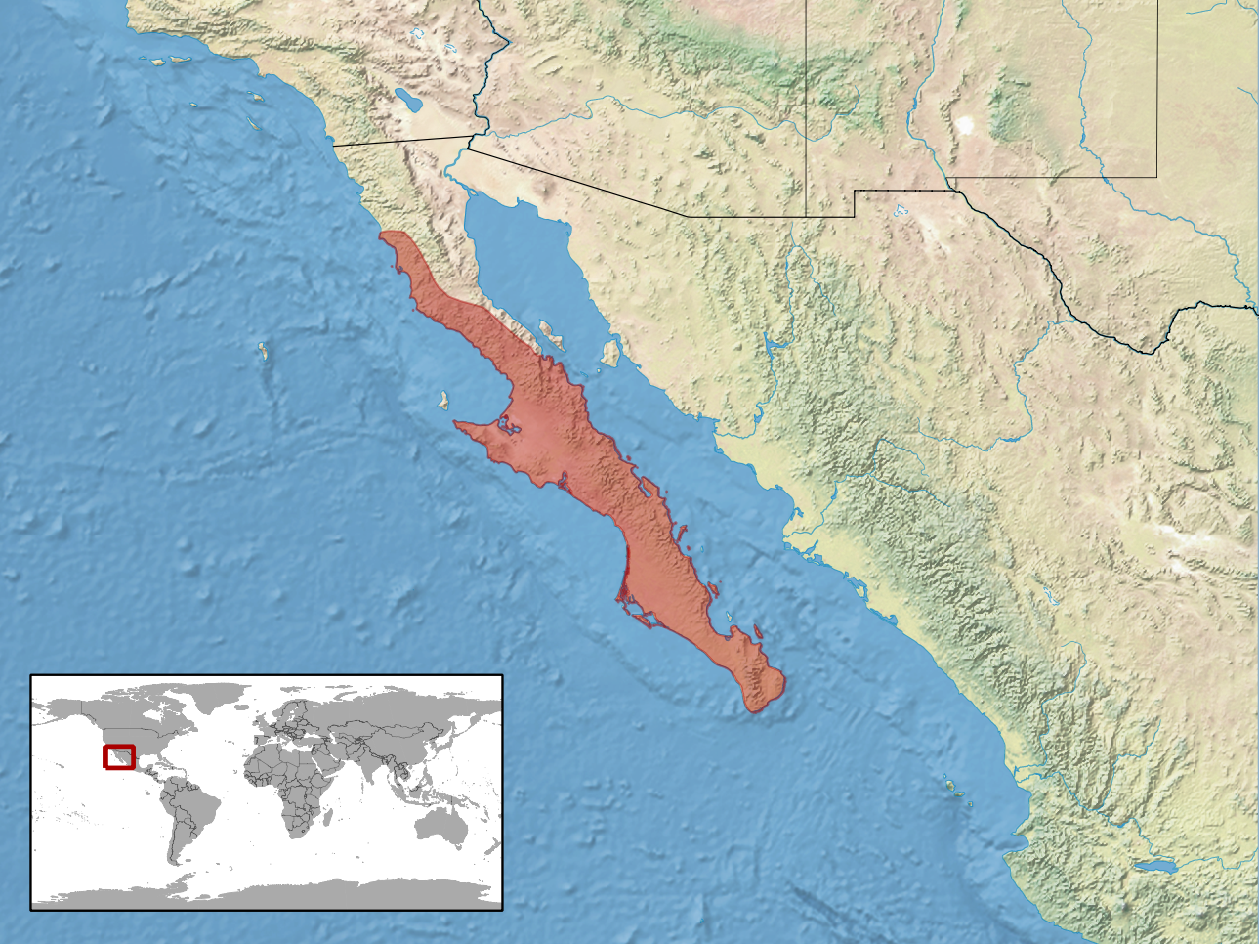

Synonyms
- Caudisona enyo Cope, 1861; Crotalus enyo – Cope, 1875; [Crotalus oreganus] var. enyo – Garman, 1884; Crotalus tigris (part) – Boulenger, 1896; Crotalus confluentus enyo – Amaral, 1929; Crotalus enyo enyo – Lowe & Norris, 1954; Crotalus enyo – Beaman & Grismer, 1994

= Crotalus enyo =

Species of snake

Crotalus enyo, commonly known as the Baja California rattlesnake or Lower California rattlesnake, is a pit viper species native to the coast and islands of northwestern Mexico. Like all other pit vipers, it is venomous. Three subspecies are currently recognized, including the nominate subspecies described here.

== Description ==
The maximum reported length of this species is 89.8 cm (35.4 in) (Klauber, 1972). It is sexually dimorphic, with the males typically being larger than the females. The head is remarkably small and narrow, while the eyes are proportionately large.

== Geographic range ==
In western Mexico in the north, it is found in the Baja California Peninsula from around Río San Telmo on the west coast and from opposite Isla Angel de la Guarda on the gulf coast, south to Cabo San Lucas. It is also found in the Gulf of California on the islands of San Marcos, Carmen, San José, San Francisco, Partida del Sur, Espírita Santo and Cerralvo. Off the Pacific coast, it is also found on the island of San Margarita. The type locality is "Cabo San Lucas, Baja California Sur".

== Habitat ==
It prefers desert, but in the northwestern part of its range, it can be found in chaparral country, while in the cape region (Sierra de San Lázaro), it occurs in pine-oak and tropical deciduous forest. It can be found in rocky areas with arid thorn scrub and cacti, but sometimes also in sand dunes. It is often attracted to human habitation, where it has been found in piles of refuse.

== Conservation status ==
This species is classified as Least Concern on the IUCN Red List (v3.1, 2001). Species are listed as such due to their wide distribution, presumed large population, or because they are unlikely to be declining fast enough to qualify for listing in a more threatened category. The population trend was stable when assessed in 2007.

== Feeding ==
Snakes of this species, regardless of their size, are known to eat small rodents, lizards, and centipedes. This is in contrast to many other rattlesnake species that prey on lizards almost exclusively as juveniles, switching to mammals as adults. With C. enyo, small snakes eat lizards more often than do large ones, and large snakes eat mammals more often than do small ones. Adults also prey on large centipedes of the genus Scolopendra.

== Reproduction ==
Captive specimens have produced litters of two to seven young. Newborn specimens with lengths of between 20.6 and 22.2 cm (8.1 and 8.7 in) have been mentioned. Grismer (2002) reported finding neonates in the wild between late July and mid October, which would indicate the species mates in the spring and gives birth in the summer or early fall.

== Subspecies ==
Subspecies	Taxon author	Common name	Geographic range
C. e. cerralvensis	Cliff, 1954	Cerralvo Island rattlesnake	Isla Cerralvo in the Gulf of California
C. e. enyo	(Cope, 1861)	Lower California rattlesnake	Baja California, Mexico, from about El Rosario southward down the peninsula
C. e. furvus	Lowe & Norris, 1954	Rosario rattlesnake	Baja California, Mexico, from about Río San Telmo south to around El Rosario

== Taxonomy ==
All three of the current subspecies were recognized by Beaman and Grismer (1994) in their review, but they indicated C. e. furvus should not be considered a separate subspecies, and C. e. cerralvensis would best be considered a full species.
