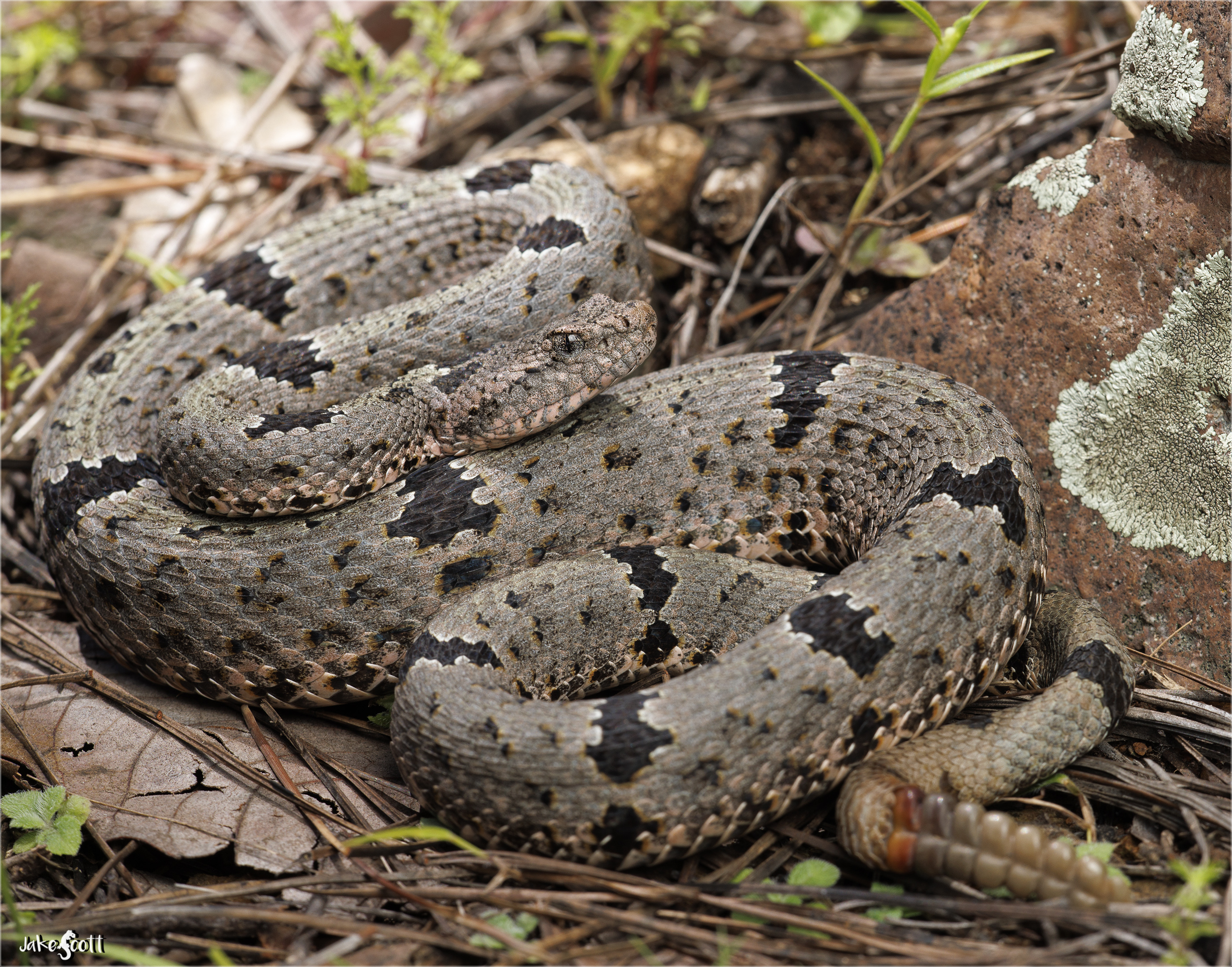

Conservation status
- Least Concern (IUCN 3.1)

Scientific classification
- Kingdom: Animalia
- Phylum: Chordata
- Class: Reptilia
- Order: Squamata
- Suborder: Serpentes
- Family: Viperidae
- Genus: Crotalus
- Species: C. lepidus

Binomial name
- Crotalus lepidus (Kennicott, 1861)
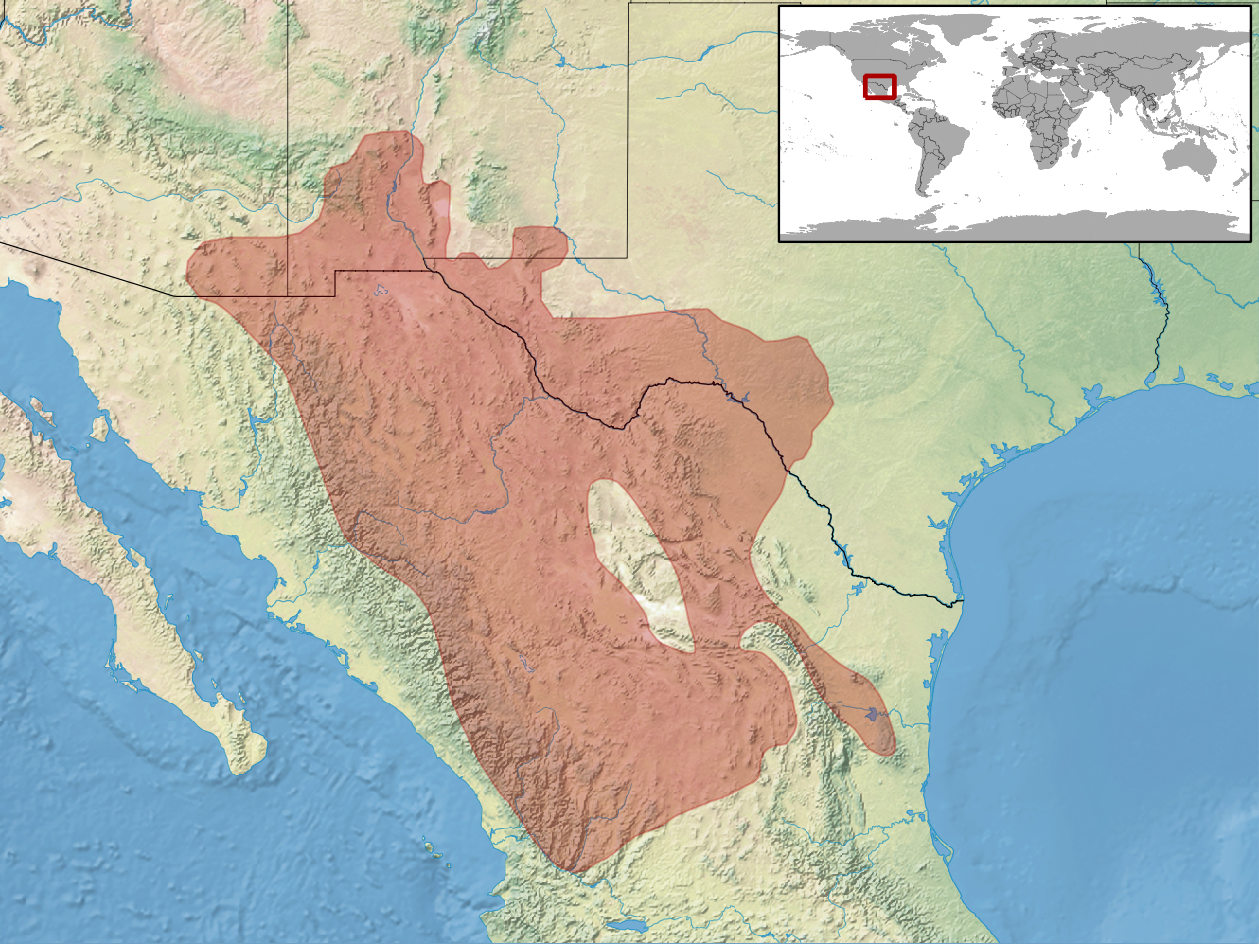

Synonyms
- Caudisona lepida Kennicott, 1861; A[ploaspis]. lepida – Cope, 1867; Crotalus lepidus – Cope, 1883; Crotalus [tigris var.] palmeri Garman, 1887; Crotalus palmeri – Günther, 1895; Crotalus lepidus – Boulenger, 1896; Crotalus lepidus lepidus – Gloyd, 1936

= Crotalus lepidus =

Species of snake

Crotalus lepidus is a venomous pit viper species found in the southwestern United States and northern central Mexico. Four subspecies are currently recognized, including the nominate subspecies described here.

== Description ==
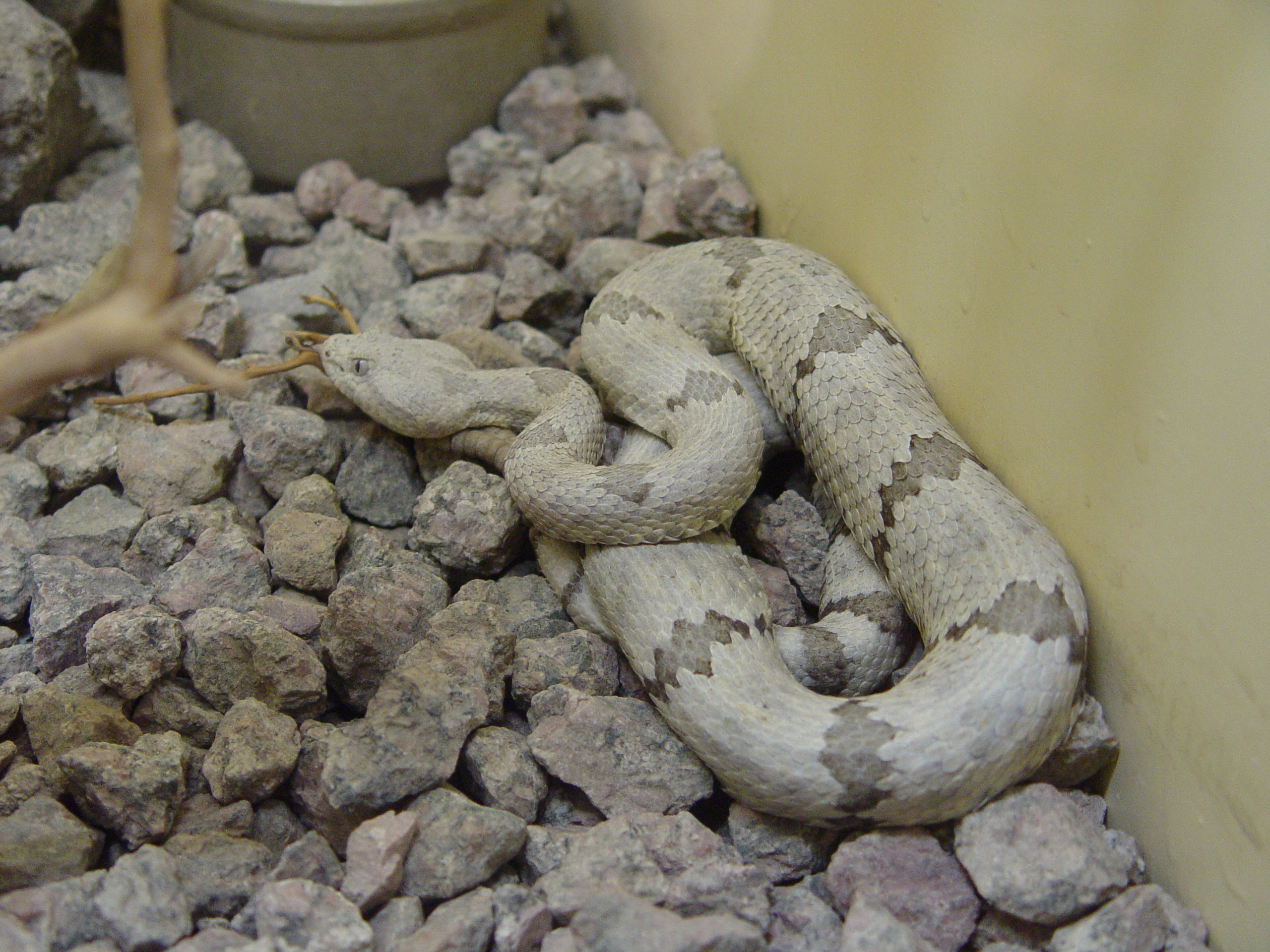
C. lepidus

This small species rarely exceeds 32 in (81.3 cm) in length. It has a large, rounded head, and fairly heavy body for its size, with eyes with vertical pupils. Like other rattlesnakes, its tail has a rattle, which is composed of keratin. Each time the snake sheds its skin, a new segment is added to the rattle. However, the rattle is fragile and may break off, and the frequency of shedding can vary. So, the snake's age cannot be determined by the number of segments or length of the rattle.

The color pattern varies greatly, but generally reflects the color of the rock in the snake's natural environment. Snakes found near areas of predominantly limestone tend to be a light grey in color, with darker grey banding. Snakes found at higher altitudes have darker colors. Specimens of the mottled rock rattlesnake (C. l. lepidus) from the Davis Mountains region often exhibit a more pink coloration, with dark-grey speckling rather than distinct banding. The banded rock rattlesnake (C. l. klauberi) gets its common name from its distinctive, clean banding, often with little speckling or mottling.

== Common names ==
Its common names include: blue rattlesnake, eastern rock rattlesnake, green rattlesnake, little green rattlesnake, pink rattlesnake, rock rattlesnake, Texas rock rattlesnake, and white rattlesnake.

== Geographic range ==
This snake is found in the Southwestern United States (southeastern Arizona, southern New Mexico, and southwestern Texas) and northern central Mexico. The type locality given is "Presidio del Norte and Eagle Pass" (Texas, USA). H.M. Smith and Taylor (1950) emended the type locality to "Presidio (del Norte), Presidio County, Texas".

== Conservation status ==
This species is classified as Least Concern by the IUCN Red List of Threatened Species (v3.1, 2001). The population trend was stable when assessed in 2006. Its habitat is largely inaccessible and not majorly threatened by human development; however, it is gradually becoming more fragmented.

It is listed as a threatened species by New Mexico.

== Behavior ==
In general, these snakes are not aggressive. They tend to rely heavily on their camouflage, and will often not strike or even rattle their tails unless physically harassed. They spend most of their lives in rocky outcroppings and talus slopes, from which they are named. Man-made road cuts are often a favorite place. They are primarily nocturnal. Most people who get bitten by the rock rattlesnake are often hiking among rocks, where it lives. If someone steps or accidentally touches it, the snake's immediate reaction is to bite.

== Feeding ==
Their diets consist of small mammals, lizards, and sometimes frogs. They are often more active at colder temperatures than other rattlesnake species.

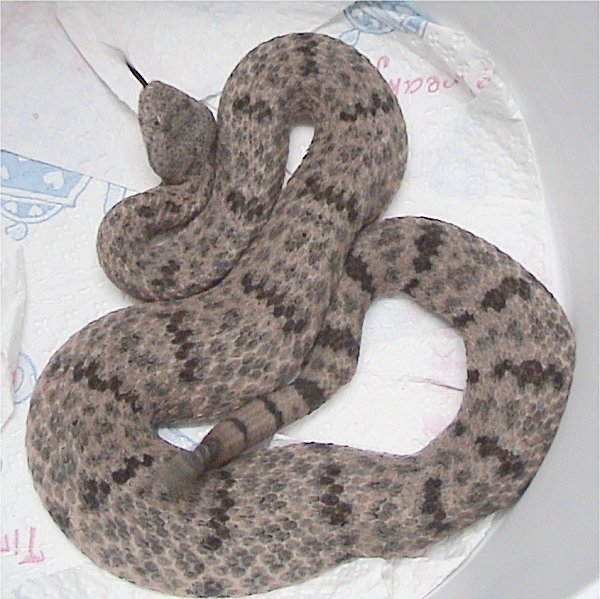
C. l. lepidus

== Captivity ==
Two subspecies, C. l. lepidus and C. l. klauberi, are frequently available in the exotic animal trade, and are well represented in zoos around the world. They are sought after for their wide array of potential colorations and typically docile nature. Most available are wild-caught; captive breeding, while not unheard of, is not commonplace. The two subspecies found only in Mexico are not often found in captivity outside of Mexico.

== Reproduction ==
These snakes are ovoviviparous. They breed once a year, in the spring, and give birth about four months later to six to eight young. The young generally look like miniature versions of the parents and take three or more years to mature.

== Venom ==
Their venom is primarily a hemotoxin, but has been known to have significant neurotoxic effects, as well. While not type-specific, the polyvalent antivenin CroFab is generally used to treat serious envenomations.

== Subspecies ==
Subspecies	Taxon author	Common name	Geographic range
C. l. klauberi	Gloyd, 1936	Banded rock rattlesnake	Arizona, New Mexico, Texas, Mexico (south to Jalisco)
C. l. lepidus	Kennicott, 1861	Mottled rock rattlesnake	New Mexico, Texas, Mexico (Chihuahua)
C. l. maculosus	W. Tanner, Dixon & Harris, 1972	Durango Rock rattlesnake	Mexico (Durango, Sinaloa, Nayarit, Jalisco)

A recent review showed that the Tamaulipan rock rattlesnake appears to be a separate species, Crotalus morulus
