= Institute of Revenues Rating and Valuation =

The Institute of Revenues Rating and Valuation (IRRV) is the professional body for those working in the field of revenues, benefits and valuation in the United Kingdom. It is the largest professional association in the field of benefits, revenues and valuation with over 5,000 members. The institute's focus is on supporting members' professional development and sharing best practices.

The institute has its roots in the Metropolitan Rate Collectors Association, founded on 1 April 1882 by the rate collectors of London. It became the Association of Rate Collectors and Assistant Overseers in 1911, the Incorporated Association of Rating and Valuation Officers (RVA) in 1927 and the Institute of Revenues Rating and Valuation (IRRV) in 1990.
