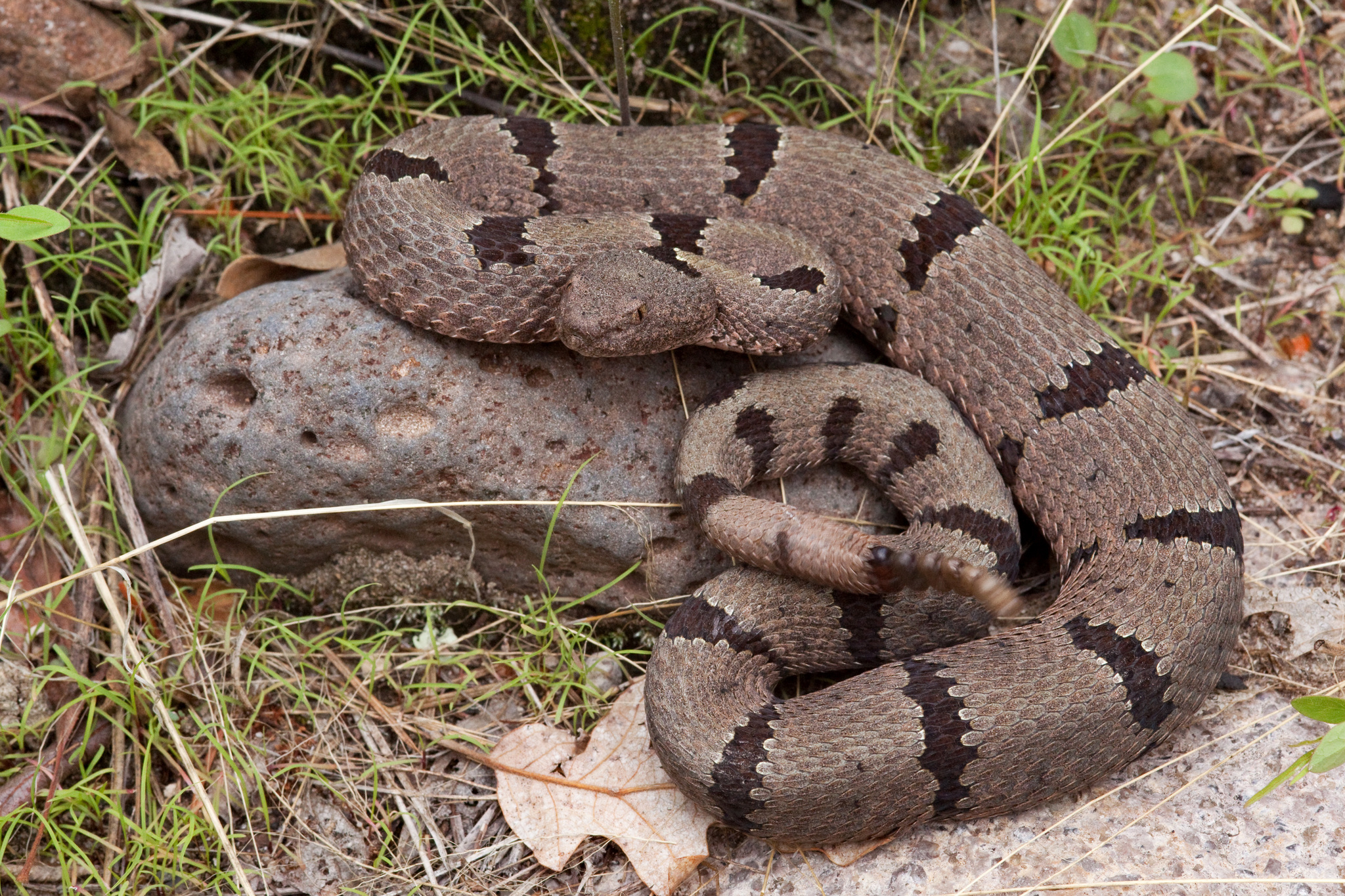

Scientific classification
- Kingdom: Animalia
- Phylum: Chordata
- Class: Reptilia
- Order: Squamata
- Suborder: Serpentes
- Family: Viperidae
- Genus: Crotalus
- Species: C. lepidus
- Subspecies: C. l. klauberi

Trinomial name
- Crotalus lepidus klauberi Gloyd, 1936

= Crotalus lepidus klauberi =

Subspecies of snake

Crotalus lepidus klauberi is a venomous pitviper subspecies native to the southwestern United States and adjacent northern Mexico.

== Geographic range ==
In the United States C. l. klauberi is found in Arizona, New Mexico, and Texas.

In Mexico it is found in the Mexican states of Baja California, Chihuahua, Coahuila, Durango, Jalisco, Nuevo León, San Luis Potosí, Sonora, Tamaulipas, and Zacatecas.

== Etymology ==
The specific name or epithet, klauberi, is in honor of American herpetologist and rattlesnake expert Laurence M. Klauber.

== Description ==
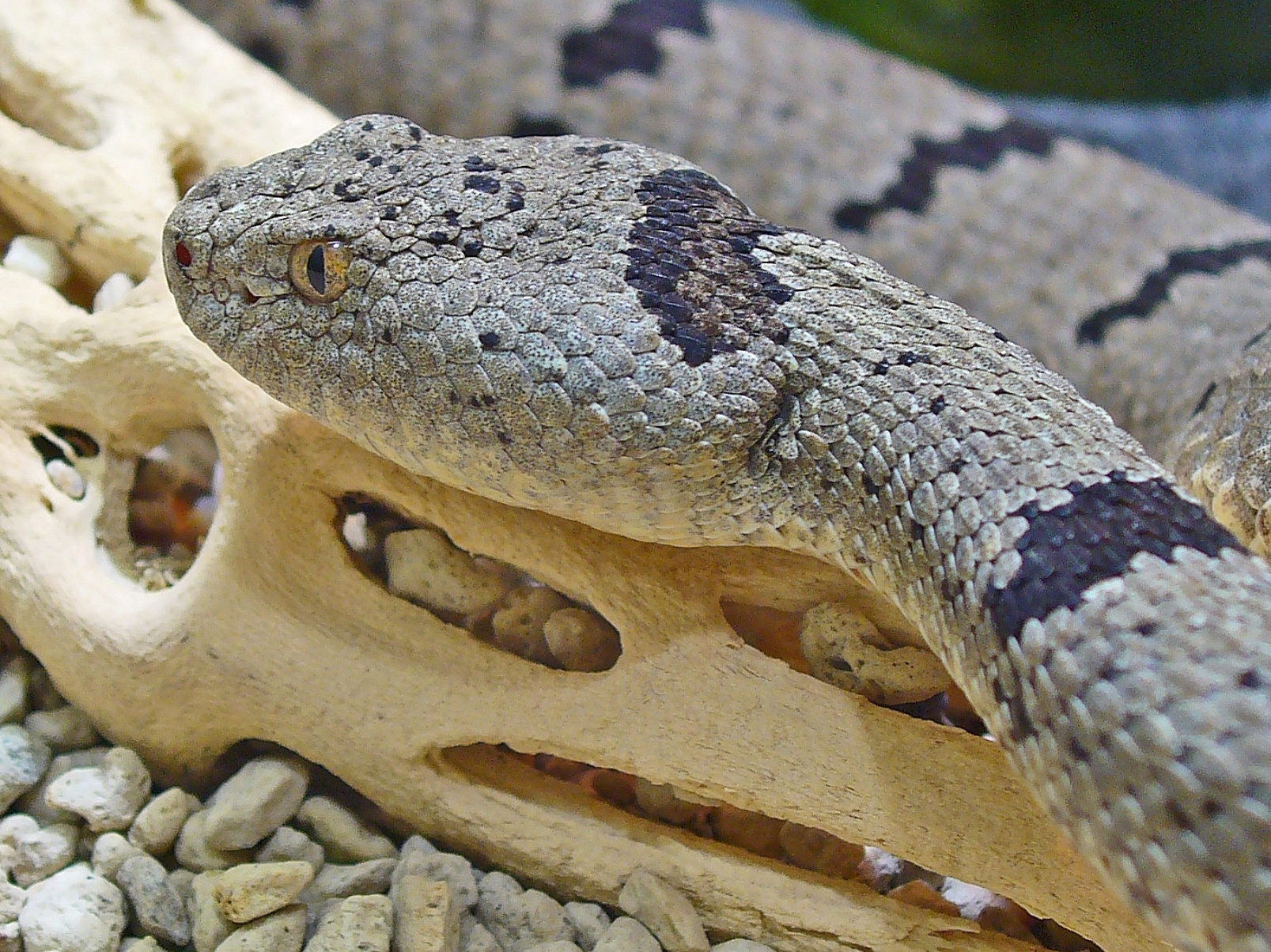
Crotalus lepidus klauberi

Adults rarely grow to more than 24 inches (61 cm) in total length (including tail). The color pattern is typically a light grey with darker grey banding that varies greatly from habitat to habitat. The background color may be green to purple in some locations. Those found in the Franklin Mountain range of El Paso County in Texas are unique, having a striking pearl silver background and well defined black crossbands.

The characters used to distinguish the various subspecies have been a point of contention for many years. Various sources have used scale counts, number of bands, the stripe along the eye region and the amount of mottling between bands as methods to tell them apart. Unfortunately, research has shown that there are always exceptions. It is generally accepted, however, that C. l. klauberi lacks mottling between the darker bands, even though this is not an entirely reliable method. It is not known whether the subspecies intergrade in the areas where their ranges overlap.

== Common names ==
Common names for C. lepidus klauberi include banded rock rattlesnake, blue rattlesnake, green rattlesnake, green rock rattlesnake, rock rattlesnake.

== Behavior ==
C. l. klauberi is a nocturnal, secretive snake. It spends most of its time hiding in rock crevices, and is often found in canyons, scree slopes, or man-made road cuts. Research has shown that it does not typically travel far, and often spends its entire life on one particular slope or ridge. Its diet consists of primarily lizards and rodents. It is a quite shy snake, often not even rattling if approached, relying instead on its camouflage to blend into the rocky habitat. It is most likely to be seen after a summer afternoon thunderstorm, or rain shower, when it comes out to bask and search for food.

In contrast to the shyness described above, banded rock rattlesnake specimens found high, above 7,000 ft (2,100 m), in the Organ Mountains of southern New Mexico are usually highly confident and defensive, rattling incessantly at the mere sight of humans. One often has to search carefully for the source of the rattling, because it is indeed expert at hiding itself in small caves and cracks in rocky terrain.

== Reproduction ==
C. l. klauberi is Ovoviviparous, with females giving birth to 2–8 young in the spring. Mating occurs in the summer months, after which gravid females hibernate during the winter months.
