= U&Eden =

British digital television channel

- Logo used since 2024
- Country: United Kingdom
- Broadcast area: UK and Ireland

Programming
- Language: English
- Picture format: 1080i HDTV (downscaled to 16:9 576i for the SDTV feed)
- Timeshift service: U&Eden +1

Ownership
- Owner: BBC Studios
- Parent: UKTV
- Sister channels: U&Alibi; U&Dave; U&Drama; U&Gold; U&W; U&Yesterday

History
- Launched: 8 March 2004; 22 years ago
- Replaced: UK Horizons
- Former names: UKTV Documentary (2004–2009); Eden (2009–2024)

Availability

Terrestrial
- Freeview: Channel 57

Streaming media
- Sky Go: Watch live (UK and Ireland only)

U&Eden is a British free-to-air television channel owned by UKTV, and broadcasts factual entertainment and drama programming. It originally launched on 8 March 2004 and relaunched in its current format on 27 January 2009. Eden was a pay television channel until 2024.

On 29 November 2023, UKTV announced its intention to launch 'U' – a new masterbrand that will unite its family channels and its streaming. Eden rebranded to U&Eden on 16 October 2024.

Launched on 16 July 2024, UKTV's streaming service UKTV Play became U; and its family of free-to-air channel adopted the "U&..." branding: U&Dave, U&Drama, U&W, and U&Yesterday.

On 16 August 2024, Ofcom gave UKTV a new broadcasting licence for U&Eden to become a free-to-air channel. U&Eden launched on Freeview on 16 October, replacing U&Yesterday+1.

Gold and Alibi rebranded to U&Gold and U&Alibi on 7 November 2024.

== History ==
Former logo, used prior to the U&Eden rebrand (2012–2024)

The UKTV channels were all rebranded on 8 March 2004. At the same time, Eden was launched as UKTV Documentary, showing factual documentaries, mainly from the BBC archives, on a variety of subjects if not covered by another channel in the UKTV network, such as Jacob Bronowski's The Ascent of Man. Much of this programming had come from the former UKTV channel UK Horizons, which had closed down the day before and which the channel, and spun off a sister channel called UKTV People. UKTV Documentary occupied the same broadcasting slot as UK Horizons.

On 9 October 2008, UKTV announced plans to rebrand UKTV Documentary and UKTV People in early 2009. The news came just two days after UKTV's entertainment channels were rebranded to Watch, Gold and Alibi. They announced that UKTV Documentary would be rebranded as Eden and this rebrand took place on 26 January 2009. As part of the rebrand, the channels programming output changed from all documentaries to primarily documentaries focusing on the natural environment. All other documentaries were transferred to UKTV History or UKTV People, depending on their subject matter.

In August 2024, it was reported that Eden had secured a licence to broadcast on Freeview, following the secure of a DTPS (Digital Television Programme Services) licence by Ofcom.

Eden was rebranded as U&Eden and launched on Freeview, Freesat and Freely on 16 October 2024. The channel effectively became free-to-air on 7 October 2024, when its encryption was dropped on satellite in preparation for its addition to Freesat.

== Subsidiary channels ==
=== U&Eden +1 ===
From launch, the channel has had a timeshift service, called Eden +1 and UKTV Documentary +1 before it. The service ran on Sky and Virgin Media and broadcast the channels schedule one hour later than usual. The timeshift was removed from Virgin Media in October 2008 to allow bandwidth for new channel Watch, however the timeshift service was restored on 7 October 2011.

=== U&Eden HD ===
Eden HD launched on 4 October 2010 on Sky channel 559, running a high-definition simulcast of the main channel. As part of Virgin Media's deal to sell its share of UKTV, all five of UKTV's HD channels were added to Virgin's cable television service by 2012. Eden HD was added to Virgin Media on 7 October 2011. On 3 October 2016, Eden HD was added to BT. On 2 October 2017, Eden HD was removed from the Sky lineup and replaced with Gold HD.

== On-air identity ==
The UKTV Documentary identity focused around scenes from the landscape of Britain. The ident would first feature a close up shot, for example of a person or a stone, before pulling back to reveal the bigger picture: such as a busy rail station or a stone circle. This was then overlaid with the UKTV Documentary logo, consisting of the UKTV logo on top, and an upper case 'DOCUMENTARY' tag below, aligned to the left of the screen. Alongside the idents, the channel had a digital on-screen graphic (DOG) of the same design and also featured a generic UKTV design for all promotions for the channel. The channels house colour was a blue, similar in shade to Azure, and would feature in numerous changing shades on the end boards of promotions.

The 2009–2024 Eden identity featured explorers in an unknown environment, such as the deep jungle or the Antarctic, before coming across a landscape, which the logo then forms onto.

The 2024 identity films introduced in the rebrand to U&Eden utilise aerial photography, similarly to those of Sky Mix.

== Programming ==
Logo without circle (2009–2024)

The programming used on the original pay-TV Eden channel was mostly from the BBC archives, and so was therefore edited to fit the time slot: an original broadcast for an hour-long programme on the BBC might be as much as 58 minutes long, while the same programme here might be 42 minutes long without the commercials. Eden was renowned for showing blue-chip natural history but then moved into more scientific programmes, while keeping the blue-chip, cinematic identity. Eden has also produced its own exclusive programming, with the most recent series David Attenborough's Natural Curiosities, produced by Humble Bee Films, broadcasting from January 2013.

=== Programmes on U&Eden ===
From January 2024, Eden began to show a wider range of programming and now airs a range of reality, gameshows, drama and history programming from U&W, U&Drama, U&Dave and U&Yesterday, and since early 2025, nature programming was no longer aired on the channel but by the start of 2026, some natural history programming had returned.

Name of show	Original channel(s)	Original run
10 Things You Didn't Know About...	BBC Four	2007–2008
Africa	BBC One	2013
An African Journey with Jonathan Dimbleby	BBC Two	2010
Animal Armageddon	Animal Planet (United States)	2009
Amazing Planet	National Geographic Channel (United States)	2007
Amazon	BBC Two	2008
Arctic with Bruce Parry	BBC Two	2011
Are We Changing Planet Earth?	BBC One	2006
Ask Attenborough	Eden	2011
Attenborough and the Giant Egg	BBC Two	2011
Attenborough's Paradise Birds	BBC Two	2015
Australia: The Time Travellers Guide	ABC1 (Australia)	2012
The Ballad of Big Al	BBC One	2000
BBC Wildlife Specials	BBC One	1995–present
The Bear Family & Me	BBC Two	2011
Bahama Blue	Animal Planet	2015
Bang Goes the Theory	BBC One	2009–2014
Biggest and Baddest with Niall McCann	Animal Planet	2012–2014
Blood and Guts: A History of Surgery	BBC Four	2008
The Blue Planet	BBC One	2001
The Brain: A Secret History	BBC Four	2011
Charles Darwin and the Tree of Life	BBC One	2009
Chased by Dinosaurs	BBC One	2002
The Code	BBC Two	2011
David Attenborough's Natural Curiosities	Eden; W	2013–2017
Deadly 60	CBBC	2014–2017
Death of a Sea Monster	National Geographic Channel (United States)	2011
Deserts and Life	Eden	2012
Dino Stampede	BBC Two	2011
Do We Really Need the Moon?	BBC Two	2011
Earthflight	BBC One	2011–2012
Earth: The Power of the Planet	BBC Two	2007
Eden Shorts: From Lens to Screen	Eden	2015
Equator	BBC Two	2006
Expedition Borneo	BBC One	2007
Favourite Attenborough Moments	UKTV Documentary	2006
First Life	BBC Two	2010
Forecasting the End	The Weather Channel	2013
Frozen Planet	BBC One	2011
Galápagos	BBC Two	2006
Ganges	BBC Two	2007
Great Barrier Reef	BBC Two	2012
The Great Rift: Africa's Wild Heart	BBC Two	2010
Hainan Adventure with Nigel Marven	Eden	2012
Himalaya with Michael Palin	BBC One	2004
Horizon	BBC Two	1964–present
How to Grow a Planet	BBC Two	2012
Human Planet (Note: The re-runs was withdrawn in 2020 after the BBC admits the breaching of its own editorial guidelines in 2018.)	BBC One	2011
Humpbacks: From Fire to Ice	ABC1 (Australia)	2008
The Incredible Human Journey	BBC Two	2009
Inside Nature's Giants	Channel 4	2009–2012
Inside the Human Body	BBC One	2011
James May's Things You Need To Know	BBC Two	2011–2012
Killer Whale Islands with Nigel Marven	Channel 5	2007
Killer Whales: Beneath the Surface	BBC Two	2013
Last Chance to See	BBC Two	2009
Life in Cold Blood	BBC One	2008
Life in the Freezer	BBC One	1993
Life in the Undergrowth	BBC One	2005
The Life of Birds	BBC One	1998
The Life of Mammals	BBC One	2002–2003
Life on Earth	BBC Two	1979
Life on Fire	Arte (France)	2009–2010
Life	BBC One	2009
Lion Country	ITV	2010–2011
The Living Planet	BBC One	1984
Lost Land of the Jaguar	BBC One	2008
Lost Land of the Tiger	BBC One	2010
Lost Land of the Volcano	BBC One	2009
Madagascar	BBC Two	2011
Monsters We Met	BBC Two	2004
Monster Bug Wars	Science (United States)	2011–2012
Mountain Gorilla	BBC Two	2010
Museum of Life	BBC Two	2010
Natural World	BBC Two	1983–2020
Nature's Great Events	BBC One	2009
Nature	PBS (United States)	1982–present
Nigel Marven's Rhino Adventure	Channel 5	2006
Nova	PBS (United States)	1974–present
Oceans	BBC Two	2008
Ocean Giants	BBC Two	2011
On Thin Ice	BBC Two	2009
Orbit: Earth's Extraordinary Journey	BBC Two	2012
Origins of Us	BBC Two	2011
Planet Dinosaur	BBC One	2011
Planet Earth	BBC One	2006
The Polar Bear Family & Me	BBC Two	2013
The Private Life of Plants	BBC One	1995
Ray Mears' Bushcraft	BBC Two	2004–2005
Ray Mears Goes Walkabout	BBC Two	2008
Ray Mears' Northern Wilderness	BBC Two	2009
Reconstructing T-Rex	National Geographic Channel (United States)	2010
Richard Hammond's Invisible Worlds	BBC One	2010
Sea Monsters	BBC One	2003
The Secrets of Everything	BBC Three	2012
South Pacific	BBC Two	2009
The Story of Science: Power, Proof and Passion	BBC Two	2010
Super Giant Animals	BBC One	2013
Swarm: Nature's Incredible Invasions	BBC One	2009
Ten Deadliest Snakes: China	Animal Planet; Eden	2013
Ten Deadliest Snakes with Nigel Marven	Animal Planet; Eden	2013–2017
Termites - The Inner Sanctum	ORF (Austria)	2011
Through Hell and High Water	BBC One; BBC Two	2006
The Trials of Life	BBC One	1990
Tribal Wives	BBC Two	2008–2010
Tribe	BBC Two	2005–2007
Tropic of Cancer	BBC Two	2010
Uncovering Our Earliest Ancestor: The Link	BBC One	2009
Voyage of the Continents	Arte (France)	2012
Walking with Beasts	BBC One	2001
Walking with Dinosaurs	BBC One	1999
Walking with Monsters	BBC One	2005
Whale Adventure with Nigel Marven	Channel 5 Eden	2013
Wild Arabia	BBC Two	2013
Wild Brazil	BBC Two	2014
Wild Britain with Ray Mears	ITV; Eden	2010–2013
Wild Canada	CBC (Canada)	2014
Wild Caribbean	BBC Two	2007
Wild China	BBC Two	2008
Wild Colombia with Nigel Marven	Eden	2012
Wild Down Under	BBC Two	2003
Wonders of the Solar System	BBC Two	2010
Wonders of the Universe	BBC Two	2011
Yellowstone	BBC Two	2009
Yunnan Adventure with Nigel Marven	Eden	2012

=== U&Eden programming ===
U&Eden launched as a rebranded free-to-air service on Freeview on 16 October 2024, with its programmes, usually scheduled in multi-episode blocks, now including:

- Abandoned Engineering
- Anthony Bourdain: Parts Unknown (repeats started from season 12 on 16 October 2024)
- The Architecture the Railways Built
- Bargain Hunt
- The Bill
- Campion
- Celebrity Mastermind
- Cutting It
- David Attenborough's Natural Curiosities
- Doctor Who
- Doctor Who: Terror of the Autons
- Doctor Who: The Claws of Axos
- Doctor Who: The Mutants
- Dr Christian: 12 Hours to Cure Your Street
- Expedition with Steve Backshall
- Hornby: A Model World
- Impossible Engineering
- Inside the Ambulance
- The Missing
- Mistresses
- The Onedin Line
- Parkinson
- Pointless
- Red Dwarf
- Secret Army
- Sorry!
- Steam Train Britain
- The Two Ronnies
- Top of the Pops
- Warbird Workshop

== See also ==
- UKTV
- Television in the United Kingdom
