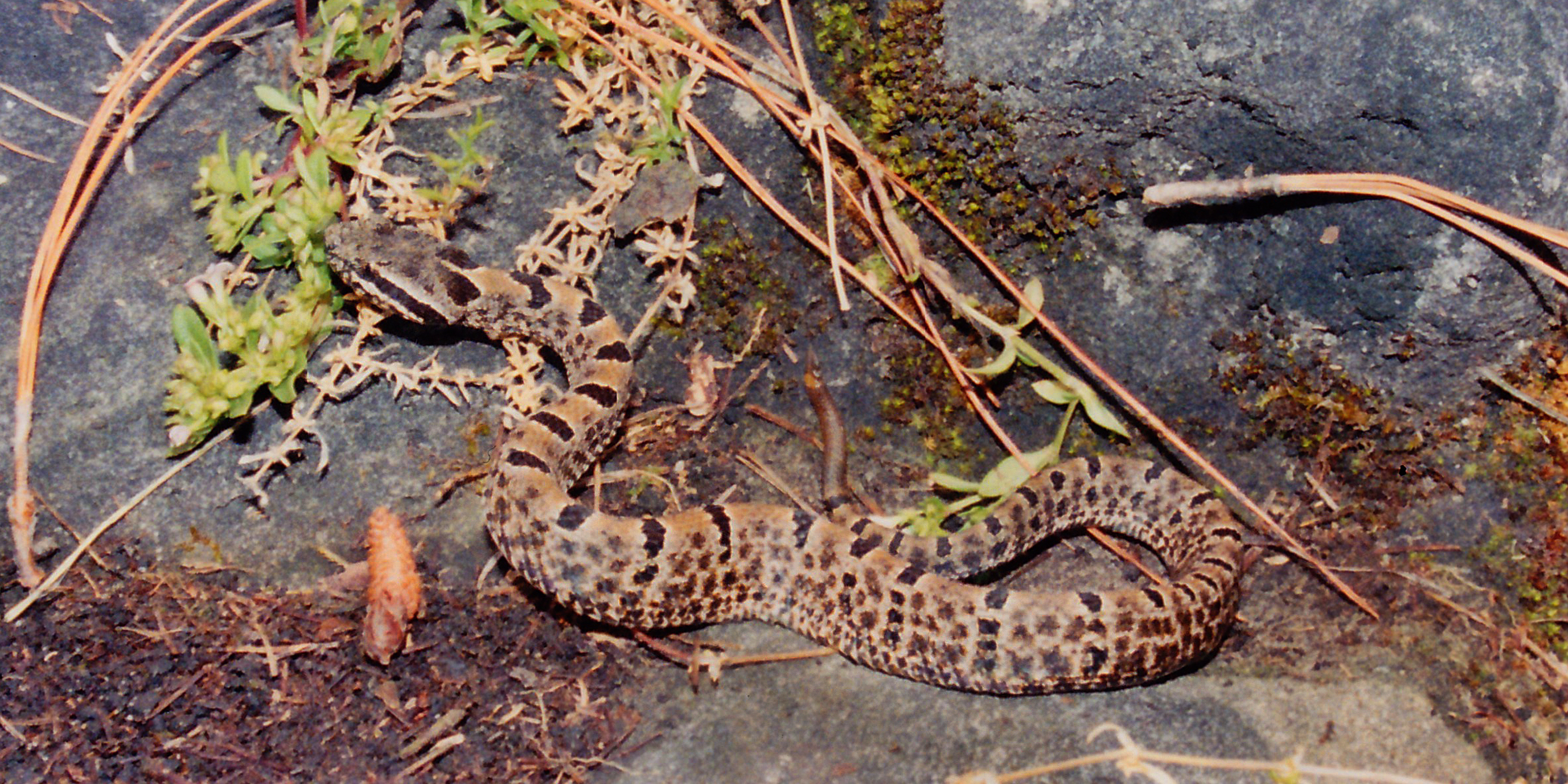

Scientific classification
- Kingdom: Animalia
- Phylum: Chordata
- Class: Reptilia
- Order: Squamata
- Suborder: Serpentes
- Family: Viperidae
- Genus: Crotalus
- Species: C. morulus

Binomial name
- Crotalus morulus Klauber, 1952

Synonyms
- Crotalus lepidus subsp. morulus Klauber, 1952

= Crotalus morulus =

Species of snake

Crotalus morulus, or the Tamaulipan rock rattlesnake, is a species of rattlesnake from Mexico, closely related to and previously considered a subspecies of Crotalus lepidus. The name morulus comes from the Latin word morus for mulberry in reference to their mottled patterns. As with all rattlesnakes, it is venomous.

== Description ==
As juveniles, Crotalus morulus has a dark pattern with black blotches dorsally on a grey base, the dark colours blending between the patterns. Adults are also grey with dark-brown blotches. They are distinguished from Crotalus lepidus by this dark colouration and higher number of blotches.

Their rattle is also known to be fluorescent, although more dull in adults than neonates.

== Reproduction ==
Crotalus morulus is known to be ovoviviparous.

== Venom ==
The hemotoxic and neurotoxic venom of C. morulus has been shown to contain a disintegrin known as morulustatin, which inhibits certain biological functions such as platelet aggregation.
