= Ehsan Masood =

British science writer, journalist and broadcaster

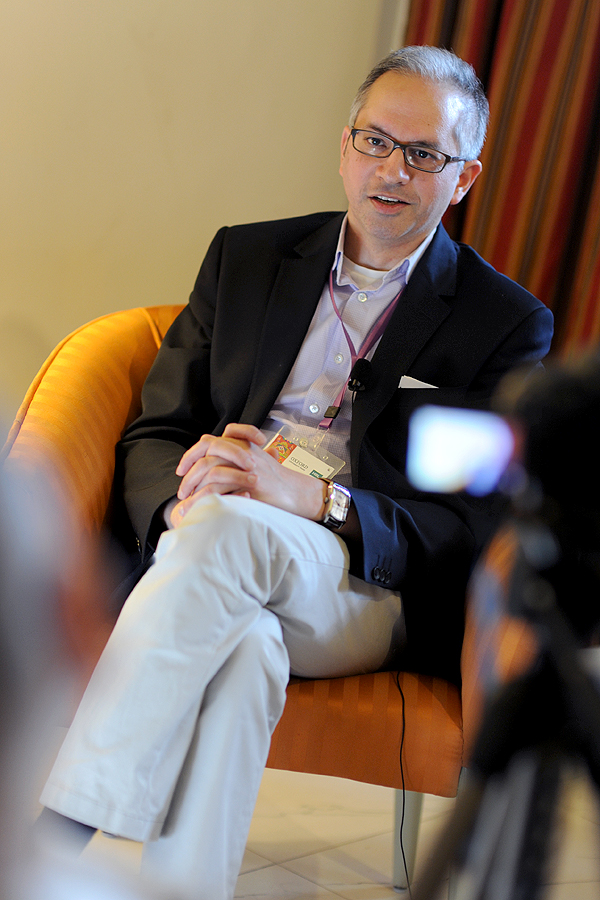
- Born: 9 August 1967 (age 59)
- Education: Portsmouth University; Birkbeck, University of London
- Children: 1
- Scientific career
- Workplaces: Research Professional; Imperial College London; Nature; New Scientist; BBC
- Website: twitter.com/EhsanMasood

Hassan Ehsan Masood (born 9 August 1967) is a British science writer, journalist and broadcaster. Between 2009 and 2017 he was the editor of Research Fortnight (part of Research Professional News), is currently bureau chief (editorials, Africa and the Middle East) at Nature, and has been teaching international science policy at Imperial College London. since 2008.

== Biography ==
Born in London, his father Hassan Masood worked in actuarial science and his mother Shamsa Masood is a writer of short fiction in Urdu.

He went to schools in New York, Karachi and London; studied applied physics at Portsmouth Polytechnic and science communication at Birkbeck, University of London.

He worked for the journal Nature as a writer on science and international development from 1995 to 1999 and again as acting chief commissioning editor in 2008/2009. He has also worked as Opinion Editor of New Scientist and communications director at LEAD International.

Masood has also written for Prospect magazine and openDemocracy.net, as well as The Times, The Guardian and Le Monde. He is a former director of communications of Leadership for Environment and Development and also advises the British Council on science and on cultural relations.

Ehsan Masood was a regular contributor to Home Planet, an environmental affairs programme on BBC Radio 4 in the UK.

== Awards and nominations ==
In January 2015, Masood was nominated for Services to Science and Engineering at the British Muslim Awards.

In February 2023, Masood won Inclusive Mosque Initiative's Workplace Ally of the Year Award.

== Selected publications ==
His latest book is The Great Invention: The Story of GDP and the Making and Unmaking of the Modern World, which will be published in the US on 7 June 2016 by Pegasus.

Ehsan Masood's previous book is Science and Islam: A History. This tells the story of how science developed during Islam's imperial period from 800 to 1500. It is the official tie-in to a three-part documentary series on BBC Television presented by Jim Al-Khalili, Professor of Physics at the University of Surrey.

His other publications include:

- Our Shared Europe This is a report for a major new British Council programme of activities aimed at reducing mistrust between non-Muslim and Muslim communities.
- Dry: Life Without Water, Cambridge, Mass: Harvard University Press 2006 ISBN 0-674-02224-6 (editor with Daniel Schaffer)
- How Do You Know? Reading Ziauddin Sardar on Islam, Science and Cultural Relations, London: Pluto Press 2006 ISBN 0-7453-2514-9 (editor)
- British Muslims: Media Guide, published by the British Council in association with the Association of Muslim Social Scientists, 2006. Download a copy of British Muslims: Media Guide here
- The GM Debate: Who Decides? Analysing Decision-making on Genetically Modified Crops in Developing Countries, London: Panos 2005

== In the media ==
- In February 2009, Ehsan Masood presented a three-part series for BBC Radio 4 entitled Islam and Science
- Ehsan Masood is a regular panellist on BBC Radio 4's environmental affairs programme Home Planet
- Islam's reformers, Prospect article by Ehsan Masood republished on Wanabehuman.
- Science, Development, Faith Ehsan's Open Democracy columns
- Islam and Science Special issue of Nature, November 2006
- Ehsan Masood talks about Dry: Life Without Water on Start the Week on BBC Radio 4, 29 May 2006
- Televised discussion on climate security at Carleton University, Canada with John Ashton, Simon Dalby and hosted by Ken Rockburn of CPAC's Talk Politics show, February 2007
