= Jellyfish Pictures =

Film and television production company

- Type: Subsidiary
- Industry: Visual effects, Computer-generated imagery, Feature animation
- Founded: 2001; 25 years ago
- Founder: Phil Dobree
- Defunct: 11 March 2025; 16 months ago
- Fate: Insolvent and entered administration
- Successor: JFX
- Headquarters: England
- Number of locations: 4
- Area served: London, Toronto, Sheffield
- Key people: David Patton (CEO); Mark Warburg (COO); Dave Wickman (CFO); Archie Donato (MD, Animation); Natalie Llewellyn (MD, Jellyfish Originals); Phil Greenlow (MD, VFX); Luke Dodd (Director of VFX & Animation)
- Members: 500+ (as of Aug 2023)
- Divisions: Jellyfish Originals, Animation, VFX
- Website: jellyfishpictures.com (now redirects to JFX)

Jellyfish Pictures was a British VFX and animation company specialising in the creation of digital visual effects and animation.

== History ==
The company was founded in 2001 by Philip Dobree and Will Rockall, with a team of three artists and one producer, moving to their first studio in Soho, Central London in Poland Street in 2003. In 2005, they started their first long form TV series The Story of One, following this with work on the BBC series Fight For Life in 2007, for which they won multiple industry awards including a BAFTA, RTS and VES award for 'Outstanding Visual Effects. Over the next few years they continued to expand, working on the long form CGI series Planet Dinosaur for the BBC and Discovery Channel in 2011, followed by multiple nominations and wins for their work on Inside the Human Body in 2012. In 2017, Jellyfish Pictures launched its own original content division, Jellyfish Originals - focused on the development, distribution, rights management, financing and commercialisation of original animated properties.

Jellyfish Pictures has undergone rapid growth in recent years as the studio joined Key Capital Partners over a minority investment, expediting the global scaling of their VFX and animation teams, and advance the development and production of its original kids and family content through Jellyfish Originals. David Patton joined Jellyfish Pictures as CEO in December 2022 while Mark Warburg joined as COO. The on-location studio locations have also expanded significantly, with a studio division opening in Sheffield in 2020 (overseen by animation director Kevin Spruce), and a new Mumbai studio recently opening in 2023. Operations in Canada were announced in June 2024.

On 11 March 2025, Jellyfish Pictures suspended its operations because of rising costs stemming from the COVID-19 pandemic, the 2023 SAG-AFTRA strike and others, and announced it was exploring options for sale and investments. Its studio in Mumbai would also be closed with the London studio being on sale.

In June 2025, a new company, JFX (short for Jellyfish FX) was launched by Troubadour Studios.

== Production ==
=== TV series ===
Title	Release date	Studio(s)	Ref(s)	Notes
The Story of 1	2005	BBC		Documentary
Fight for Life	9 July 2007	BBC One		TV series Documentary; 2008 winner Bafta special effects prize
Planet Dinosaur	14 September 2011	BBC; Discovery Channel; ZDF		TV animated series Documentary
Doctor Who	23 November 2013	BBC One; BBC Wales		TV series Day of the Doctor Special; Additional VFX
Your Inner Fish	2014	Tangled Bank Studios; PBS		TV animated series Documentary
Floogals	15 January 2016-22 March 2020	Nevision Studios; Zodiak Kids Studios		TV animated series
Black Mirror	October 2016	Netflix; House of Tomorrow; Endemol Shine UK		TV series Hated in the Nation only
Dennis & Gnasher: Unleashed!	6 November 2017	Beano Studios; CBBC		TV animated series
Bitz & Bob	12 March 2018	BBC Children's Productions; FremantleMedia Kids & Family; Boat Rocker Rights		TV animated series
The Innocents	24 August 2018	Netflix; New Pictures		TV series
Watchmen	20 October 2019	HBO; White Rabbit; Paramount Television; DC Entertainment; Warner Bros. Television		TV series Limited
How to Train Your Dragon: Homecoming	3 December 2019	DreamWorks Animation; NBCUniversal		TV animated special Production services
Gangs of London	23 April 2020	Sky Atlantic; Pulse Films; Sister Pictures; Sky Studios		TV series Series finale only
White Lines	15 May 2020	Netflix; Left Bank Pictures; Vancouver Media; Sony Pictures Television		TV series
Hanna	3 July 2020	NBCUniversal International Studios; Tomorrow Studios; Working Title Television; Focus Features; Amazon Studios		TV series Season 2 only
Sex Education	17 September 2021	Netflix; Eleven Film		TV series Season 3 only
The Book of Boba Fett	29 December 2021	Disney+ Lucasfilm		TV miniseries
This Is Going to Hurt	8 February 2022	Sister Pictures; Terrible Productions; AMC Studios; BBC		Miniseries
The Baby	24 April 2022	HBO; Sister Pictures; Sky Studios; Proverbial Pictures		TV series
Prehistoric Planet	23 May 2022	Apple TV+ BBC		Documentary; Concept art only VFX by Moving Picture Company
Stranger Things	27 May 2022	Netflix; 21 Laps Entertainment; Monkey Massacre		TV series Season 4 only

=== Films ===
==== Live Action VFX ====
Title	Release date	Studio(s)	Ref(s)	Notes
Kingsman: The Secret Service	13 February 2015	20th Century Fox; Marv Studios; Cloudy Productions		With Prime Focus World, Baseblack, Panton Creative, Doc & A Soc, Peerless Camera Company and BUF
Rogue One: A Star Wars Story	16 December 2016	Lucasfilm Ltd.		Main VFX from Industrial Light & Magic; Additional VFX with Ubisoft Hybride, Ghost VFX, Whiskytree, Atomic Fiction, Scanline VFX, and Raynault VFX.
Star Wars: The Last Jedi	15 December 2017	Lucasfilm Ltd.		Main VFX from Industrial Light & Magic; Additional VFX with Ubisoft Hybride, One of Us, Base FX, Rodeo FX, Ghost VFX, Virutos, Animatrik Film Design, Exceptional Minds, Important Looking Pirates, and Yannix.
Solo: A Star Wars Story	25 May 2018	Lucasfilm Ltd.		Main VFX from Industrial Light & Magic; Additional VFX with Ubisoft Hybride, Raynault VFX, Tippet Studio, Exceptional Minds, Virutos and Lola/VFX
Captive State	15 March 2019	Focus Features; Participant Media		
Fear Street Part One: 1994	2 July 2021	Netflix; Chernin Entertainment		Uncredited
Fear Street Part Two: 1978	9 July 2021	Netflix; Chernin Entertainment		Uncredited
Fear Street Part Three: 1666	16 July 2021	Netflix; Chernin Entertainment		Uncredited
Roald Dahl's Matilda the Musical	2 December 2022	Netflix; TriStar Pictures; Working Title Films; The Roald Dahl Story Company		

==== Animation ====
Title	Release date	Studio(s)	Ref(s)	Notes
Trolls World Tour	10 April 2020	Universal Pictures; DreamWorks Animation		Marketing custom animation services (with Minimo VFX)
Spirit Untamed	4 June 2021	Universal Pictures; DreamWorks Animation		Production services Additional animation services by 88 Pictures
The Boss Baby: Family Business	2 July 2021	Universal Pictures; DreamWorks Animation		Asset production services
The Bad Guys	22 April 2022	Universal Pictures; DreamWorks Animation		Additional asset production services
Kung Fu Panda 4	8 March 2024	Universal Pictures; DreamWorks Animation		Additional asset production services
Dog Man	31 January 2025	Universal Pictures; DreamWorks Animation		Production services (last films)
The Twits	17 October 2025	Netflix Animation Studios; The Roald Dahl Story Company		Production services (last films)

== Accolades ==
=== Annie Awards ===
Year	Film	Category	Recipient(s)	Result
2020	How to Train Your Dragon: Homecoming	Best Animated Special Production	DreamWorks Animation	Won
2020	How to Train Your Dragon: Homecoming	Outstanding Achievement for Animated Effects in an Animated Television / Broadcast Production	Manuel Reyes Halaby, Cristiana Covone, Koya Masubuchi, Jean Claude Nouchy, Dustin Henning	Nominated
2020	How to Train Your Dragon: Homecoming	Outstanding Achievement for Character Animation in an Animated Television / Broadcast Production	Andrew Muir	Nominated
2022	Spirit Untamed	Best Storyboarding	Gary Graham	Nominated
