= Nigel Paterson (producer) =

British television producer

- Years active: 2001-present

Nigel Paterson is a Primetime Emmy Award-winning British television writer, director, and producer.

== Biography ==
Paterson began his career at the BBC as part of the production team on the 2001 series Walking with Beasts for which he shared the 2002 Primetime Emmy Award for Animated Program – More Than One Hour.

He co-wrote and co-directed the 2006 series Nuremberg: Nazis on Trial that re-enacted the Nuremberg Trials of prominent Nazi war criminals.

He directed and produced the 2007 Wolof Wrestling episode of the series Last Man Standing.

== Filmography ==
- 2001 Walking with Beasts producer & director
- 2001 Triumph of the Beasts & The Beasts Within producer
- 2002 Human Instinct director
- 2003 Human Senses director
- 2004 Meet the Ancestors: The Hunt for Darwin's Beagle director
- 2004 Bermuda Triangle: Beneath the Waves director
- 2005 The Truth About Killer Dinosaurs director
- 2005 Horizon/Nova: The Ghost in Your Genes producer & director
- 2006 Nuremberg: Nazis on Trial director & writer
- 2007 Last Man Standing: Wolof Wrestling producer & director
- 2008 In Search of Medieval Britain producer
- 2008 James May's Big Ideas producer
- 2011 Planet Dinosaur producer & director
- 2016 The Beginning and End of the Universe producer & director
