= Planet Dinosaur =

2011 six-part documentary television series

- Title card
- Genre: Documentary
- Created by: Nigel Paterson; Phil Dobree
- Written by: Nigel Paterson; Tom Brass
- Directed by: Nigel Paterson
- Creative director: Phil Dobree
- Narrated by: John Hurt
- Composer: Ilan Eshkeri
- Country of origin: United Kingdom
- Original language: English
- No. of episodes: 6

Production
- Executive producer: Andrew Cohen
- Editor: Andy Walter
- Running time: 30 minutes
- Production companies: Jellyfish Pictures; BBC; Discovery Channel; ZDF

Original release
- Network: BBC One, BBC One HD, BBC HD
- Release: 14 September – 19 October 2011

Planet Dinosaur, is a six-part documentary television series created by Nigel Paterson and Phil Dobree, produced by the BBC, and narrated by John Hurt. It first aired in the United Kingdom in 2011, with VFX studio Jellyfish Pictures as its producer. It was the first major dinosaur-related series for BBC One since Walking with Dinosaurs. There are more than 50 different prehistoric species featured, and they and their environments were created entirely as computer-generated images, for around a third of the production cost that was needed a decade earlier for Walking with Dinosaurs. Much of the series' plot is based on scientific discoveries made since Walking with Dinosaurs, with episodes frequently stopping the action to show fossil evidence and the assumptions based on them. The companion book to Planet Dinosaur was released on 8 September 2011, and the DVD and Blu-ray were released on 24 October 2011. Planet Dinosaur is highly praised for its stunning graphics and 3D animation. The series was also accompanied by an online video game which has since become inaccessible.

== List of episodes ==
No.	Title	Era	Directed by	Written by	Original release date	UK viewers (millions)
1	"Lost World"	95 mya	Nigel Paterson	Nigel Paterson & Tom Brass	14 September 2011	4.74
95 million years ago, Late Cretaceous (Egypt, North Africa) In a swamp in North Africa a herd of Ouranosaurus are spooked by a Spinosaurus, which ignores them. Instead, it hunts Onchopristis (a giant sawfish), which are migrating into freshwater rivers to breed. A Rugops watching nearby scavenges its leftovers. The episode cuts to a pair of young male Carcharodontosaurus, which are fighting to gain rights to hunt a herd of Ouranosaurus. The victor then hunts and kills one of the herbivores. The episode then cuts to the habitat of Spinosaurus during the dry season, where a drought is taking place. Spinosaurus competes for the remaining water and fish with a Sarcosuchus, which unlike dinosaurs can hibernate during droughts. When Sarcosuchus refuses to be intimidated, Spinosaurus is forced to hunt on land. After killing and eating a pterosaur, it comes across a group of Ouranosaurus. Catching the scent of a kill, it discovers a Carcharodontosaurus, which has brought down one of the Ouranosaurus. After a fight over the carcass, the Spinosaurus drives off the Carcharodontosaurus, although it is left with bite marks in its sail. It then journeys into the desert, taking a rest as the injuries weaken it. The narrator then explains that a million years later, rising sea levels destroyed the Spinosaurus's habitat, ultimately dooming the species; the last scene shows the Spinosaurus lying lifeless in the desert having succumbed to its injuries, representing the species' extinction. Species: Ouranosaurus; Spinosaurus; Onchopristis; Rugops; Carcharodontosaurus; Sarcosuchus; Alanqa (unidentified); Aegyptosuchus (unidentified); Referenced species: Tyrannosaurus; Irritator; Baryonyx; Siamosaurus; Allosaurus; Aerosteon; Iguanodon
2	"Feathered Dragons"	154 / 85 / 120 mya	Nigel Paterson	Nigel Paterson	21 September 2011	Unknown
154 million years ago, Late Jurassic (Beijing, China, Asia); 85 million years ago, Late Cretaceous (Mongolia, Asia); 125 million years ago, Early Cretaceous (Jilin, China, Asia) In a late Jurassic forest in what is now China, an Epidexipteryx escapes from a juvenile Sinraptor by climbing a tree. It finds a beetle larva in the tree bark. This shows the species as being one that uses its elongated fingers in a similar way that a modern day aye-aye uses its fingers. However, another, larger Epidexipteryx steals its prey, and after a brief bout of posturing, the smaller individual goes to find more food. It drops a second grub to the forest floor, where the larger Epidexipteryx retrieves it, only for the juvenile Sinraptor to kill it. The episode then cuts to a desert in late Cretaceous Mongolia, where a Saurornithoides is shown brooding a nest of eggs. When it leaves the nest, an Oviraptor raids it, eating one egg before fleeing with another when the troodontid returns. A Gigantoraptor suddenly attacks and eats the Saurornithoides. The Gigantoraptor then heads to compete in a breeding ritual for mates. The males use their feathers for display, a brief fight between two erupting at one point, allowing the females to choose the best suitor. The episode finally cuts to an early Cretaceous forest in China, where a Xianglong is being hunted by a Microraptor, which uses its feathers to pursue the gliding lizard in the air. A Sinornithosaurus attacks it, and after a brief chase the Microraptor manages a lucky escape. The Sinornithosaurus, alongside two other members of its species, is then shown hunting a Jeholosaurus and its three young. The group brings down the parent, the narrator explaining that their possibly venomous bite allowed them to tackle animals much larger than themselves. A montage is then shown of the feathered dinosaurs featured in the programme, with the narrator saying that "Microraptor not only hints at how flight "might have" developed, but also that dinosaurs still live amongst us today... as birds". Species: Epidexipteryx; Unidentified beetle larvae; Sinraptor; Saurornithoides; Oviraptor (identified as "oviraptorid"); Gigantoraptor; Xianglong; Microraptor; Sinornithosaurus; Jeholosaurus; Referenced species: Sinosauropteryx; Anchiornis; Caudipteryx; Troodon; Beipiaosaurus; Tianyuraptor; Velociraptor
3	"Last Killers"	75 / 70 mya	Nigel Paterson	Nigel Paterson	28 September 2011	3.97
75 million years ago, Late Cretaceous (Alberta, North America); 75 million years ago, Late Cretaceous (Alaska, North America); 70 million years ago, Late Cretaceous (Madagascar, Africa) In late Cretaceous Canada, in what will be known as Dinosaur Provincial Park, a Daspletosaurus stalks a Chasmosaurus in a forest but loses the element of surprise and is forced to retreat. The Chasmosaurus comes across a younger Daspletosaurus, before a group of the tyrannosaurids ambush it. The episode then cuts to the high Arctic, where a large species of Troodon hunts Edmontosaurus. The theropods attack at night, separating a juvenile from the herd and severely wounding it, only for an adult to drive them away. In the morning, they return to eat the carcass of the juvenile, which died during the night. The episode returns to the Daspletosaurus, who chase and bring down the Chasmosaurus. The larger adults bully the youngsters off the carcass, forcing them to wait until they have finished. The episode then cuts to Madagascar, where a mother Majungasaurus -an abelisaurid- and her two offspring chase a group of Rahonavis off a Rapetosaurus carcass. However, a male Majungasaurus temporarily drives them off. But, after he steals some food from one of the young, the female attacks him. And then, she kills him, before she and her young cannibalise his body. The episode returns once again to North America, where the Daspletosaurus are waiting for the annual migration of Centrosaurus. They attack during a rainstorm, killing some of the ceratopsians. The Centrosaurus make it to a flooded river and begin to swim across, and although many make it to the other side, some drown due to being caught by giant crocodilians or severely wounded by floating debris. The rest of the Centrosaurus drown for unseen reasons. In the morning, the carcasses of rotting flesh attract scavengers, including the Daspletosaurus. A montage is then shown of Daspletosaurus and Majungasaurus, the narrator saying that "together, the tyrannosaurids and abelisaurids were the last of the killer dinosaurs." Species: Daspletosaurus; Chasmosaurus; Edmontosaurus; Troodon (Alaskan Species); Majungasaurus; Rahonavis; Rapetosaurus (carcass); Centrosaurus; Deinosuchus (unidentified); Referenced species: Gorgosaurus; Tarbosaurus; Tyrannosaurus; Albertosaurus; Psittacosaurus; Raptorex; Protoceratops; Alectrosaurus; Triceratops; Mojoceratops; Styracosaurus; Alioramus
4	"Fight for Life"	150 mya	Nigel Paterson	Nigel Paterson & Tom Brass	5 October 2011	Unknown
150 million years ago, Late Jurassic (Svalbard, Europe) 150 million years ago, Late Jurassic (Oklahoma, USA, North America) In the seas of late Jurassic Europe, Kimmerosaurus hunt Squatina. Pliosaurus funkei ambushes them, but they manage to escape to water too shallow for the enormous pliosaur. The episode then cuts to North America, where Stegosaurus and Camptosaurus coexist in a mutually beneficial relationship: the Camptosaurus serve as lookouts, while Stegosaurus provide protection. An Allosaurus attacks the group, and after the Camptosaurus flee, attacks the Stegosaurus, but in the end a Stegosaurus' thagomizer spiked tail severely wounds it. However, the Allosaurus survives and recovers from the injury. The episode returns to the Jurassic seas, where the tide has risen, allowing Pliosaurus to attack the Kimmerosaurus, but it is unable to use its full power in the shallow water, allowing the agile plesiosaurs to escape. However, they must eventually return to deeper water to feed. The episode returns to North America, where another Allosaurus is hunting a pair of Camptosaurus, who are away from the protection of Stegosaurus. The theropod manages to bring down one of the Camptosaurus, only for a Saurophaganax to chase it off its kill. The episode returns again to the seas around Europe, where a Kimmerosaurus is feeding near the surface in deeper water. It is attacked from below by Pliosaurus, which finally manages to kill the plesiosaur, leaving half of it to sink to the seafloor. The episode ends with the narrator stating that in the battle for survival, the odds are always stacked in favour of the predators and that creatures like Pliosaurus "ruled the oceans for more than 100 million years". Species: Kimmerosaurus; Pliosaurus funkei (identified as "Predator X"); Stegosaurus; Camptosaurus; Kepodactylus (unidentified); Allosaurus; Allosaurus anax (identified as "Saurophaganax"); unidentified ammonite; Squatina; unidentified fish; Referenced species: Tyrannosaurus; Plesiosaurus (used erroneously to refer to Kimmerosaurus in the last segment)
5	"New Giants"	95 mya	Nigel Paterson	Nigel Paterson	12 October 2011	Unknown
95 million years ago, Late Cretaceous (Argentina, South America); 95 million years ago, Late Cretaceous (Egypt, North Africa) In late Cretaceous South America at a nest site an Argentinosaurus hatches. A Lacusovagus almost immediately attacks it. A Skorpiovenator scares it away and then proceeds to kill and eat the Argentinosaurus hatchling. However, the Skorpiovenator flees when a herd of adult Argentinosaurus arrive, although they offer no protection for the hatchlings, which begin to feed on the surrounding vegetation. The episode then cuts to late Cretaceous North Africa, where a herd of Paralititan take a drink from a river to cool down. They are spooked by a group of crocodiles that emerge from the water, and a juvenile becomes stuck in mud. A Sarcosuchus scares away the crocodiles and closes in on the trapped Paralititan. The episode returns to South America, where the herd of Argentinosaurus move across a volcanic ash field to find food. Because of their sheer size, they churn up the ground with each step, creating quicksand that becomes a death trap for the small Gasparinisaura, travelling with them. The titanosaurs find a clump of trees and begin feeding, but then are attacked by a group of Mapusaurus. The theropods manage to rip a chunk of meat off one of the sauropods, but the latter are not fatally wounded because of their size. During the attack, an agitated Argentinosaurus rears up and crushes one of the less cautious Mapusaurus. Back in North Africa, the Sarcosuchus gets a hold of one of the Paralititans' legs, but a Carcharodontosaurus grips its neck and eventually wrestles it from the giant crocodilian's jaws. However, the adult Paralititan scares it away, and the juvenile survives. The episode finally cuts back to South America, where an injured Argentinosaurus lies dying from a Mapusaurus attack. A time lapse is then shown of Mapusaurus, Skorpiovenator, and Lacusovagus feeding on the carcass until the bones are all that's left. The narrator then explains that when Argentinosaurus became extinct, so did Mapusaurus. The same event happened with Paralititan and Carcharodontosaurus in Africa. The episode concludes with the Argentinosaurus body being shown decaying until only its bones are left to be fossilised, as the narrator explains that "when the sauropods died out, their predators lost their main food supply, and they too were doomed." Species: Argentinosaurus; Mapusaurus; Skorpiovenator; Ouranosaurus; Paralititan; Sarcosuchus; Carcharodontosaurus; Lacusovagus (unidentified); unidentified crocodilian; Gasparinisaura (unidentified); Referenced species: Tyrannosaurus; Allosaurus; Diplodocus; Neovenator; Ornithopsis; Sinraptor; Mamenchisaurus; Sauroposeidon; Acrocanthosaurus; Giganotosaurus
6	"The Great Survivors"	65 / 92 / 85 mya	Nigel Paterson	Nigel Paterson & Tom Brass	19 October 2011	Unknown
65 million years ago, Late Cretaceous (Hațeg Island, Romania) 92 million years ago, Late Cretaceous (Zuni Basin, New Mexico, USA, North America) 85 million years ago, Late Cretaceous (Mongolia, Asia) Towards the end of the Cretaceous period, on Hațeg Island, a herd of Magyarosaurus feed on vegetation, while a Bradycneme hunts lizards amongst them. A group of Hatzegopteryx descend from the sky and hunt and eat young Magyarosaurus. The episode then cuts to North America, 92 million years ago. A Zunityrannus attacks a pair of Nothronychus, but is driven off. The therizinosaurs feed on the surrounding vegetation, but then a group of Zunityrannus attack them. However, the Nothronychus again manage to fight off the Zunityrannus. The tyrannosaurs are forced to scavenge on a nearby carcass of their own species. However, they catch botulism from the rotting flesh and later die. The episode then cuts to Mongolia, 7 million years later. A Gigantoraptor and her mate guard their nest from marauding predators, driving off an Alectrosaurus. The female leaves the male with the nest, presumably to find food. After a rainstorm, the male is attacked by a pair of Alectrosaurus. An Oviraptor raids the nest, but the Gigantoraptor manages to drive off the tyrannosaurs and chases away its smaller relative without losing any eggs. However, he is later buried during a sandstorm, still guarding his nest. The episode then cuts to 65 million years ago, when an enormous asteroid crashes into the Gulf of Mexico, causing devastation upon impact and filling the atmosphere with debris. Four months later on Hațeg Island, most vegetation has died because of the lack of sunlight, starving the Magyarosaurus. Scavengers do well for the time being, with a group of Hatzegopteryx driving a Bradycneme off a carcass. The smaller dinosaur is forced to hunt lizards, while the narrator explains that 60 percent of species became extinct, with the dinosaur's size being what ultimately condemned them to extinction. A montage is then shown of various creatures featured throughout the preceding episodes, with the narrator saying that dinosaurs are the most successful group of animals ever to exist on earth, and that it was "an unprecedented extraterrestrial event that finally saw the end of Planet Dinosaur." Species: Bradycneme; Magyarosaurus; unidentified lizard; Eurazhdarcho (unidentified); Hatzegopteryx; Suskityrannus (identified as "Zunityrannus"); Nothronychus; Oviraptor; Alectrosaurus; Gigantoraptor; Referenced species: Ampelosaurus; Argentinosaurus; Zalmoxes; Telmatosaurus; Styracosaurus; Stygimoloch; Parasaurolophus; Archaeoceratops; Gallimimus; Baryonyx; Polacanthus; Pelecanimimus; Mapusaurus; Majungasaurus; Microraptor

== Spin-offs ==
CBBC aired a spin-off, Planet Dinosaur Files, from 29 September 2011, hosted by Jem Stansfield. Each episode compares three Mesozoic creatures and involves practical tests to replicate certain behaviours in an attempt to find out which creature holds a certain title, such as the "most powerful" theropod. A 60-minute 3-D spin-off of Planet Dinosaur was announced in July 2011, and was broadcast on 19 August 2012 under the name Ultimate Killers. A companion book "Planet Dinosaur: The Next Generation of Killer Giants" was written by Cavan Scott and published sometime in 2012.

== Reception ==
Tom Sutcliffe of The Independent found Planet Dinosaur to be visually "very polished and jazzed up" but that the "knowledge and science generally take second place to B-movie spectacle". Riley Black, in a post on the Smithsonian Magazine website, commented, "What sets Planet Dinosaur apart, and what I enjoyed most, is the fact that a modicum of science is woven into each episode to back up the different vignettes being presented." She also added "...[while] Planet Dinosaur is not that perfect dinosaur documentary that we have all been hoping for, it is still far better than just about anything that I have seen lately."

Gordon Sullivan, from DVD Verdict concluded in a positive way, "Planet Dinosaur is a fine series that gives viewers a good sense of where our knowledge about dinosaurs is at the moment. Combining nature-documentary stylings with a competent narration from smooth-voiced John Hurt, Planet Dinosaur is sure to please budding paleontologists and older dinosaur fans alike."
