= Shock and Awe: The Story of Electricity =

2011 British TV series

- Title screenshot
- Genre: History of science
- Presented by: Jim Al-Khalili
- Narrated by: Jim Al-Khalili
- Country of origin: United Kingdom
- Original language: English
- No. of series: 1
- No. of episodes: 3

Production
- Running time: 45 minutes
- Production companies: Open University and BBC

Original release
- Network: BBC Four
- Release: 6 October – 20 October 2011

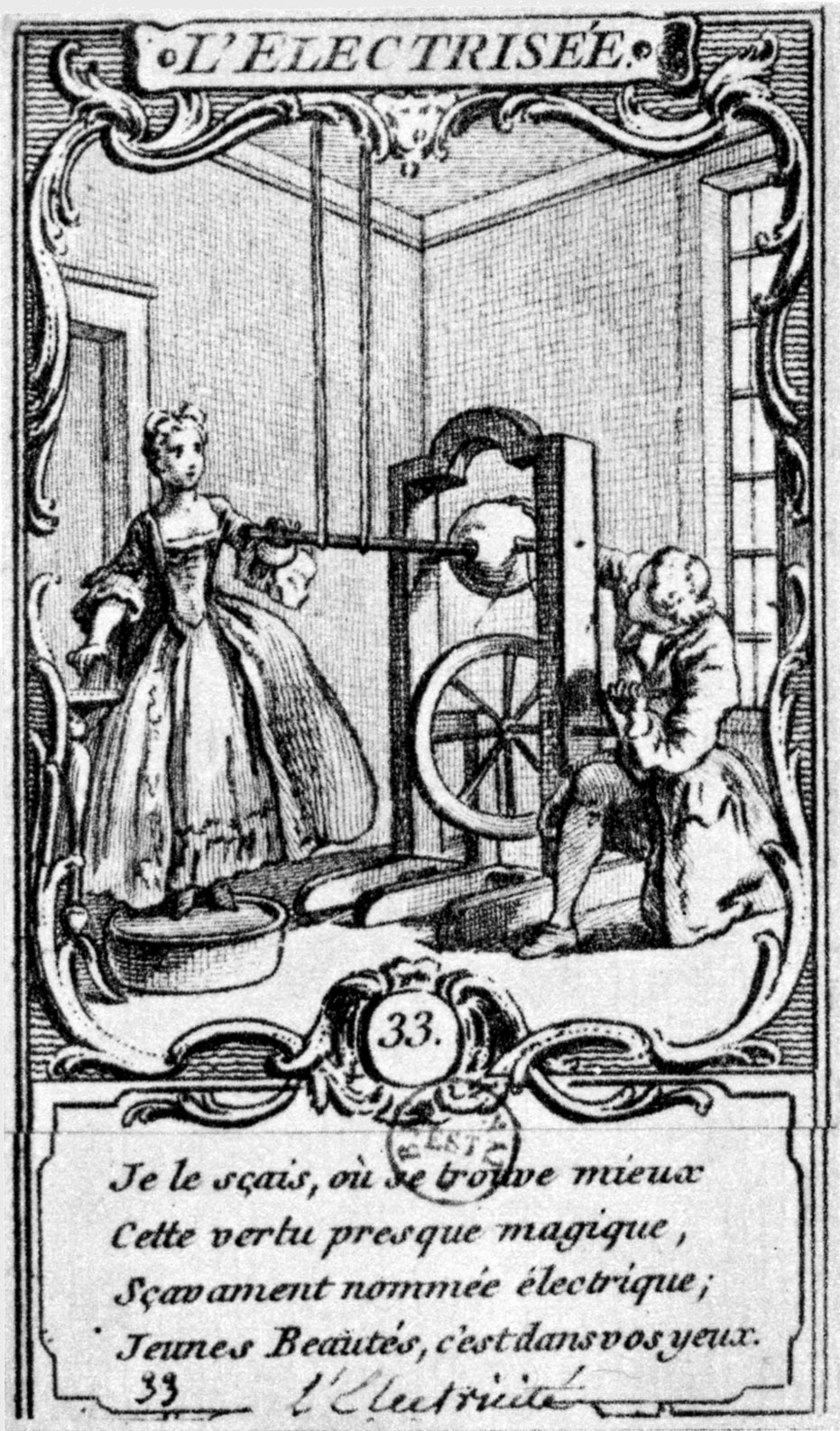
Hauksbee's friction machine using a glass globe, remained common in the 18th century

Shock and Awe: The Story of Electricity is a British television series outlining aspects of the history of electricity. The series was a co-production between the Open University and the BBC and aired from 6 to 20 October 2011 on BBC Four. The programs were presented by Jim Al-Khalili.

== Episodes ==
- Spark: How pioneers unlocked electricity's mysteries and built strange instruments to create it.
- The Age of Invention: How harnessing the link between magnetism and electricity transformed the world.
- Revelations and Revolutions: After centuries of experimentation, how we finally came to understand electromagnetism.

=== Spark ===
In the first episode Al-Khalili introduces the history of our understanding of electricity and the harnessing of its power. He covers the achievements of these "natural philosophers" – Francis Hauksbee, Stephen Gray, Musschenbroek, Benjamin Franklin, Henry Cavendish, Galvani, Volta and Humphry Davy.

The programme starts with Hauksbee's invention of a glass globe static-electricity generator and its subsequent demonstration to the high-minded. It covers Franklin and the resulting experiments to capture and tame lightning. The narrative continues with Cavendish's investigations of the electric shock received from the torpedo fish. Al-Khalili expands on the development of the electric battery following Volta's discovery that simultaneously licking a copper coin and a silver spoon would generate a tingle of electricity. The programme finishes with the first breakthrough in finding a commercial use for electricity: Humphry Davy demonstrating the first carbon-arc light before members of the Royal Institution.

=== The Age of Invention ===
In the second episode Al-Khalili covers the scientists who discovered the links between electricity and magnetism leading to a way to generate electric power- Hans Christian Oersted, Michael Faraday, William Sturgeon and Joseph Henry.

The development of commercial applications started with Samuel Morse and Al-Khalili then tells the story of the 1866 transatlantic cable. He revisits the war of the currents rivalry between direct current and alternating current.

=== Revelations and Revolutions ===
In the final episode Al-Khalili brings the story up to date covering the achievements of James Clerk Maxwell; Heinrich Hertz; Oliver Lodge; Jagadish Bose; William Crookes; Mataré & Welker; and William Shockley.

== See also ==
- History of electromagnetic theory
- History of electrical engineering
- History of electric power transmission
