= Chemistry: A Volatile History =

2010 BBC documentary

- Genre: History of science
- Presented by: Jim Al-Khalili
- Starring: Andrea Sella
- Narrated by: Jim Al-Khalili
- Composer: Ty Unwin
- Original language: English
- No. of series: 1
- No. of episodes: 3

Production
- Executive producer: Sacha Baveystock
- Running time: 60 minutes
- Production company: BBC

Original release
- Network: BBC Four
- Release: 21 January – 4 February 2010

Chemistry: A Volatile History is a 2010 BBC documentary on the history of chemistry presented by Jim Al-Khalili. It was nominated for the 2010 British Academy Television Awards in the category Specialist Factual.

== Episode 1: Discovering the Elements ==
=== Introduction ===
Only in the last 200 years have we known what an element is – a substance that cannot be broken down further by chemical reaction.

The Ancient Greeks, with no way of breaking open substances, could only base their ideas of the elements on what they could see: Earth, Fire, Water and Air.

In the 16th century alchemists were busy trying to turn base metals like lead, into gold.

=== Paracelsus and the tria prima ===
It was the Swiss alchemist and surgeon Paracelsus who first challenged the Ancient Greek idea of four elements.

In 1526 Paracelsus was in Basel, when the famous printer Frobenius was told he would have to have his leg amputated in a life-saving operation. Instead of accepting the received wisdom, he called upon Paracelsus who cured him in the unconventional way of using his alchemical knowledge. This established him as a radical thinker, giving weight to his ideas, principal amongst which was the idea that the world was actually made of three elements: the tria prima comprising salt, sulphur and mercury.

Paracelsus did not succeed in convincing the establishment – instead he managed to enrage them by burning their established medical texts, and eventually had to flee Switzerland for Germany.

It was, however, the alchemical pursuit for gold that led to the first breakthrough in the hunt for new elements.

=== Hennig Brand and the icy noctiluca ===
In 1669 Hennig Brand was looking for a way of extracting gold from the human body, and struck upon the idea of using urine, thinking that urine might contain some part of the 'life force' vital to sustaining human life. To get rid of the unimportant parts, primarily water, Brand boiled the urine for several days until he was left with a thick paste. Finally, fragments of a substance emerged which burned brighter than any Medieval candle available at the time, but which left the vessel it burnt in cold: Brand named this new substance icy noctiluca – 'cold night light'.

Soon after its discovery, icy noctiluca toured the Royal Houses of Europe and in 1677 it came before the Royal Society in London, then under the chairmanship of Charles II, where one of its members decided to investigate.

In his book New Experiments and Observations Made Upon the Icy Noctiluca Robert Boyle describes an experiment in which sulphur and phosphorus powders are mixed causing them to burn fiercely. This discovery was the basis for the invention of the match.

Phosphorus, as icy noctiluca is now known, is used in everything from match heads to toothpaste and ultimately in the Second World War bombs which destroyed the very city in which Brand discovered it – Hamburg.

Whilst Brand never discovered gold, his accidental discovery of the element now known as phosphorus gave rise to the idea that elements could be hidden inside other substances.

=== Robert Boyle and The Sceptical Chymist ===
More than a decade earlier in 1661, a year after the Royal Society opened, Boyle deposited The Sceptical Chymist in its vaults. This book is usually regarded as the turning point that signaled the transition from alchemy to chemistry. The Sceptical Chymist was innovative in several ways: it was not written in Latin, as had been the tradition for alchemist books, but in English; it dispensed with the old chemical symbols for various elements, using English names instead; and most crucially it was actually published, as opposed to kept secret.

Boyle was willing to share his discoveries to allow others to build on his work and further the scientific understanding of the elements. He wanted to put alchemy on a more scientific footing – ditching the metaphysical baggage it had brought with it from the previous century.

Unfortunately, this new age of chemical enlightenment was fraught with blind alleys.

=== Johann Becher and phlogiston ===
In 1667 the German scientist Johann Becker proposed that fire was caused by an ethereal, odourless, tasteless, colourless, weightless entity called phlogiston. The idea was that phlogiston causes things to burn, reducing them to their pure form. For example, burning wood releases phlogiston, leaving the pure form of wood – ash, therefore wood is composed of ash (pure wood) and phlogiston.

Phlogiston was accepted as scientific truth, paralysing the scientific community's ability to discover more, true elements. One scientist even claimed to have isolated phlogiston.

=== Henry Cavendish and inflammable air ===
A major shareholder in the Bank of England with royal connections, Henry Cavendish discovered the first elemental gas.

He added some zinc to spirit of salt (hydrochloric acid) and collected the evanescence given off as bubbles. The gas he collected was tasteless, odourless and colourless, and moreover it produced a squeaky pop in the presence of a flame – this led Cavendish to name the gas inflammable air, which he believed to be one and the same as phlogiston.

Cavendish, though he did not realise it, made an important observation about burning phlogiston in air; a dewy liquid was formed on the inside of the glassware: water. This should have had enormous repercussions for the whole scientific community in the 1700s, who still believed water to be an elemental substance. Yet, if water could be made by burning inflammable air, then water is not an element, but a compound.

However, it simply did not occur to Cavendish that water was a compound – instead he assumed that the airs contained a form of water, which phlogiston modified into liquid, elemental water.

Phlogiston had given the Ancient Greek idea of water as an element a brief reprieve, but the Greek system was now under heavy scrutiny as the Royal Society commissioned its members to investigate the invisible airs.

=== Joseph Priestley and dephlogisticated air ===
By the mid-1700s there were three known 'airs':

- Common air – the air we breathe;
- Cavendish's inflammable air;
- Fixed air.

It was this last air which caught the attention of Joseph Priestley, a Unitarian minister whose favourite pastime was the investigation of airs – specifically, fixed air, given off by the fermentation process in breweries.

Priestley's passion for science led to an invitation to Bowood House, to tutor the children of Lord Shelburne. This was an excellent opportunity, given that Priestley did not have the money of earlier chemists like Boyle and Cavendish, and would still be free to pursue his own research.

In 1774 Priestley performed a hugely important experiment: he heated mercuric calc and collected the gas given off. He discovered that this gas was able to relight the embers of a previously lit wooden splint. He concluded that the splint was introducing phlogiston to the gas, only after which could it burn, therefore the gas must be 'without phlogiston' – this led Priestley to name it dephlogisticated air.

In October 1775 Priestley accompanied Lord Shelburne on a trip to Paris where they were invited to dine with the preeminent scientists of the time. It is here that Priestley met the French scientist Antoine Lavoisier.

=== Antoine Lavoisier and the end of phlogiston ===
Priestley told Lavoisier all the details of his experiments upon the production of dephlogisticated air. Unlike Priestley, Lavoisier had one of the best equipped laboratories in Europe and now turned his attention to the highly accurate measurement of the masses of substances before and after they were heated.

Lavoisier weighted a sample of tin, then reweighed after he had heated it and found it had increased in mass. This was an unexpected result given that the tin was thought to have released phlogiston during the burning process. Lavoisier was struck with a ground-breaking thought – maybe the tin had absorbed something from the air, making it heavier, but if so, what?

To investigate this further, Lavoisier reran Priestley's experiment in reverse – he heated some mercury in a sealed container until it turned into mercuric calc and measured the amount of air absorbed. He then heated the mercuric calc and measured the amount of air released and discovered the quantities were the same. Lavoisier realised that something was absorbed from the air when mercury was heated to make mercuric calc, and that same gas was released when the mercuric calc was heated. Lavoisier concluded that this gas was unrelated to phlogiston, but was in fact a brand new element, which he named oxygen.

Lavoisier had successfully dispensed with the need for the theory of phlogiston and recognised Priestley's 'dephlogisticated air' as the element oxygen. Despite the fact it was Priestley's original work that laid the foundations for his discovery, Lavoisier claimed he had discovered oxygen; Priestley, after all, had failed to recognise it as a new element.

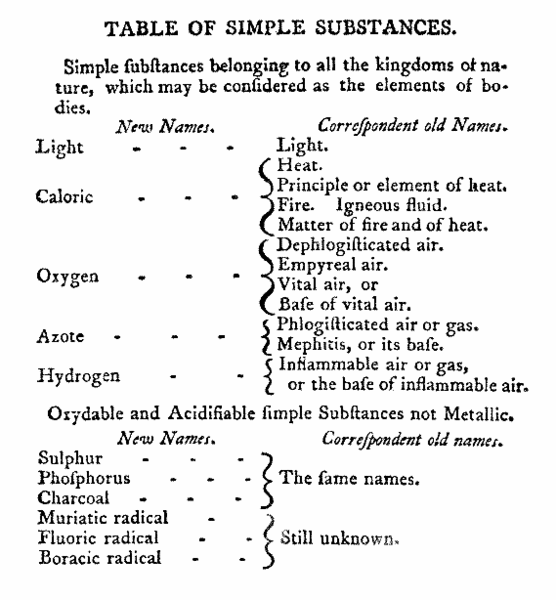
Table from the English translation of Lavoisier's Traité élémentaire de chimie, 2 vols. Chez Cuchet, Paris (1789). Translated from the French by Robert Kerr, Elements of Chemistry, 4th edition. William Creech, Edinburgh: (1790).

Lavoisier went on to give science its first definition of an element: a substance that cannot be decomposed by existing chemical means. He also set about drawing up a list of all the elements – now 33 elements replaced the ancient four. His list was grouped into four categories: gases, non-metals, metals and earths.

On top of this, Lavoisier created a classification system for the ever-increasing array of chemicals being discovered. As mentioned, 'dephlogisticated air' became oxygen, 'inflammable air' became hydrogen, but the nomenclature of compounds was also put on a more logical footing as 'oil of vitriol' became sulphuric acid, 'philosophical wool' became zinc oxide and 'astringent mars saffron' became iron oxide.

Unfortunately, whilst Lavoisier had rid the world of the phlogiston paradigm, he introduced two new erroneous elements now known to be pure energy: lumière and calorique; light and heat.

In revenge for his sympathies with the revolutionaries in France, Priestley's home in England was targeted by arsonists in 1791, luckily he escaped thanks to a tip-off, but decided to flee to America. Lavoisier's contributions to science were cut short in 1794 by the revolutionaries, who arrested him on grounds of being an enemy of the French people, and had him guillotined.

=== Humphry Davy and potash ===
In 1807, the Professor of Chemistry at the Royal Institution in London was the Cornishman Humphry Davy. He was investigating crystalline salts of potash because he was unconvinced potash was an element, but by the end of the previous century, Lavoisier had been unable to break it down further.

Since then however, the first electric battery had recently been invented (rows of metal plates and cardboard soaked in saltwater). Although scientists were aware that the production of a continuous electric current was due to some property of the metals, Davy believed that a chemical reaction was taking place. If that was true, then maybe the reverse was also true: an electric current could cause a chemical reaction.

Davy heated the potash until it was liquid, then introduced two electrodes and passed a current through the molten potash. A lilac flame was observed, the result of successfully breaking down potash into its constituent elements – one of which, was the previously never before seen element potassium.

Davy went on to add six new elements to Lavoisier's list, as well as confirming that substances like chlorine and iodine were also elements. By the time of his death in 1829 the idea of the elements was firmly established, 55 separate elements had been discovered, and the world had a new science: Chemistry.

== Episode 2: The Order of the Elements ==
=== Introduction ===
At the beginning of the 19th century only 55 of the 92 naturally occurring elements had been discovered. Scientists had no idea how many more they might find, or indeed if there were an infinite number of elements. They also sought to answer a fundamental question, namely: is there a pattern to the elements?

=== John Dalton's atoms ===
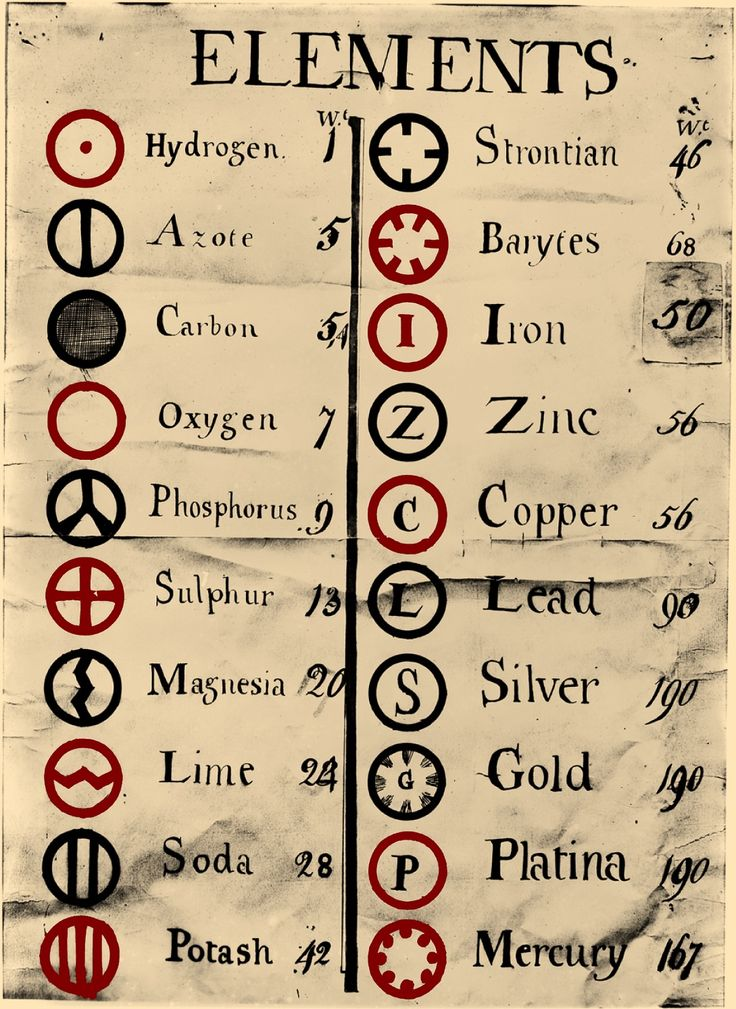
Dalton's atomic symbols, from his own books.

Scientists had recently discovered that when elements combine to form compounds, they always do so in the same proportions, by weight. John Dalton thought that for this to happen, each element had to be made of its own unique building blocks, which he called atoms.

Dalton suggested that everything in the universe was made of atoms, and that there are as many kinds of atoms as there are elements, each one with its own signature weight. Based on these ideas, working completely alone, Dalton attempted to impose some order on the elements by drawing up a list, where each element was represented by an alchemical-looking symbol, ordered by atomic weight.

Although Dalton did not get all his atomic weights correct, he was pointing science in the right direction. Sadly, in the early 1800s few scientists accepted the idea that elements had different weights.

=== Jöns Jacob Berzelius' pursuit of atomic weights ===
The Swedish scientist Jöns Jacob Berzelius was one of the few scientists who strongly believed in the idea of atomic weights, and thought that knowing as much as possible about their weights was vitally important. When he heard of Dalton's theory, he set about the gargantuan task of measuring the atomic weight of every single known element – without any proof that Dalton's atoms actually existed.

This was even more challenging than it first seems once you consider the fact that very little of the chemical glassware necessary for such precise measurements had been invented. Berzelius had to manufacture much of it himself.

Berzelius' experiences with glass-blowing had an additional bonus, in 1824 he discovered that one of the constituents of glass was a new element – silicon. Having already discovered three other elements prior to silicon: thorium, cerium and selenium, Berzelius spent the next ten years obsessively measuring more than two thousand chemical compounds in pursuit of accurate atomic weights for the elements. Eventually Berzelius had remarkably accurate atomic weights for 45 elements; his value for chlorine was accurate to within 0.2% of the value we know today.

However, by the time Berzelius had produced his results, other scientists were now measuring atomic weights – and getting conflicting results. In fact, scientists were looking for all sorts of patterns throughout the elements.

=== Johann Döbereiner's triads ===
One such pattern hunter was German chemist Johann Döbereiner. He believed the key to understanding the elements lay not with their atomic weights but with their chemical properties. He noticed that one could often single out three elements that exhibited similar properties, such as the alkali metals, which he called triads.

The problem was that Döbereiner's triads only worked for a few of the elements and got scientists no further than atomic weights.

=== Dmitri Mendeleev moves to St Petersburg ===
In 1848 a huge fire destroyed the factory of the widow Maria Mendeleeva. Facing destitution she decided to embark on the 1,300 mile journey from Western Siberia to St Petersburg – walking a significant portion of the route – so her son Dmitri Mendeleev could continue his education in the capital of the Russian Empire.

At the time the scientific community was grappling with the problem of how to bring order to the 63 elements that were now known. Mendeleev was still a student when he attended the world's first international chemistry congress – convened to settle the confusion surrounding atomic weights.

=== Stanislao Cannizzaro's standard for measuring atomic weights ===
Sicilian chemist Stanislao Cannizzaro was still convinced that atomic weights held the key to the order of the elements and had found a new way of measuring them. Cannizzaro knew that equal volumes of gases contain equal numbers of particles, therefore instead of working with solids and liquids and all the unreliability that entails, he proposed measuring the densities of gases to measure the weights of individual gaseous atoms.

Whereas Berzelius' results had failed to convince anyone, Cannizzaro's method set an agreed standard for measuring atomic weights accurately. Chemists soon found that even with accurate atomic weights, the elements still seemed unordered, but then, a solitary English chemist made a curious discovery.

=== John Newlands' octaves ===
Visualization of John Newlands' Law of Octaves.

In 1863 John Newlands noticed that when ordered by weight, every eighth element seemed to share similar properties, such as carbon and silicon in the sequence: carbon, nitrogen, oxygen, fluorine, sodium, magnesium and silicon. He called this a Law of Octaves.

Three years later, in 1866, he presented his ideas to the Chemical Society, unfortunately for Newlands, the musical analogy was not well received – the audience suggesting he might as well have ordered the elements alphabetically.

Today, Newlands' Octaves are known as the Law of Periodicity, and Mendeleev was thinking along the same lines.

=== Mendeleev's periodic table ===
By 1869 Mendeleev had been trying to find an order for the elements for a decade. One day he struck upon the idea of making up a pack of cards with the elements' names on and began playing a game he called 'chemical solitaire'. He began laying out the cards, over and over, just to see if he could form a pattern where everything fitted together.

To date, chemists had tried to group elements in one of two ways:

- By their atomic weights (Berzelius' and Cannizzaro's Atomic Weights);
- By their chemical properties (Döbereiner's Triads and Newland's Octaves).

Mendeleev's genius was to combine those two methods together. However, the odds were stacked against him – little more than half the known elements had been discovered: he was playing with an incomplete deck of cards.

He stayed up for three days and nights then, finally, on 17 February 1869, he fell asleep and dreamt of all 63 known elements laid out in a grand table.

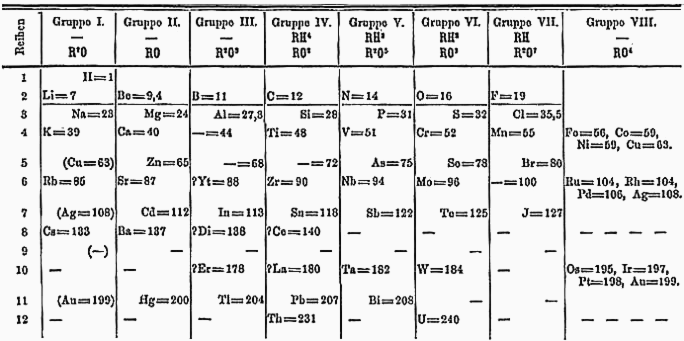
Dmitri Mendeleev's periodic table from 1871 with gaps (-) left for new elements.

Mendeleev's table reveals the relationship between all the elements in their order:

- Atomic weights increase reading from left to right;
- Triads and Octaves are visible reading down the columns.

Notice carbon and silicon are in Group IV and the volatile gases fluorine, chlorine and bromine are in Group VII.

Mendeleev was sufficiently confident in the layout of his table that he was willing to leave gaps for unknown elements to make the pattern fit – believing other elements would later be discovered that filled the gaps.

- After Calcium (Ca, weight 40) he left a gap, predicting a metallic element slightly heavier than calcium;
- After Zinc (Zn, weight 65) he left a gap, predicting a metal with a low melting point and atomic weight 68;
- Immediately after that gap, he left a further gap, predicting another metal, dark grey in colour.

So, for Mendeleev to be vindicated, the gaps needed to be filled, and luckily, in 1859, new instrumentation had been developed for discovering elements.

=== Bunsen's burner and Kirchhoff's spectrometer ===
Robert Bunsen knew that when certain elements burned in the flames of his burner they each turned the flame a different colour. Copper burned green, strontium red and potassium lilac – Bunsen wondered if every element had a unique colour.

Bunsen was joined in his research by Gustav Kirchhoff. Kirchhoff used the concept of the dispersion of white light by a prism in the invention of the spectroscope, a device with a prism at its centre which split the light from Bunsen's flames into distinct bands of its constituent colours – the element's spectral lines.

Kirchhoff and Bunsen realised these spectral lines were unique to each element, and, using this technique they discovered two new elements, cesium and rubidium.

=== Paul Emile Lecoq de Boisbaudran discovers gallium ===
In 1875, the Parisian chemist Paul Emile Lecoq de Boisbaudran used a spectroscope to discover a new metallic element. It was a silvery-white, soft metal with an atomic weight of 68, which he named gallium, after his native France. It also turned out to have a very low melting point, thus matching all the expected properties of the element Mendeleev expected to fill the gap he had left after zinc; indeed, this is exactly where the element was placed in the periodic table.

Even though Mendeleev had left the necessary gap for gallium as well as other elements, it was becoming clear there was an entire group that was missing altogether.

=== Pierre Janssen and Norman Lockyer discover helium ===
In 1868, the French astronomer Pierre Janssen travelled to India in time for the total solar eclipse that occurred in August of that year. As well as his telescope, he also went equipped with a spectroscope, to study the spectral lines of the light emitted from the sun. Normally, due to the intensity of sunlight many weaker spectral lines are not visible next to the extreme brightness of the stronger lines. Janssen hoped that he would observe more spectral lines during the eclipse when the sun's light was less intense.

The eclipse allowed Janssen to observe a spectral line never seen before, which was not associated with any known element. The same spectral line was confirmed by the English astronomer Norman Lockyer, who thinking the element only existed in the sun, named it helium, after the Greek Sun God.

However, it wasn't long before another British scientist had discovered helium on Earth.

=== William Ramsay discovers the noble gases ===
By dissolving the radioactive ore cleveite in acid, William Ramsay was able to collect a gas trapped within the rock, which had an atomic weight of 4, and the same spectral lines which Lockyer had observed: helium. Prior to this, Ramsay had already isolated a new gas from the atmosphere; argon, with an atomic weight of 40.

A problem now arose – Mendeleev had not left any gaps which were suitable for either of these two new elements, which led Ramsay to conclude an entire group was missing from the periodic table – only two of whose members were now known to exist, helium and argon.

Ramsey successfully discovered all the other stable elements in the group which he named neon (Greek for new), krypton (Greek for hidden) and xenon (Greek for stranger). All the elements of this new group had one overwhelming characteristic; their lack of reactivity. It was this particular characteristic that brought to mind a name for the new group: the noble gases.

=== Mendeleev vindicated ===
Mendeleev's periodic table had brought order to all the elements, allowing him to make predictions that future scientists tested and found to be true. By the time he died he was world-renowned in chemistry. His periodic table was set in stone in St Petersburg and an element was eventually named after him: mendelevium.

The periodic table does not however tell us why some elements are highly reactive, others completely inert, why some are volatile, whilst others less so. It wasn't until the beginning of the 20th century that an entirely different branch of science began to unravel the answers to these questions.

=== Niels Bohr's fixed shell model ===
In 1909, the physicist Ernest Rutherford proposed the structure of the atom was like that of a solar system: mostly empty space with electrons floating around a dense nucleus.

Subsequently, the Danish Physicist Niels Bohr introduced the idea that electrons occupied "fixed shells" around the nucleus, which was further developed when it was suggested that each such shell could only accommodate a fixed number of electrons: 2 in the first shell; 8 in the second shell; 18 in the third shell, and so on, each shell holding an increasing number of electrons.

The chemical behaviour of all elements is explained by the number of electrons in their outer shells: to increase the energetic stability of their electron configurations atoms have a tendency to gain or lose electrons in such a way so as to achieve a full outer shell. Sodium, with 11 electrons – one in its outer-most occupied shell, will transfer an electron in the presence of fluorine to its outer-most occupied shell, which contains seven electrons. The result is both sodium and fluorine now have a full outer shell, and Sodium Fluoride is formed.

This theory explained why all elements react in the way they do and why some formed the compounds they do, while others did not. It also explained why elements had the physical properties they did, which in turn explained why the periodic table had the shape it did. However, there was one fundamental question left unanswered: how many elements were there – could there be an infinite number of elements between Hydrogen and Uranium?

=== Henry Moseley's proton numbers ===
Early 20th century chemist Henry Moseley speculated that the answer to the number of protons lay in the nucleus. By firing a radioactive source at copper, he was able to knock electrons from their atoms, releasing a burst of energy in the form of an x-ray. When measured, the x-rays always had the same energy, unique to copper. He discovered each element released x-rays of different energies. Moseley's brilliance was to realise the x-ray energy is related to the number of protons inside the atom: the atomic number.

Because this is the number of protons, the atomic number must be a whole number – there cannot be any fractional values. Moseley realised it was the atomic number, not the atomic weight that determines the order of the elements. What's more, because the atomic number increases in whole numbers from one element to the next there can be no extra elements between Hydrogen (atomic number 1) and Uranium (atomic number 92) – there can only be 92 elements, there is no room for any more.

Moseley was just 26 when he completed this research. Aged 27 he was killed in action during the First World War – shot through the head by a sniper.

== Episode 3: The Power of the Elements ==
=== Introduction ===
Just 92 elements combine to form all the compounds on Earth. Iron, when combined with chromium, carbon and nickel makes stainless steel. Glass is made of silicon and oxygen.

Since prehistoric times, people have been engaging in 'bucket chemistry' – adding all sorts of chemicals together, just to see what would happen. As a result, many early discoveries in chemistry were accidental.

=== Heinrich Diesbach produces the first synthetic paint ===
In 18th century Prussia, Heinrich Diesbach was trying to produce a synthetic red paint. He started by heating potash (potassium carbonate), with no idea that his potash had been contaminated with blood. When heated, the proteins in blood are altered, allowing them to combine with the iron in the blood, whilst the carbonate reacts with the haemoglobin to produce a solid.

After heating the resulting solid to an ash, filtering and diluting, Diesbach added green vitriol (iron sulphate) to create a complex ion: ferric ferrocyanide. Finally, adding spirit of salt (hydrochloric acid) draws out a brilliant colour: Prussian blue.

=== Justus von Liebig and Friedrich Wöhler encounter isomerism ===
Ever since seeing fireworks as a child, another German chemist, Justus von Liebig, had become obsessed with trying to better understand the elements by creating explosive combinations. Specifically, he was interested in the explosive compound silver fulminate.

In 1825 he read a paper written by Friedrich Wöhler in which he describes a compound called silver cyanate, made in equal parts of silver, carbon, nitrogen and oxygen, which he described as harmless and stable. Von Liebig immediately wrote back a furious letter condemning Wöhler as a hopeless analyst: those elements combined in equal proportions were exactly what made the explosive silver fulminate.

Instead of backing down, Wöhler challenged von Liebig to make silver cyanate for himself. The results would have astounded him – the same elements that combined according to von Liebig's method, when combined according to Wöhler's method made two completely different compounds.

Wöhler and von Liebig had inadvertently discovered isomerism: the same number of atoms of the same elements combining in different ways to make different compounds. In time, this would explain how just 92 elements could make the vast array of compounds we know today.

Chemists started to realise that understanding the arrangement of atoms within compounds was crucial if they wished to design new compounds, and the first step in this direction was taken by studying carbon.

=== Smithson Tennant discovers what diamonds are made of ===
In 1796 Smithson Tennant was experimenting on diamonds when he decided to burn one. Using only sunlight and a magnifying glass he managed to ignite a diamond sufficiently for it to produce a gas, which he collected and was able to identify as carbon dioxide.

Having started with only diamond and oxygen, and produced a gas which contains only carbon and oxygen, Tennant had discovered that diamonds are made of carbon.

Unaware of atomic theory at the time, scientists were unable to explain how carbon, already known to exist as one of the softest substances in the form of graphite, could also be the sole constituent element of the hardest known substance: diamond.

Exactly 50 years later, a young Scottish chemist discovered there are no prizes in Science for coming second.

=== Archibald Scott Couper formulates the theory of chemical bonds ===
In 1856 Archibald Scott Couper went to work for a French chemist, Charles-Adolphe Wurtz. Whilst in Paris he came up with the idea of links between atoms that could explain how individual atoms formed compounds. He called these links bonds. Somehow, Couper realised that carbon can form four bonds, thereby attaching itself with different strengths to other carbon atoms in a compound:

- In diamond all four bonds are connected to other carbon atoms in three-dimensions, making it so hard.
- In graphite only three bonds are connected to other carbon atoms in a two-dimensional hexagonal lattice, allowing layers to slide over each other, making graphite soft.

The ability of carbon to form four bonds also means it can exist in a huge variety of chemical structures, such as long chains and even rings, making it a rarity amongst the elements. This helped to explain the abundance of carbon in all life forms, from protein and fat, to DNA and cellulose, and why carbon exists in more compounds than any other element.

All that remained for Couper was to get his paper published...

=== Friedrich Kekulé formulates the same theory of chemical bonds ===
Friedrich Kekulé was a German scientist who spent some time studying in London. It was apparently whilst riding a London bus he struck upon the idea of atoms 'holding hands' to form long chains. Kekulé rushed to compose a paper formalising his ideas on an equivalent theory of chemical bonds.

Meanwhile, in Paris, Wurtz had been slow to publish Couper's paper and Kekulé, whose work appeared in print first, claimed all the credit. When Couper discovered Wurtz had delayed in sending his paper to be published he flew into a rage and was promptly expelled from the laboratory by Wurtz.

The crushing disappointment at having lost out on his chance of scientific recognition led him first to withdraw from Science and then to suffer a nervous breakdown. He spent years in and out of an asylum.

However, now that scientists were beginning to understand the way carbon combines with itself and other elements, it was possible to create new compounds by design and industrial chemistry was born.

=== Wallace Carothers invents nylon ===
Two decades after the world's first plastic – Bakelite – had been invented in 1907, Wallace Carothers successfully drew off a fibre from the interface of two liquids: hexane-1,6-diamine and decanedioyl-dichloride, which could be spun into a very fine, very strong thread. It was given the name nylon.

Shockingly, only three weeks after the patent for nylon had been filed, a depressed Carothers slipped another carbon based compound into his own drink, potassium cyanide, and killed himself.

Evidently, industrial chemistry wasn't without its downsides, and one chemist was arguably responsible for single-handedly polluting the entire Earth with lead.

=== Thomas Midgley Jr. prevents engines from knocking ===
In his capacity as an engineer with General Motors, Thomas Midgley Jr. experimented with a myriad of different compounds, which he added to petrol in an attempt to prevent engines from knocking. Eventually, he discovered one compound that worked brilliantly: tetraethyllead.

By the 1970s the use of leaded petrol was ubiquitous worldwide, but research was emerging about the damage that it was doing to humans and the environment. In 1983, a Royal Commission asked the question: "Is there any part of the Earth’s surface, or any form of life that remains uncontaminated?"

Today nearly all petrol is unleaded, although lead lives on in motor vehicles in their batteries.

=== Henri Becquerel discovers radioactivity ===
In 1896 the French scientist Henri Becquerel was working with uranium crystals when he found UV light made them glow. Leaving the uranium crystals on an unexposed photographic plate overnight, he returned the next morning to discover they had caused the part of the plate they were sat on to develop.

Becquerel correctly reasoned the only source of energy that could have caused this was the crystals themselves. He had discovered radioactivity, and a young Polish scientist began to investigate.

=== Marie Curie investigates radioactivity ===
Marie Curie began her investigations by testing a uranium ore called pitchblende with an electrometer. She discovered it was four times more radioactive than pure uranium, and wondered if this was due to the presence of an even more radioactive element in the pitchblende.

Curie began stockpiling tonnes of pitchblende, then in the most basic of workshops with primitive equipment she undertook a multitude of complex and dangerous procedures in an attempt to isolate this new element.

In the event, Curie discovered two new elements, polonium named after her native Poland and radium. Whilst these were naturally occurring elements, they fuelled a scientific desire to create entirely new, artificial elements.

=== Ernest Rutherford explains radioactivity ===
At the beginning of the 20th century it was widely believed that atoms never change: an atom of one element stayed that way forever. Rutherford had already revealed the structure of an atom to consist mostly of empty space with a dense nucleus of protons at the centre, and Henry Mosley had shown that it is the number of protons that gives an atom its identity as a particular element. An atom of the element carbon has 6 protons, whilst an atom with 7 protons is one of nitrogen.

Rutherford came to the conclusion that the number of protons in a radioactive element could change – through a process of decay where parts of the nucleus are ejected from the atom. Rutherford named these fragments of ejected nucleus alpha particles.

Rutherford realised that if an atom is losing protons, its identity is changing at the same time, since an atom's identity is governed by its proton number. Radioactive decay causes atoms of one element to transmute into atoms of a different element. He then sought to artificially engineer a specific transmutation.

Rutherford fixed a source of alpha particles – each of which contains two protons – at one end of a cylindrical chamber. At the other end he fixed a screen. Each time an alpha particle reached the screen it produced a flash. He then introduced nitrogen into the chamber and observed additional, different flashes on the screen. Occasionally, an alpha particle would collide with a nitrogen nucleus and get absorbed by it, knocking out a proton in the process. These protons then travelled on through the chamber to the screen to produce the additional flashes.

However, the nucleus of nitrogen – having absorbed two protons but lost only one – had gained a proton and become a nucleus of oxygen. Rutherford's work gave hope to scientists trying to create new elements, but one final discovery about the atom was necessary.

In 1932 the Cambridge scientist James Chadwick discovered the neutron – electrically neutral particles which also sit inside the nucleus along with the protons.

=== Enrico Fermi claims to have made elements heavier than uranium ===
Now in Italy, Enrico Fermi – nicknamed 'the pope' by his colleagues for his infallibility, realised the potential of the newly discovered neutron in the search for elements heavier than uranium. Until now, scientists had been bombarding uranium with alpha particles in the hope they would enter the nucleus. Unfortunately, this was very unlikely because both alpha particles and nuclei are positively charged – the alpha particles could never overcome the electrostatic repulsion of the nucleus.

Fermi reasoned that because neutrons carried no electric charge, they would have a much better chance of penetrating the nucleus of a uranium atom. So Fermi set about firing neutrons at uranium. Fermi thought that this, coupled with his knowledge of beta decay, whereby an unstable nucleus attempts stabilisation by converting one neutron to a proton and ejecting a newly formed electron, would result in an element with one extra proton than uranium: element 93.

Indeed, Fermi discovered elements he did not recognise. He tested for elements below uranium in the periodic table: radon, actinium, polonium, as far back as lead – it was none of these. So, in 1934, the infallible Fermi declared to the world he had created elements heavier than uranium.

=== Otto Hahn disproves Fermi’s claims ===
In 1938, a team of German scientists, led by Otto Hahn, decided to investigate Fermi's bold claim. Unfortunately for Fermi, they quickly disproved his assertion; one of the elements produced was barium, which, with 56 protons, was nowhere near the 92 protons the nucleus started with when it was uranium.

Hahn wrote of his confusion to his colleague Lise Meitner who, as an Austrian Jew, had recently fled Nazi Germany for Sweden.

=== Lise Meitner explains Fermi's work ===
Over Christmas 1938, Meitner considered the problem of the uranium nucleus, which she reasoned, given its relative size, must be quite unstable. She decided to model the nucleus as a drop of water, ready to divide with the impact of a single neutron. She realised the nucleus had split in half, and both Fermi and Hahn had witnessed what is now known as nuclear fission.

However, in doing the calculations for such an event, Meitner was unable to make the equations balance. She calculated that the products of the fission reaction were lighter than the initial uranium, by about one fifth of a proton. Somehow, a small amount of mass had disappeared. Then slowly, the solution to this discrepancy occurred to Meitner – Einstein and E = mc^{2} – the missing mass had been converted to energy.

=== The Manhattan Project ===
Meitner's work was published in 1939, but as well generating interest amongst the scientific community, Meitner's revelations were also coming to the attention of governments on the verge of war. Fuelled by fears Nazi Germany was investigating nuclear weapons of its own, scientists were assembled in America to work on the Manhattan Project aimed at creating the first atomic bomb.

For an explosion to occur, there must be a rapid release of energy – a slow release of energy from uranium nuclei would give a uranium fire, but no explosion. Both sides poured their effort into creating the necessary conditions for a chain reaction.

In 1942 Enrico Fermi, now living in America, successfully induced a chain reaction in uranium, but processing uranium for bombs was both difficult and costly. America had just come up with a different solution to win the atomic race.

Now finally, scientists' dream of creating an element beyond the end of the periodic table was about to be realized.

=== Edwin McMillan and Philip H. Abelson create the first synthetic element ===
In California, scientists were trying to create a new element heavier than uranium using cyclotron machines. This involved using huge magnets to steer atoms round in circles faster and faster until they reached a tenth of the speed of light, whereupon they were smashed into a uranium target.

Edwin McMillan and Philip H. Abelson blasted uranium with a beam of particles to create the first synthetic element, heavier than uranium – element 93, which they named neptunium.

The next synthetic element, plutonium, quickly followed in 1941, which scientists realized was readily able to undergo fission in a way capable of producing the desired chain reaction. It was soon being made into a bomb.

A mere seven years after the discovery of nuclear fission, on 6 August 1945, half a gram of uranium was converted into energy when the world's first atomic bomb was dropped on Hiroshima. As Lisa Meitner's calculations suggested, this conversion released energy equivalent to 13,000 tons of TNT. A plutonium bomb was dropped on Nagasaki three days later.

=== GSI Helmholtz Centre for Heavy Ion Research ===
Using one of the world's largest particle accelerators, scientists working at the Heavy Ion Research facility in Darmstadt, Germany, have so far confirmed the existence of element 112, which they have named copernicium, after Polish astronomer Nicholas Copernicus.

In addition to producing new elements, scientists are also attempting to discern their properties. Copernicium is found to be a volatile metal that would be liquid at room temperature if enough were ever made – exactly what Mendeleev would predict for an element that sits directly beneath liquid mercury in the periodic table.

== Broadcast in the United States ==
It aired in the United States under the title "Unlocking the Universe."

== Region 2 DVD release ==
The full series was released as a region 2 DVD set in 2015 by the Dutch company B-Motion.
