= Black Holes, Wormholes and Time Machines =

1999 book by Jim Al-Khalili

- Paperback edition
- Author: Jim Al-Khalili
- Language: English
- Subject: Physics; Science
- Genre: Popular science
- Publisher: Taylor & Francis
- Publication date: 1999
- Publication place: United Kingdom
- Media type: Print
- Pages: 290 pp.
- ISBN: 978-0750305600
- Followed by: Nucleus: A Trip into the Heart of Matter

Black Holes, Wormholes and Time Machines is a book by physicist Jim Al-Khalili, published in 1999. Al-Khalili talks about a range of modern science topics, from geometry to the theory of relativity.
