= The Secrets of Quantum Physics =

2014 British TV series

- Genre: Documentary
- Directed by: Tim Usborne; Kenny Scott
- Presented by: Jim Al-Khalili
- Country of origin: United Kingdom
- No. of series: 1
- No. of episodes: 2

Production
- Executive producer: Paul Sen
- Producers: Tim Usborne; Kenny Scott
- Running time: 55 minutes
- Production company: BBC

Original release
- Network: BBC Four
- Release: 9 December – 16 December 2014

The Secrets of Quantum Physics is a two-part British television series outlining the theories of quantum mechanics and quantum biology, described as "a brilliant guide" to a "jaw-dropping world". It is narrated and presented by Jim Al-Khalili.

== Episodes ==
No.	Title	Original release date
1	"Einstein's Nightmare"	8 December 2014
This episode traces a path from the 1800s through the jazz age to the hippy era, highlighting the insights into light which illuminated the true nature of reality, the conflicts with the ideas of Albert Einstein and recreating the test to resolve this conflict devised by John Stewart Bell in the 1960s. The episode is illustrated with vaudevillian analogies, including playing cards with the Devil, demonstrating the thematic relations to Lewis Carroll.
2	"Let There Be Life"	16 December 2014
This episode ponders the possibility that quantum physics explains some biological mysteries, including the use of quantum entanglement for navigation by the European robin, the use of quantum vibrations for smell by humans, and the part played by the Uncertainty Principle in evolution. The episode gives a novel spin on the subject, illustrated with floating balls in the style of The Prisoner.

== Reception ==
Julia Raeside, writing in The Guardian, states that while Al-Khalili started gently with innocuous chat he soon led audiences down a rabbit hole of true scientific bewilderment, creating a bona fide head-breaker from start to sensational finish. Gary Rose, writing in the RadioTimes notes that Al-Khalili, who touched on the topic in his earlier series Atom, takes the subject to a deeper level.

Al-Khalili, who is emphatic and engaging, performed low-fi demonstrations with simple props, such as coins, gloves and cocktail paraphernalia, to explain mind-melting concepts clearly.

Andrew Mueller, also writing in The Guardian, concludes that the series does what all good science journalism does, prompt the viewer to look at the world with a different and renewed appreciation.
