= Science and Islam (TV series) =

Film

Science and Islam (2009) is a three-part BBC documentary about the history of science in medieval Islamic civilization presented by Jim Al-Khalili. The series is accompanied by the book Science and Islam: A History written by Ehsan Masood.

== Episodes ==
Title card

1. "The Language of Science"
2. "The Empire of Reason"
3. "The Power of Doubt"

== Interviews ==
The documentary contains several short segments with scientists and historians of science:

- George Saliba
- Simon Schaffer
- Peter Pormann (medicine)
- Amira K. Bennison
- Okasha El Daly (egyptology)
- Ian Stewart (algebra)
- Nader El-Bizri

== See also ==
- List of Islamic films
