= The Beginning and End of the Universe =

- Genre: Cosmology
- Created by: Laura Mulholland and Ben J Wilson
- Directed by: Nigel Paterson and Ben J Wilson
- Presented by: Jim Al-Khalili
- Country of origin: United Kingdom
- Original language: English
- No. of series: 1
- No. of episodes: 2

Production
- Executive producer: Jonathan Renouf
- Producers: Nigel Paterson and Ben J Wilson
- Running time: 59 minutes
- Production company: BBC; Open University

Original release
- Network: BBC Four
- Release: 22 March – 29 March 2016

The Beginning and End of the Universe is a two-part British television series outlining the theory of the beginning of the universe and the theories about its ending.

== Episodes ==
=== Episode One: The Beginning ===
This episode, exploring theories of how the universe came into being, outlines the realisation of Edwin Hubble that the universe is expanding, and the discovery of the residual radiation that gave weight to the Big Bang theory. It also highlights some lesser known theorists including Georges Lemaître, who first theorised that there was a big bang, Ralph Alpher, who stated that the light from this should be detectable, and Cecilia Payne, who calculated that hydrogen and helium were the dominant elements in the universe. The episode concludes at the Large Hadron Collider, where physicists create matter in a similar manner to the Big Bang.

=== Episode Two: The End ===
This episode explores the theories of the big crunch, the big rip and the big freeze, that are postulated by physicists as possible fates for the universe. Al-Khalili indicates that the difficulty in understanding this is our limited ability to comprehend something of such immensity both physically and philosophically. So, rather than suggesting an answer, he provides the historical background for how we came to know what we know, such as how elements are forged inside stars and how gravity provides the key to the fate of the universe, and what we don't know, such as the nature of dark matter and dark energy.

== Reception ==
Jack Seale, writing for The Guardian, commends the Al-Khalili for, "his usual mix of spectacular locations, clear explanations, a few gags and the stories of scientists who made crucial breakthroughs." Gary Rose, writing for RadioTimes however points out that while Al-Khalili is "as watchable as ever", this series, unlike his earlier series Atom, covers well-trodden ground and while there are "oodles of graphs and stats," which he explains, "with seemingly effortless lucidity," regular viewers of Horizon, "might be immune to the barrage of cosmic stats."
