= Jim Al-Khalili =

British theoretical physicist, author and broadcaster

Jim Al-Khalili CBE FRS HonFREng HonFInstP
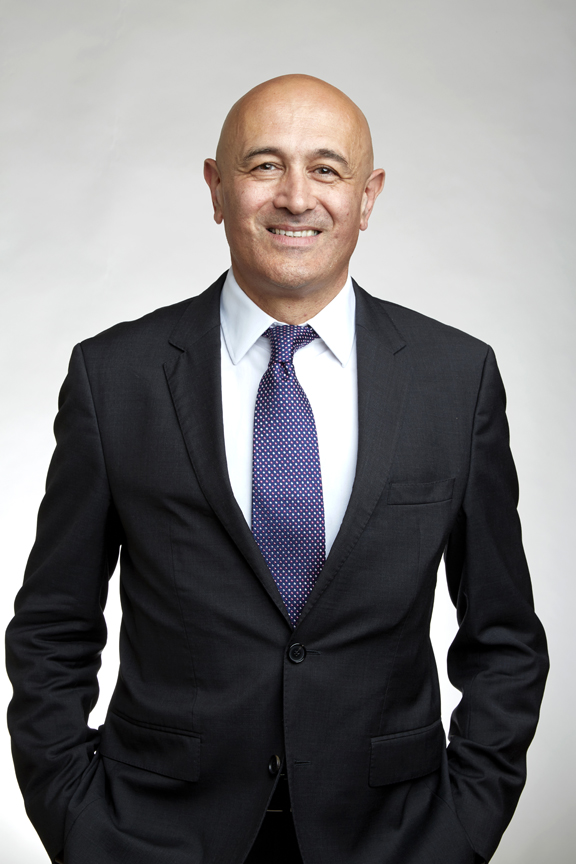
- Al-Khalili at the Royal Society admissions day for new fellows in 2018
- Born: Jameel Sadik Al-Khalili; 20 September 1962 (age 64); Baghdad, Iraq
- Citizenship: United Kingdom
- Education: Priory School, Portsmouth; University of Surrey (BSc, PhD)
- Known for: The Life Scientific
- Spouse(s): Julie Al-Khalili, née Frampton
- Awards: Michael Faraday Prize (2007); Kelvin Medal and Prize (2011); Stephen Hawking Medal (2016); Wilkins–Bernal–Medawar Medal (2020)
- Scientific career
- Fields: Nuclear physics; Quantum mechanics; Quantum biology
- Workplaces: University of Surrey (academic); University College London (postdoctoral researcher); Humanists UK (president, 2013–2016; vice-president); BBC (broadcaster)
- Thesis: Intermediate Energy Deuteron Elastic Scattering from Nuclei in a Three-Body Model (1989)
- Jim Al-Khalili's voice Recorded February 2010 from the BBC Radio 4 programme Desert Island Discs
- Website: jimal-khalili.com; www.surrey.ac.uk/people/jim-al-khalili

Jameel Sadik "Jim" Al-Khalili (born 20 September 1962) is a British theoretical physicist, author and science populariser. He is a distinguished professor emeritus of physics at the University of Surrey, where his research has covered nuclear reaction theory, quantum biology and the foundations of quantum mechanics. He is a regular broadcaster and presenter of science programmes on BBC radio and television. He hosts the long-running BBC Radio 4 series The Life Scientific, which began in 2011.

Al-Khalili is a past president of the British Science Association (2018–2019) and of Humanists UK (2013–2016). His awards for science communication include the Royal Society Michael Faraday Prize, the Institute of Physics Kelvin Medal and Prize and the Stephen Hawking Medal for Science Communication.

== Early life and education ==
Al-Khalili was born in Baghdad in 1962. His father, who was from Najaf, was an Iraqi Air Force engineer with Arab heritage, and his English mother was a librarian. Al-Khalili settled permanently in the United Kingdom in 1979.

After retaking his A-levels, he studied physics at the University of Surrey and graduated with a Bachelor of Science degree in 1986. He stayed on at Surrey to pursue a Doctor of Philosophy degree in nuclear reaction theory, which he obtained in 1989.

== Career and research ==
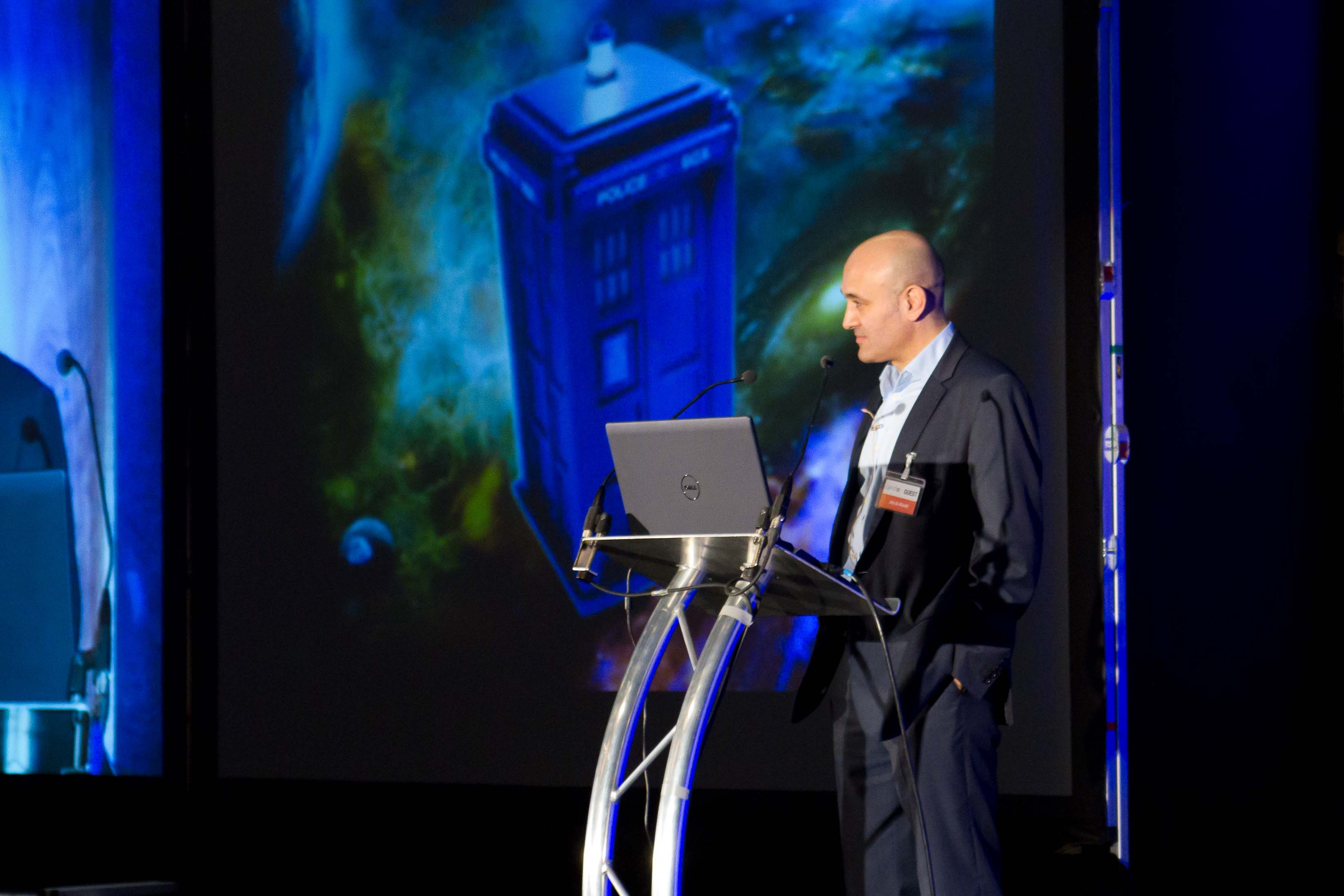
Al-Khalili talking about determinism at QED 2011

In 1989, Al-Khalili was awarded a Science and Engineering Research Council (SERC) postdoctoral fellowship at University College London. He returned to Surrey in 1991 and was appointed a lecturer in 1992. In 1994, he received a five-year Engineering and Physical Sciences Research Council (EPSRC) Advanced Research Fellowship. His research focused on nuclear reaction theory and mathematical models of exotic atomic nuclei.

From October 1999 to September 2000, he was an adjunct professor at Michigan State University.

In 2005, he was appointed to a personal chair in physics and Surrey's first chair in public engagement in science. He also held an EPSRC Senior Media Fellowship.

He held a Distinguished Chair in Physics at Surrey. In 2018, he helped establish Surrey's Leverhulme Quantum Biology Doctoral Training Centre, supported by a £1 million grant from the Leverhulme Trust. The university described it as the world's first doctoral training centre in quantum biology. He co-directed the centre with Johnjoe McFadden from 2018 to 2024.

In 2024, he took early retirement from his academic role at Surrey and became Distinguished Professor Emeritus of Physics.

=== Research ===
==== Nuclear physics ====
Al-Khalili obtained his PhD in 1989 in nuclear reaction theory from the University of Surrey. The specific problem he tackled was to interpret new experimental data from the Saclay Laboratory in France on the high-energy scattering of a polarised beam of deuterons in order to better understand the reaction mechanisms involved. He developed a few-body scattering model to analyse the measured observables and investigate the tensor terms in the scattering interaction. His calculations showed that higher-order scattering terms in which the deuteron is excited to an intermediate singlet spin state were important for reproducing the vector and tensor analysing powers within the model. A deuteron is a nucleus consisting of a proton and a neutron; few-body models treat the interacting constituents separately rather than representing the nucleus as a single object.

During his PhD, he also collaborated with M. Kawai of Kyushu University, J. A. Tostevin and R. C. Johnson on the effects of Pauli-principle-induced breakup on deuteron scattering. With E. D. Cooper of Ohio State University, he studied the Schrödinger reduction of the Dirac equation in a non-relativistic parameterisation of the proton–nucleus optical potential.

For his first postdoctoral position, Al-Khalili was awarded a two-year SERC fellowship (1989–1991) to work at University College London with Colin Wilkin. With Wilkin and M. B. Barbaro, he modelled eta-meson production via the reaction ^{6}Li(p,η)^{7}Be. During that time he also extended his PhD work on deuteron scattering by developing a parameter-free few-body Glauber calculation incorporating full spin dependence. His related work applied a cluster-folding model to polarised lithium-6 scattering at intermediate energies.

On his return to Surrey in 1991, he became interested in relativistic wave equations, such as the Duffin–Kemmer–Petiau equation, which he applied with S. Ait-Tahar and Y. Nedjadi to alpha-particle scattering from nuclei.

It was around this time that he became interested in the field of halo nuclei, in which weakly bound neutrons extend beyond a compact nuclear core. A two-neutron halo can be modelled as a cluster of three bodies: the two neutrons in the halo and the rest of the nucleus, the core. In lithium-11, a tightly bound lithium-9 core is accompanied by two halo neutrons. The diffuse halo makes lithium-11 comparable in spatial extent to a nucleus of lead. Such a three-body structure is unusual in that none of the two-body subsystems, core–neutron or neutron–neutron, is bound. Such nuclei have been dubbed Borromean after the three interlocked Borromean rings in knot theory.

Al-Khalili extended the model he had applied to deuteron scattering to study the scattering of lithium-11. With I. J. Thompson, Tostevin and J. M. Bang of the Niels Bohr Institute, he implemented a four-body scattering model which took account of the few-body correlations in the halo. Jens Bang had been Niels Bohr's scientific assistant in 1958. This programme included studies of the dynamic polarisation potential for lithium-11 scattering, the effect of the breakup channel on its elastic scattering, and the sensitivity of reaction cross sections to halo-nucleus density distributions. He also coauthored studies of quasielastic lithium-9 scattering on carbon-12, helium-6 scattering analysed within a four-body eikonal model, elastic scattering and breakup of halo nuclei, and proton scattering from helium-6 and helium-8. With Filomena Nunes, he reviewed reaction models used to probe the structure of light exotic nuclei. Other coauthored studies examined helium-8 scattering from carbon-12, carbon-19 reaction cross sections and coupled-channel calculations of beryllium-11 breakup. His work on halo scattering also included eikonal, four-body adiabatic and nonadiabatic models.

He showed that the correlated few-body wave function for the cluster structure of halo nuclei needs to be taken into account when calculating their size. With Tostevin and Thompson, he examined how these correlations affect the interpretation of scattering experiments used to infer nuclear sizes. Their few-body treatment gave larger matter radii than those obtained from calculations that represented the nucleus only by its average density. In a 1996 analysis with Tostevin, the inferred root-mean-square matter radius of lithium-11 was 3.55 ± 0.10 femtometres, 14.5% larger than the previously tabulated value. A later review discussed their few-body treatment as a correction to methods that overestimated reaction cross sections for weakly bound nuclei. He and Tostevin also contributed work on revised halo-size determinations to a RIKEN workshop in Japan in June 1996. His further publications addressed the sizes and interactions of halo nuclei and the manifestations of halo size in scattering and reactions.

He held a NORDITA fellowship at the Niels Bohr Institute in Copenhagen from August to October 1994. In June 1996, he undertook a lecture tour of Japan that included RIKEN, Tokyo Metropolitan University, Niigata University, Osaka University and the Yukawa Institute. In 1997, he wrote The Halo at the Centre of the Atom, a brochure for the Royal Society's New Frontiers in Science exhibition.

Al-Khalili developed a reaction model for single-nucleon knockout and stripping reactions involving neutron-rich isotopes of beryllium and carbon. This work examined the spectator-core approximation, in which the core is assumed to remain unaffected while a nucleon is removed. An independent review describes his test of the approximation for a loosely bound core and reports corrections of less than 10% to the stripping cross sections. He also extended his few-body Glauber model by including non-eikonal corrections in order to apply it to lower nuclear-reaction energies.

In the early 2000s, Al-Khalili worked with the nuclear theory group at TRIUMF Lab in Canada on radioactive-decay studies of nuclei, in particular modelling proton emission from nuclei on the proton drip line. He made research visits to the laboratory in the summers of 2002, 2003 and 2004. With Carlo Barbieri, Jutta Escher, Byron K. Jennings and Jean-Marc Sparenberg, he developed a many-body treatment of proton emission and examined how spectroscopic factors enter the interpretation of decay widths. He also coauthored a TRIUMF-ISAC study of the beta decay of lithium-11. The study's data suggested that a halo neutron could survive in a halo-like configuration in the daughter system. With Koji Arai, he subsequently studied electromagnetic transitions between excited states of beryllium-10; their calculations supported a neutron-halo interpretation of its weakly bound 2− state. Further publications and conference contributions addressed many-body and two-potential approaches to proton emission. His related coauthored work covered the beta decay of lithium-11 and high-resolution gamma-ray spectroscopy at TRIUMF-ISAC.

His coauthored studies of nuclei near the proton drip line included rhenium-159 and tantalum-155, decay patterns of newly identified nuclides, and the discovery of tungsten-157 and osmium-161. He also coauthored a study of single-particle structure beyond the proton drip line.

During this time, he also collaborated with Qiang Zhao, developing a quark model for meson photoproduction in which the quark degrees of freedom are explicitly introduced through an effective chiral Lagrangian for the quark–meson coupling. With Johnson, they applied the model to pion photoproduction on the deuteron. With P. L. Cole, Zhao and Al-Khalili also studied vector-meson photoproduction through the vector meson's radiative decay channel. Work by Zhao and Al-Khalili on the hypothetical Θ+ pentaquark included a proposal to use a double-polarisation observable to distinguish possible parity assignments. Other work with Zhao and colleagues concerned phi- and K*-meson photoproduction, pion photoproduction on nucleons and contributions to the Gerasimov–Drell–Hearn sum rule.

His other scattering studies included non-eikonal corrections for spin-one particles and tensor-exchange and spin–spin interactions in nucleon–nucleus scattering. He also examined three-body effects in deuteron-induced charge-exchange reactions. His reviews and conference contributions have addressed weakly bound nuclei, halo structure and reactions, and the wider field of nuclear physics.

He also coauthored a study of the potential for British research into radioactive-waste transmutation and wrote about nuclear-waste management for Physics World.

His coauthored work in nuclear astrophysics included the three-body spectrum of carbon-18 in relation to r-process nucleosynthesis, a conceptual design for the ELISe electron–ion scattering experiment at FAIR, and an overview of nuclear astrophysics with radioactive ions at FAIR.

In 2019, Al-Khalili, M. J. Dinmore, N. K. Timofeyuk and Johnson studied induced three-body effects in deuteron-induced neutron-transfer reactions. Their model included interactions between the neutron and proton mediated by excitation of the target nucleus, and was applied to calcium-40 reactions. In a 2020 study with Timofeyuk and Dinmore, he examined how three-nucleon forces affect the deuteron–target interaction and calculated reaction cross sections.

In 2021, Dinmore, Timofeyuk and Al-Khalili investigated uncertainties in models of transfer reactions used to study processes relevant to stellar nucleosynthesis. For the reactions studied, the calculated uncertainties were up to 40% at a deuteron energy of 12 MeV and could reach 100% at around 60 MeV.

With Yang Hong Li and Paul Stevenson, Al-Khalili also investigated quantum computing methods for nuclear structure calculations. Their 2024 study used quantum imaginary-time evolution to solve nuclear Hartree–Fock equations for helium-4 with a simplified interaction. On a simulated quantum computer, the method reproduced the results of the corresponding classical algorithm. A subsequent paper extended the approach to coupled non-linear Schrödinger equations for oxygen-16 and examined limitations of the quantum algorithm.

==== Quantum biology ====
What began as a side interest in the late 1990s developed into a sustained research programme in quantum biology. Al-Khalili collaborated with microbiologist Johnjoe McFadden at Surrey on developing a proton-tunnelling model of a type of genetic mutation in Escherichia coli, publishing an early speculative paper with McFadden in 1999. The model considered whether proton tunnelling in DNA and interactions with the surrounding environment could affect mutation probabilities. He gave an invited talk on quantum superpositions in biological systems at the Quantum Origins of Life workshop at NASA Ames in September–October 2003. They later contributed a chapter on quantum coherence and the origin of self-replicating molecules to the book Quantum Aspects of Life (2008). The volume grew out of a 2003 NASA workshop at Ames in California and was edited by Derek Abbott, Paul C. W. Davies and Arun K. Pati, with a foreword by Roger Penrose. McFadden and Al-Khalili subsequently coauthored a historical account of the origins of quantum biology, and Al-Khalili was among the authors of a later review of developments in the field. He also wrote an overview of the quantum-biology session at the 2017 IUPAB and EBSA congresses.

Al-Khalili has described quantum biology as having a sometimes controversial history. In a 2023 conference abstract, he challenged the community to answer a fundamental question first laid out by Erwin Schrödinger in What Is Life?. Al-Khalili expressed the question as follows:

whether life not only knows about quantum mechanics, but whether it has evolved the ability to utilise it in order to have, or prevent it from having, a functional role in biology that is distinct from its role in inanimate matter of equivalent complexity.

Working at Surrey with Marco Sacchi and students Louie Slocombe and Max Winokan, he developed a model of point mutations in DNA by solving a Markovian master equation for an open quantum system, with proton tunnelling in a double potential well used to simulate transitions between hydrogen-bonded DNA bases. In 2015, his research programme included work with A. D. Godbeer and P. D. Stevenson on proton tunnelling in the adenine–thymine base pair. With Slocombe and Sacchi, he subsequently compared quantum and classical effects on Watson–Crick tautomerism in both adenine–thymine and guanine–cytosine base pairs.

In 2022, Al-Khalili, Slocombe and Sacchi published a theoretical study of proton tunnelling in guanine–cytosine DNA base pairs. Their model incorporated interactions with the molecular environment and predicted rapid proton transfer between the usual base-pair configuration and an alternative, tautomeric form that could lead to copying errors. The paper noted that experimental measurements of the relevant double-proton-transfer rates were not yet available. Coverage in Physics World described the work as computer modelling and identified questions still to be answered about mutation and DNA repair.

Slocombe, Winokan, Al-Khalili and Sacchi also modelled proton transfer as DNA strands separate, finding that separation could stabilise alternative guanine–cytosine tautomers. Their related studies examined quantum tunnelling in guanine–thymine wobble misincorporation and tautomerisation mechanisms in adenine–thymine base pairs during strand separation. Subsequent multiscale simulations examined the bacterial PcrA helicase and suggested that its local protein environment could suppress the formation of potentially mutagenic forms.

Related work with Sapphire Lally, Nick Werren and Andrea Rocco derived a master equation for non-Markovian quantum Brownian motion and examined the emergence of lateral coherences.

Together with McFadden, Al-Khalili co-wrote the popular-science book Life on the Edge (2014), which surveyed quantum biology. His University of Surrey profile reported that translations of the book into 16 languages were under way. Reviewing it for Physics World, physicist Marta Varela distinguished its experimentally supported examples from its speculative proposals about mutation and the origin of life.

==== Quantum foundations ====
In 2021, Surrey announced a project led by Al-Khalili and Andrea Rocco on quantum thermodynamics, quantum biology and the arrow of time, funded by the John Templeton Foundation. In a 2024 paper with philosopher Eddy Keming Chen, he examined the hypothesis that low quantum entanglement in the early universe could explain the direction of quantum decoherence. Quantum decoherence is the process by which a system loses quantum coherence through interaction with its environment.

With A. D. Godbeer and P. D. Stevenson, he compared environment-induced dephasing with von Neumann measurements in a proton-tunnelling model and examined the associated quantum Zeno and anti-Zeno effects.

With Lester Buxton, Marc-Thomas Russo and Rocco, Al-Khalili also developed a model of quantum Brownian motion in which the surrounding environment is itself damped. Their 2023 preprint examined how this damping affects decoherence and transfer between the wells of a double-well potential. In calculations that kept the potential fixed, increasing environmental damping slowed decoherence.

In 2024, Al-Khalili and Ali Raza Mirza studied quantum metrology using a two-level quantum probe coupled to a reservoir of spins. Their model indicated that initial correlations between the probe and reservoir could improve the theoretical precision of estimates of temperature and coupling strength. In a separate 2024 preprint, they compared preparation of the probe's initial state by a projective measurement with preparation by a unitary pulse, and investigated the consequences for estimating the same environmental parameters.

=== Broadcasting ===
Al-Khalili regularly presents science programmes on television and radio and also writes articles for the British press. In 2005, he co-presented the Channel 4 documentary The Riddle of Einstein's Brain, produced by Icon Films. In 2007, he presented Atom, a three-part series on BBC Four about the history of scientific understanding of the atom and atomic physics. This was followed by a special archive edition of Horizon, "The Big Bang".

In early 2009, Al-Khalili presented the three-part BBC Four series Science and Islam, which examined the development of scientific knowledge in the Islamic world between the eighth and fourteenth centuries. He has also contributed to BBC One's Bang Goes the Theory. In 2010, he presented Chemistry: A Volatile History, a BBC documentary on the history of chemistry.

In 2011, Al-Khalili hosted a three-part documentary series on BBC Four entitled Shock and Awe: The Story of Electricity. In 2012, he presented the BBC Two Horizon special "The Hunt for the Higgs", about the search for the Higgs boson at CERN.

Al-Khalili was among the experts interviewed in the Philomena Cunk mockumentaries Cunk on Earth (2022) and Cunk on Life (2024).

Al-Khalili presented the BBC series Secrets of the Brain, which began airing in September 2025 and investigated theories of the evolution of the human brain.

In October 2011, he began presenting the BBC Radio 4 interview programme The Life Scientific. The first episode of the series featured his interview with Paul Nurse. Guests have included Bill Gates and Anthony Fauci. In 2019, Al-Khalili was himself interviewed on the programme by Adam Rutherford.

At the Voice of the Listener & Viewer awards for programmes broadcast in 2013, held in May 2014, The Life Scientific won Best Radio Programme and Al-Khalili won Best Individual Contribution to Radio. The programme won Best Radio News and Factual Programme in the awards for 2025, presented in April 2026.

At the University of Surrey, Al-Khalili has also hosted a "Jim meets..." interview series, which is published on the university's YouTube channel. Guests have included David Attenborough, Robert Winston, Brian Cox and Rowan Williams.

== Professional and public service ==
=== Current roles ===
- Vice-president of Humanists UK
- Trustee and Royal Commissioner, Royal Commission for the Exhibition of 1851 (2022–)
- Member of the Royal Society Public Engagement Committee (2022–)
- Member of the European Advisory Board of Princeton University Press (2022–)
- President of the Blackham Society, Humanists UK (2016–)
- Member of the Scientific Advisory Council of the Foundational Questions Institute (2022–)
- Member of the advisory board of the St Cross Centre for the History and Philosophy of Physics, University of Oxford (2021–)
- Patron of the Daphne Jackson Trust
- Patron of Humanists UK
- Patron of the National Education Museum
- Patron of the UK Metric Association
- Patron of the Guildford Institute

=== Former roles ===
- Member of the Royal Society Medals and Awards Search Panel
- Member of the judging panel of the Queen Elizabeth Prize for Engineering (2017–2023)
- Trustee and council member of the Institute of Physics (2016–2020)
- Trustee and board member of the Campaign for Science and Engineering (2014–2020)
- Trustee and council member of the British Science Association (2006–2012)
- President of the British Science Association (2018–2019)
- President of the British Science Association Physics and Astronomy Section (2010–2011)
- President of the British Humanist Association (now Humanists UK; 2013–2016)
- Chair of the Nuclear and Particle Physics Division of the Institute of Physics (2001–2005)
- Member of the British Council Science and Engineering Advisory Group (2007–2011)
- Vice-president of the British Science Association (2008–2011)
- Member of the Royal Society Education Committee (2016–2021)
- External examiner for the Open University Department of Physics and Astronomy (2006–2012)
- Recorder for the British Science Association Physics and Astronomy Section (2002–2006)
- Honorary secretary of the Institute of Physics Nuclear Physics Group (1996–2001)
- Member of the Research Excellence Framework chemistry and physics sub-panels assessing impact (2013–2014)
- Member of the Royal Society Vision for Science and Mathematics Education Committee (2011–2014)
- Judge for the Art Fund Prize for museums and galleries (2011 and 2012)
- Member of the Royal Society Equality and Diversity Panel (2009–2012)
- Member of the EPSRC Societal Issues Panel (2008–2011)
- Judge for the Samuel Johnson Prize for non-fiction (2007)

== Awards and honours ==
=== State honours ===
- 2008 – Officer of the Order of the British Empire (OBE), in the 2008 Birthday Honours
- 2021 – Commander of the Order of the British Empire (CBE), in the 2021 Birthday Honours, for services to science and public engagement in STEM

=== Awards and prize nominations ===
- 2000 – Institute of Physics Public Awareness of Physics Award
- 2007 – Michael Faraday Prize for science communication
- 2011 – Kelvin Medal and Prize
- 2013 – Pathfinders shortlisted for the Warwick Prize for Writing
- 2014 – EPSRC RISE leader award
- 2016 – Inaugural winner of the Stephen Hawking Medal for Science Communication
- 2019 – Outstanding Achievement in Science and Technology at The Asian Awards
- 2020 – Wilkins–Bernal–Medawar Medal
- 2025 – Humanists UK Darwin Day Medal

=== Fellowships ===
- 2000 – Fellow of the Institute of Physics
- 2007 – Honorary Fellow of the British Science Association
- 2018 – Fellow of the Royal Society (FRS)
- 2019 – Honorary Fellow of the Institute of Physics
- 2019 – Honorary Fellow of the Institution of Engineering and Technology
- 2023 – Honorary Fellow of the Royal Academy of Engineering
- 2024 – Fellow of the Science Museum Group

=== Honorary degrees ===
Al-Khalili has received honorary doctorates from the following universities:

- 2013 – Royal Holloway, University of London
- 2014 – University of Bradford
- 2015 – Open University
- 2015 – University of Portsmouth
- 2017 – University of York
- 2018 – University of Roehampton
- 2019 – University of St Andrews
- 2022 – Newcastle University
- 2022 – University of Birmingham
- 2025 – Cranfield University

== Named lectures ==
- On 18 October 2026, he gave a talk on time at the European Skeptics Congress in Liverpool.
- 4th World Government Summit, Dubai, 2016: "The Forgotten Legacy of Arabic Science"
- International Year of Light, The Royal Society, 2016: a lecture on light and Ibn al-Haytham
- TEDGlobal, Royal Institution, 16 June 2015: "How quantum biology might explain life's biggest questions"
- Stirling Lecture, University of Durham, 2014: "Life on the Edge: the coming of age of quantum biology"
- Hermann Bondi Lecture, Cambridge Festival of Ideas, 2014: "Life on the Edge: the coming of age of quantum biology"
- BHA Voltaire Lecture, 2014: "Lessons from the past: science and rationalism in medieval Islam"
- IET Kelvin Lecture, 2013: "Is Life Quantum Mechanical?"
- The Holyoake Lecture, 2013: "The Forgotten Legacy of Arabic Science"
- On 10 May 2012, he gave a lecture on Alan Turing at the University of Edinburgh. The lecture was jointly organised by the Royal Society of Edinburgh and the university's School of Informatics, with support from the Gifford Lectureship Committee.
- 6th Andrew Chamblin Memorial Lecture, Cambridge, 2012: "On the Shoulders of Eastern Giants: The Forgotten Contribution of Medieval Physicists"
- JD Bernal Lecture, Birkbeck College, 2011: "The hidden story of medieval Arabic science"
- Michael Faraday Prize Lecture, Royal Society, 2008: "The House of Wisdom and the legacy of Arabic Science"
- Invited speaker at Cambridge Union, 2013
- Invited speaker at Oxford Union, 2026
- Royal Institution Friday Evening Discourse speaker, 2003, 2013 and 2025
- Institute of Physics Schools and Colleges Lecturer, 1998: lectures on black holes, wormholes and time travel

== Personal life ==
Al-Khalili lives in Southsea, Portsmouth, with his wife, Julie. They have two adult children. He has two grandchildren. He is a keen supporter of Leeds United, which he has followed since the early 1970s. He visits Elland Road when he can.

Al-Khalili is an atheist and a humanist. He has remarked, "As the son of a Protestant Christian mother and a Shia Muslim father, I have nevertheless ended up without a religious bone in my body."

== Documentaries ==
Al-Khalili has presented, narrated or appeared in the following documentaries:

Year	Programme	Role
2005	The Riddle of Einstein's Brain	Co-presenter
2007	Atom	Presenter
2008	Lost Horizons: The Big Bang	Presenter
2009	Science and Islam	Presenter
2010	Genius of Britain: The Scientists Who Changed the World	Contributor
2010	The Secret Life of Chaos	Presenter
2010	Chemistry: A Volatile History	Presenter
2011	Everything and Nothing	Presenter
2011	Shock and Awe: The Story of Electricity	Presenter
2012	The Hunt for the Higgs (Horizon)	Presenter
2012	Order and Disorder	Presenter
2013	Light and Dark	Presenter
2014	The Secrets of Quantum Physics	Presenter
2015	Britain's Nuclear Secrets: Inside Sellafield	Presenter
2016	The Beginning and End of the Universe	Presenter
2017	Britain's Nuclear Bomb: The Inside Story	Presenter
2017	Gravity and Me: The Force That Shapes Our Lives	Presenter
2018	The Joy of AI	Presenter
2019	Breakthrough: The Ideas That Changed the World	Host
2020	Secrets of the Solar System	Narrator
2022	Secrets of Size: Atoms to Supergalaxies	Presenter
2025	Secrets of the Brain	Presenter

== Publications ==
Al-Khalili's publications are indexed by Google Scholar and Scopus. His published books include:

- Al-Khalili, Jim (1999), Black Holes, Wormholes and Time Machines, Institute of Physics Publishing, ISBN 0-7503-0560-6
- Mackintosh, Ray; Al-Khalili, Jim; Jonson, Björn; Peña, Teresa (2001), Nucleus: A Trip into the Heart of Matter, Canopus Publishing, ISBN 0-9537868-3-8
- Al-Khalili, Jim (2004), Quantum: A Guide for the Perplexed, Weidenfeld & Nicolson, OCLC 56344558
- Al-Khalili, Jim (2010), Pathfinders: The Golden Age of Arabic Science, Penguin, ISBN 978-0-14-196501-7
  - Published in the United States as The House of Wisdom: How Arabic Science Saved Ancient Knowledge and Gave Us the Renaissance (2011).
- Al-Khalili, Jim (2012), Paradox: The Nine Greatest Enigmas in Science, Bantam, ISBN 978-0-593-06930-1
- Al-Khalili, Jim; McFadden, Johnjoe (2014), Life on the Edge: The Coming of Age of Quantum Biology, Transworld Digital, ISBN 978-1-4464-8815-7
- Al-Khalili, Jim (26 January 2017), Quantum Mechanics, Ladybird Expert, illus. Jeff Cummins & Dan Newman, London: Michael Joseph, ISBN 978-0-7181-8627-2
- Al-Khalili, Jim (7 February 2019), Gravity, Ladybird Expert, illus. Jeff Cummins, London: Michael Joseph, ISBN 978-0-7181-8903-7
- Al-Khalili, Jim (10 March 2020), The World According to Physics, Princeton University Press, ISBN 978-0-691-18230-8
- Al-Khalili, Jim (5 April 2022), The Joy of Science, Princeton University Press, ISBN 978-0-691-21157-2
- Al-Khalili, Jim (1 September 2026), On Time: The Physics That Makes the Universe Tick, Princeton University Press, ISBN 978-0-691-26703-6

=== Articles and reviews ===
His shorter publications cover scientific software, nuclear halos and changing nuclear shell structure, time travel and wormholes, and other topics in modern physics. He has also published historical articles on science in the Muslim world, optics and Faraday's work on electromagnetic induction. His interviews and coauthored essays have addressed science communication.

=== Edited volumes ===
- Al-Khalili, Jim, ed. (3 November 2016), Aliens: Science Asks: Is There Anyone Out There?, Profile Books, ISBN 978-1-78125-681-7
- Al-Khalili, Jim, ed. (5 October 2017), What's Next? Even Scientists Can't Predict the Future – or Can They?, Profile Books, ISBN 978-1-78125-895-8
- Al-Khalili, Jim; Roeckl, Ernst, eds. (2004), The Euroschool Lectures on Physics with Exotic Beams, Vol. I, Lecture Notes in Physics, Springer, doi:10.1007/b98790, ISBN 978-3-540-22399-3
- Al-Khalili, Jim; Roeckl, Ernst, eds. (2006), The Euroschool Lectures on Physics with Exotic Beams, Vol. II, Lecture Notes in Physics, Springer, doi:10.1007/b11743651, ISBN 978-3-540-33786-7
- Al-Khalili, Jim; Roeckl, Ernst, eds. (2008), The Euroschool Lectures on Physics with Exotic Beams, Vol. III, Lecture Notes in Physics, Springer, doi:10.1007/978-3-540-85839-3, ISBN 978-3-540-85838-6

=== Consultant editor ===
- Bizony, Piers (2004), Invisible Worlds: Exploring the Unseen, Consultant editor: Jim Al-Khalili, Weidenfeld & Nicolson, ISBN 978-0-297-84342-9

=== Contributions ===
He has contributed to the following publications:

- Ridpath, Ian, ed. (2001), Collins Encyclopedia of the Universe, Contributing author: Jim Al-Khalili, HarperCollins, ISBN 978-0-00-710585-4
- Al-Khalili, J. S.; Tostevin, J. A. (2002), "Few-Body Models of Nuclear Reactions", in Pike, Roy; Sabatier, Pierre (eds.), Scattering: Scattering and Inverse Scattering in Pure and Applied Science, Academic Press, pp. 1373–1392, doi:10.1016/B978-012613760-6/50074-7, ISBN 978-0-12-613760-6
- Al-Khalili, Jim; McFadden, Johnjoe (2008), "Quantum Coherence and the Search for the First Replicator", in Abbott, Derek; Davies, Paul C. W.; Pati, Arun K. (eds.), Quantum Aspects of Life, Imperial College Press, pp. 33–49, doi:10.1142/9781848162556_0003
- Parsons, Paul, ed. (2009), 30-second Theories: The 50 Most Thought-provoking Theories in Science, Each Explained in Half a Minute, Contributing author: Jim Al-Khalili, Fall River Press, ISBN 978-1-4351-0956-8

=== Fiction ===
Jim Al-Khalili has written one science fiction novel:

- Al-Khalili, Jim (18 April 2019), Sunfall, London: Bantam Press, ISBN 978-0-593-07742-9
