= Fight for Life (TV series) =

- Country of origin: United Kingdom
- No. of episodes: 6

Production
- Running time: 60 minutes

Original release
- Network: BBC One
- Release: 9 July – 13 August 2007

'Fight for Life' is a British television series which explores the human body and its fight for survival in life-threatening situations using new technology, with computer-generated imagery and specially shot footage. The series explains the six stages of life: Birth, Childhood, Teenagers, Prime of Life, The Middle Years and The Final Years.

== Episodes ==
=== Birth ===
This episode explains that birth is the riskiest time in life and the process of a woman delivering a baby and how both the woman and the child are put at risk in this complex journey. It features a two-hour-old baby already facing death who has Meconium Aspiration Syndrome as a result of inhaling excrement at or before birth. The programme also follows a woman who needs a caesarean because her baby's in a breech position but the operation goes horribly wrong as the umbilical cord gets trapped around the baby's neck.

=== Childhood ===
As the body develops it is always at risk of deadly diseases, but children's bodies have certain features that bring them back from the brink of death. This episode follows a boy with malformed heart which could collapse at any time. The only way to save him is a heart transplant, a battle against time as the body can only survive so long on an artificial heart. A different patient suffers a major asthma attack and his body has to depend on its own immune system for the fight for survival to unblock his airways.

=== Teenagers ===
As teenagers take massive risks at this time, it can be a very dangerous time in life, in the middle of childhood and adulthood. One patient is a victim of two potentially fatal stab wounds - one of which penetrated the lining of a lung. Surgeons perform an immediate lung drain to relieve pressure on the lung and to stop difficulty of breathing. Two girls are rushed to A&E after alcohol poisoning and using computer imagery, explores the damage done. Another patient has broken two bones in his foot severing a major artery and doctors battle to save his foot with the remaining blood vessels in his foot.

=== Prime of Life ===
At a time when our bodies are at its strongest, the programme follows a woman with a congenital heart condition as she strains to deliver a baby and her body stretched to the limit. Another woman has been hit by a car and left with life-threatening injuries. Medics battle in the vital first hour to keep her alive. Scott, another patient, has incurable liver disease. His only option is a live donation from his cousin and 17-hour operation as it is explored with amazing computer graphics.

=== The Middle Years ===
When middle-aged things start to go wrong. A patient has a life-threatening aneurysm in a major blood vessel as it decays so much, it could burst at any time, which would kill him. Doctors battle against time to replace it with an artificial one. Christine has dangerous carbon dioxide levels in her blood, related to years of smoking, which is poisoning her brain. Medics are not certain if they can save her in time. John has a heart failure, leaving him with a potentially fatal weak heart. His only option is a robotically inserted pacemaker. A stroke patient's brain is explored to explain why he had a stroke and the process to attempt to make him stroke-free in the future.

=== The Final Years ===
Despite the body's slowing responses, the body can still fight back, explained using computer graphics. Geoffrey is rushed to A&E with a rice-grain sized blood clot in one of the veins feeding his heart as he suffers a series of cardiac arrests. Vera seems dazed and confused with a suspected head injury after a fall at home. She is rushed to X-ray to assess the damage. Len arrives at A&E with severe stomach pains. He is diagnosed with a necrotic bowel which means the blood supply has been cut off and the tissue is dying. He requires urgent surgery whilst he is already suffering with epilepsy, arteritis, a slow heartbeat and vascular disease. A consultant informs him that there is a very slim chance of survival after surgery. Eighty-three-year-old Len chooses not to have surgery and to die from the bowel infection overtaking his body. His blood pressure drops and his breathing becomes shallower and finally his lungs, followed by his heart and Brain shut down for good, ending his fight for life.

== International broadcasting ==
Country	TV Network(s)	Series Premiere	Weekly Schedule
AUS	Channel Seven	August 23, 2007	Thursday 8:30pm
