= Primeval series 3 =

2009 series of British sci-fi programme

Primeval
- Series 3
- DVD box set cover art
- Starring: Douglas Henshall; Jason Flemyng; Andrew-Lee Potts; Lucy Brown; Hannah Spearritt; Juliet Aubrey; Ben Miller; Ben Mansfield; Laila Rouass; Belinda Stewart-Wilson
- No. of episodes: 10

Release
- Original network: ITV
- Original release: 28 March – 6 June 2009

Series chronology
- ← Previous; Series 2 Next → Series 4

The third series of the British science fiction programme Primeval began on 28 March 2009 and concluded on 6 June 2009 after airing ten episodes. Primeval follows a team of scientists tasked with investigating the appearance of temporal anomalies across the United Kingdom through which prehistoric and futuristic creatures enter the present. The third series featured dramatic changes to the main cast, seeing the departure of lead actors Douglas Henshall, Lucy Brown and Juliet Aubrey and the introduction of several new lead characters, played by Jason Flemyng, Laila Rouass and Ben Mansfield.

During the production of the third series, the production team saw it as the most ambitious series of Primeval yet, owing to its greater length (the first and second series being six and seven episodes, respectively), its changes and surprises, and its more concentrated effort to have the featured creatures to be unique from what had been shown before and to serve story functions. The departure of Douglas Henshall, who played the main character Nick Cutter, forced extensive revisions to the intended storyline which left several plot threads ultimately unresolved. The visual effects of the third series were improved over the two preceding series owing to new techniques and technologies, as well as the effects team being granted more production time.

During its initial broadcast, the third series was accompanied with extensive online integration, including the online game Primeval Evolved wherein players could become active participants in the storyline. The series was watched by an average of around five million viewers, down from the over six million of the previous series but still considered a success. Critical reception of the third series was highly positive, with critics praising its more extensive characterisation, that the actions of characters had repercussions, and its greater focus on tension and suspense. Several reviewers considered the third series to be the strongest of Primeval yet and some favourably compared it to the Jon Pertwee era of Doctor Who (1970–1974) on the basis of the suspenseful storylines and new team dynamic. Despite its success, Primeval was cancelled shortly after the broadcast of the third series for financial reasons, though it would ultimately be revived a few months later with a fourth series being broadcast in 2011.

== Episodes ==
No. overall	No. in series	Episode	Directed by	Written by	Original release date	UK viewers (millions)
14	1	Episode 1 "Crocodile Fears"	Tony Mitchell	Steve Bailie	28 March 2009	5.89
An exhibition of ancient Egyptian relics comes to the British Museum and an anomaly opens in a mysterious monument called the "Sun Cage". A Pristichampsus, believed in Ancient Egypt to be the demon Ammut, emerges and proceeds to wreak havoc in London. Nick Cutter, Abby Maitland, Jenny Lewis, and new security chief, Captain Becker, pursue it through the city while Connor Temple and new recruit, Egyptologist Sarah Page try to stop more creatures coming through, and make some interesting discoveries about the anomalies in the process. Meanwhile, James Lester encounters a new adversary: the devious and ambitious Christine Johnson, who is after a strange artifact that Helen Cutter has stolen.
15	2	Episode 2 "Haunted House"	Cilla Ware	James Moran	4 April 2009	4.94
Three teenage boys break into a house and a “Gremlin” (a future beast able to camouflage itself in any environment) attacks them. Only one boy manages to escape alive. Fourteen years later, in the present day, Cutter predicts an anomaly will appear in the same house the boys were killed. He sends Jenny, Abby and Connor to investigate. However, their efforts are thwarted by the creature and the attentions of detective Danny Quinn, who is investigating his brother's disappearance 14 years before. Meanwhile, Cutter, Becker and Sarah are caught off-guard when Helen's forces attempt to infiltrate the ARC.
16	3	Episode 3 "Medical Mayhem"	Tony Mitchell	Mike Cullen	11 April 2009	3.28
An anomaly opens at the West London Hospital, causing small Diictodon to emerge. They promptly chew through the power cables, cutting the power to the building. Cutter, Abby, Connor and Becker arrive to investigate and evacuate the building as does journalist Mick Harper from Evening News HQ, who wants to get evidence of the creatures to expose to the public. However, they return to find Helen and her Cleaner Replica troops (including a clone of Cutter) have taken over the ARC, so they can interrogate the real Cutter about the artifact. As a bomb blast tears the ARC apart and the team battle for survival, Helen declares that she must stop the ARC'S research from destroying the world at any cost… even if it means killing her husband.
17	4	Episode 4 "A Gigantic Problem"	Mark Everest	Paul Mousley	18 April 2009	4.97
Mick Harper steals an anomaly detector from Jenny's car and uses it to track down an anomaly at an airport, bringing a documentary presenter with him to identify any creatures that come through. Yet when a Giganotosaurus comes through the anomaly, the team has to not only stop the enormous rampaging dinosaur destroying the airport and a nearby aircraft, but prevent the journalists broadcasting its existence to the world. Danny Quinn appears and helps them, then refuses to leave.
18	5	Episode 5 "Future Epidemic"	Mark Everest	Catherine Linstrum and Paul Mousley	25 April 2009	5.20
Danny Quinn breaks into the ARC and is drafted in to help the team when a fast-growing flesh-eating fungus from the future is transferred to the present and infects a businessman, Sir Richard Bentley. Danny arrives with flamethrowers to try and burn Bentley as he is already infected not realising fire does not work. The team manage to bring the creature back to the ARC to destroy it, where Jenny is trapped in the freezing cold main operations area with it and forced to fight for her life. After recent discoveries and her near-death experience, Jenny decides that she's had enough: she resigns from her job at the ARC, leaving Danny in charge of the team.
19	6	Episode 6 "For the Birds"	Cilla Ware	Paul Farrell	2 May 2009	5.27
With Jenny's departure and Cutter's death, Danny Quinn is made the new leader of the team. When Christine Johnson and her soldiers take over the ARC in search of the artifact, the team escape to an old cabin on Ministry of Defence property within a minefield which has been abandoned since the 1930s. As Johnson ousts Lester and imposes her will on the ARC staff, Becker must find a way to defeat her. At the same time, with no weapons but their own initiative, Danny, Connor, Abby and Sarah have to find a way to defend themselves, not only from Johnson's soldiers, but also from a pack of rampaging terror birds that emerge from a nearby anomaly.
20	7	Episode 7 "Dragon Tales"	Richard Curson Smith	Andrew Rattenbury	9 May 2009	5.34
A dragon-like Dracorex comes through an anomaly, trying to escape from a 14th-century knight who believes he is hunting a real dragon. The team are forced to find and save the life of the Dracorex, and then with the aid of medieval research by Sarah return the confused knight, who thinks he is a new Saint George, to his own time before he kills anyone out of belief they are demons and he is in hell.
21	8	Episode 8 "Oh, Brother"	Richard Curson Smith	Cameron McAllister	16 May 2009	5.13
An anomaly opens at a race car test track and a Megopteran, an insect from the future, comes through. It is carnivorous and lethal, and the team must draw on all their resources to get it back to its own time. However, things get complicated when Abby’s brother Jack decides to find out what she really does for a living, and inadvertently drives through an anomaly into the future: a post-apocalyptic world overrun by future predators. Now the team must mount a desperate rescue mission after Jack and then find a way to escape with their lives. During the rescue mission, Abby realizes something about Connor which will change both their lives forever.
22	9	Episode 9 "Herd Logic"	Matthew Thompson	Paul Farrell	23 May 2009	4.97
The team have to deal with a herd of Embolotherium from the Eocene. Danny arrives with a mysterious woman called Eve who he first saw in the future; having rescued her from Christine Johnson, they endeavour to save everyone from the stampede. When the anomaly closes, Eve opens another anomaly at a campsite to return the beasts and all are saved. Upon their return to the ARC, the team are shocked to discover that Eve is Helen Cutter in disguise, who takes Johnson hostage. Holding her at gunpoint, Helen steals the artifact, pushes Johnson through an anomaly to be killed by future predators, and vows once again to stop the ARC's work from destroying the world. The team decide they must stop Helen before she kills anyone else.
23	10	Episode 10 "The Chase Continues"	Matthew Thompson	Steve Bailie	6 June 2009	4.95
Sarah and Becker investigate an anomaly that re-opens at Johnson's HQ and end up fighting for their lives against Megopterans while Danny, Abby and Connor hunt for Helen in the future. The trio discover Helen plans to prevent the evolution of mankind in order to save the world, resulting in a chase across Cretaceous North America and into Pliocene Africa. Danny confronts Helen at the location of the human ancestor Australopithecus only to find she has poisoned a small group already. Helen delights in her apparent victory, but a dromaeosaur that followed Danny through the anomaly charges at Helen and knocks her off a cliff, killing them both. Having ensured the other hominids have survived, Danny then makes his way back to the anomaly, but it vanishes just before he reaches it.

== Cast ==
=== Main cast ===
- Douglas Henshall as Nick Cutter
- Jason Flemyng as Danny Quinn
- Andrew-Lee Potts as Connor Temple
- Lucy Brown as Jenny Lewis
- Hannah Spearritt as Abby Maitland
- Laila Rouass as Sarah Page
- Ben Mansfield as Captain Hilary Becker
- Belinda Stewart-Wilson as Christine Johnson
- Juliet Aubrey as Helen Cutter
- Ben Miller as James Lester

=== Guest cast ===
Appearing in more than one episode

- Michael Wildman as Captain Ross
- Tim Faraday as Replica Clones
- Ruth Gemmell as Katherine Kavanagh
- Ramon Tikaram as Mick Harper
- Alex McSweeney as Captain Joseph Wilder
- Robert Lowe as Jack Maitland
- Kate Magowan as Eve
- Jack Gordon as Tony

Single-episode appearances

- Regina Freedman as Marion Taylor
- Christina Catalina as Cleaning Lady
- Glyn Grimstead as Stanley Morgan
- Bertie Carvel as Ryan Mason
- Joe Prospero as Young Ryan Mason
- Jack Bence as Patrick Quinn
- Chrys Ryman as Jimmy Keal
- Polly Dartford as Emily
- Nina Toussaint-White as Melanie
- Antony Eldridge as Captain
- Nigel Marven as Documentary Presenter
- William Scott-Masson as Sir Richard Bentley
- Theo Cross as Lloyd
- Terrance Maynard as Chaffeur
- Mark Leadbetter as Mark Baker
- Tony Curran as Sir William de Mornay
- Patrick Romer as Priest
- Jordan Long as Jimmy the Barman
- Jamie Glover as Village Boy
- Brad Damon as Mike
- Rebecca Calder as Lady Elizabeth Lionel
- Tom McKay as Joe
- Marcus Onilude as Randy

== Production ==
=== Development and writing ===
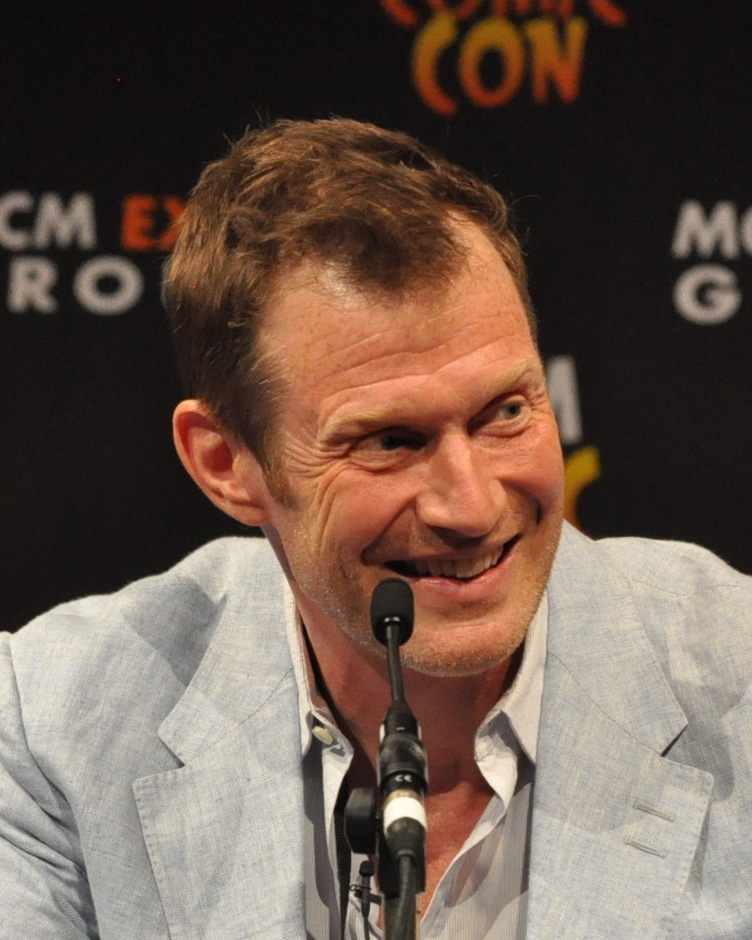
Jason Flemyng (pictured) was cast as the new lead character Danny Quinn after the departure of the previous lead actor Douglas Henshall forced extensive changes to the intended storyline

The storyline of the third series of Primeval was deeply influenced by the decision of the lead actor Douglas Henshall to leave the show. Though Henshall felt that the first series was exciting, he felt that Primeval had become more standard and a "little simplified in its ambitions" in the second series and "more of a monster-of-the-week type thing". Series co-creator Adrian Hodges had intended for Nick Cutter to have had an arc stretching throughout the third series, terminating in the final episode leaving Nick Cutter stranded in the past with his wife. Henshall's early departure from the third series meant that Cutter's intended arc and the end of his storyline in the series 3 finale had to be nearly entirely scrapped and rewritten. Though Hodges was disappointed that Henshall left the series, he also saw it as an interesting opportunity; Cutter's death in the third episode was never intended to be written but Hodges was still very proud of the episode. Nick Cutter's death was envisioned as an alternate fitting end to his and Helen Cutter's arcs and as something unexpected yet realistic and credible.

The departure of Henshall also impacted other plotlines. The third series would also have more deeply explored who Jenny Lewis was and how she had replaced Claudia Brown. (Note: Lucy Brown played the character Claudia Brown in the first series of Primeval, who in the finale was revealed to never have existed as a result of some change unwittingly made during a trip back in time. Brown returned in the second series as Jenny Lewis; only Cutter remembered Claudia Brown and only he noticed that Brown and Lewis were seemingly the same person.) It was intended to reveal that Jenny Lewis was Claudia Brown, just "evolved in a different way", and that this had happened to several people across the world. Furthermore, small timeline alterations would have slightly altered the course of evolution, causing several prehistoric animals to develop slightly differently. The storyline would have seen Cutter realise the small differences and go to change things back. Though Hodges was happy with the idea and Brown was also receptive, Henshall's departure meant that it was impossible to realise. The Claudia Brown/Jenny Lewis plotline was never fully resolved in Primeval.

Henshall was replaced as lead actor by Jason Flemyng, who played the new character Danny Quinn. The production team wished to replace Nick Cutter with a leading man who was very different; whereas Nick Cutter was an academic and driven loner who only thawed somewhat in the company of his team, Danny Quinn was a policeman with little to no expertise on prehistoric animals but a natural leader and good at making decisions and seeing the big picture. According to Hodges, whereas Henshall had "patented a kind of passionate intensity", Flemyng was "naturally very warm and outgoing", which they wanted to reflect in his character. Hodges also stated that whereas Cutter was more of a "stern patriarch", Quinn was a "firm but fair big brother".

The third series is ten episodes long, greater than both the first (six episodes) and second (seven episodes) series. The greater length was used to go off in more different directions, including playing into the idea that some mythological creatures could be the result of prehistoric animals stepping through anomalies. The choice to do ten episodes also meant that it was possible to not go through as much material as quickly as in previous series and that it was possible to create two- or three-episode stories rather than central stories throughout the series or self-contained episodes. At the time of production, Hodges considered the third series to be the most ambitious series of Primeval yet, particularly on account of its changes and surprises.

Further new characters were introduced in the third series, partly since an altered team balance was believed to be able to help keep the series refreshing. Sarah Page, played by Laila Rouass, was brought into the third series mainly as a replacement of Stephen Hart (played by James Murray in the first and second series). Page's line of work as an egyptologist was written to fit in with the theme of prehistoric creatures inspiring mythologies. Another new protagonist was the military figure Captain Hilary Becker (played by Ben Mansfield). Primeval had a key military figure in the first series, Tom Ryan (played by Mark Wakeling), put lacked one in the second series due to the producers not wanting to replace Wakeling instantly and due to a wish to see if the series could work without too much military intervention. As the series went on, the production team felt that a lack up back-up made no sense in the context of the programme, especially considering that the main team was a quasi-government organisation. The third series also introduced Christine Johnson (played by Belinda Stewart-Wilson) as the head of a rival government department to the one run by James Lester (played by Ben Miller, Steward-Wilson's husband at the time); the idea of the character was that there is rivalry between different government departments in the real world and that the production team wanted to see Lester in new and different situations where he would not be as sure of himself as in previous series.

=== Creatures ===
Original drawing of a "Megopteran" by 16-year-old Carim Nahaboo (top) and the final creature design in Primeval (bottom). Nahaboo's design was the winner of a contest held for designing your own Primeval creature.

The choice of which creatures to portray in Primeval was made during the pre-production phase of each series. By the third series, finding creatures that were sufficiently unique and different from what had previously been used in the programme was beginning to present a problem. For the third series there was also a more concentrated effort to make the creatures have a story function and a function for the relationships to and between the characters. As a result, the third series saw a mixture of more novel creatures. Herbivores were rarely used in earlier series due to not presenting as many opportunities of being dangerous to the characters but the ninth episode featured a herd of Embolotherium, not particularly dangerous animals in of themselves but presenting a danger due to their large size and moving around in a herd. The fourth episode featured Giganotosaurus, one of the largest creatures to ever feature in Primeval, and the fifth episode introduced a species of future fungus different from anything that had previously appeared in the series. Another new addition was the "Camouflage Beast", a future creature capable of blending into any surface, which appears in the haunted house-horror inspired second episode.

In 2008, the producers launched a competition for fans of the show to design their own creature for Primeval. The competition ran from 30 January to 7 April and the winning entry was the "Megopteran", a future carnivorous giant insect designed by then sixteen-year-old Carim Nahaboo. Nahaboo's design was picked from the over 5000 submitted entries by the executive producer Tim Haines and other members of the production team. Nahaboo mainly based his design on a mantis. The design was altered only slightly for Primeval, being given greater wings and shorter, stabbing forelimbs. Nahaboo was happy with the final design, liking the altered limbs and noting that it was still very much the same creature. The Megopterans first appeared in the eighth episode of the third series and also reappeared in the tenth episode. Nahaboo was given a tour of both the Framestore office (Framestore being the company responsible for the visual effects of the series) and the set during the filming of the eighth episode, and met with directors, producers, artists and the actors.

=== Visual effects ===
Framestore began working on effects for the third series in April 2008, with a pre-production period a month longer than during previous series Though Primeval only ever had a fraction of the budget of theatrical films with similar scopes, Framestore were for the third series able to make use of techniques learnt and resources gathered during the work of some employees on bigger budget theatrical film projects. The process of creating the effects for the third series was also more streamlined, owing to experience gained from the work on the first and second series, and the Framestore effects team had greater input in the series, being involved very early in the scripting stage and as a consequence were able to offer advice on what was achievable and what was not. A new method for creating the creature models was used during the production of the third series; instead of making physical models which were then scanned in, the team tried out a method in which the concept work for the creatures was done in-house at Framestore. This creative process not only intended to speed up the process but also circumvent previous issues when some models at times had been impossible to animate convincingly.

Initially, Framestore signed on to produce 720 visual effects shots for the third series but the company ended up contributing around 100–1000 shots per episode, out of which around 600 were effects for the different creatures. In addition to creature shots, visual effects were also used for some vehicles (including a plane and a helicopter), the anomalies, and some environments (including a post-apocalyptic future city). Framestore made use of several new technologies for the third series, including a dynamic system to fluff up feathers and fur originally developed for the film The Chronicles of Narnia: Prince Caspian (2008), 3D motion blur, custom shaders for all the creatures and a newer version of the 3D rendering application Mental Ray.

=== Filming ===
The third series of Primeval was filmed in middle to late 2008 over a period of about six months. Among the many filming locations were La Palma in the Canaries, where the cast spent two weeks, the British Museum, the St Pancras railway station, and Wokingham. By the filming of the third series, the cast of Primeval mostly did their own stunt work. For Flemyng, doing the stunts was a fulfilment of his childhood dream to be a stuntman.

== Release ==
=== Broadcast and ratings ===
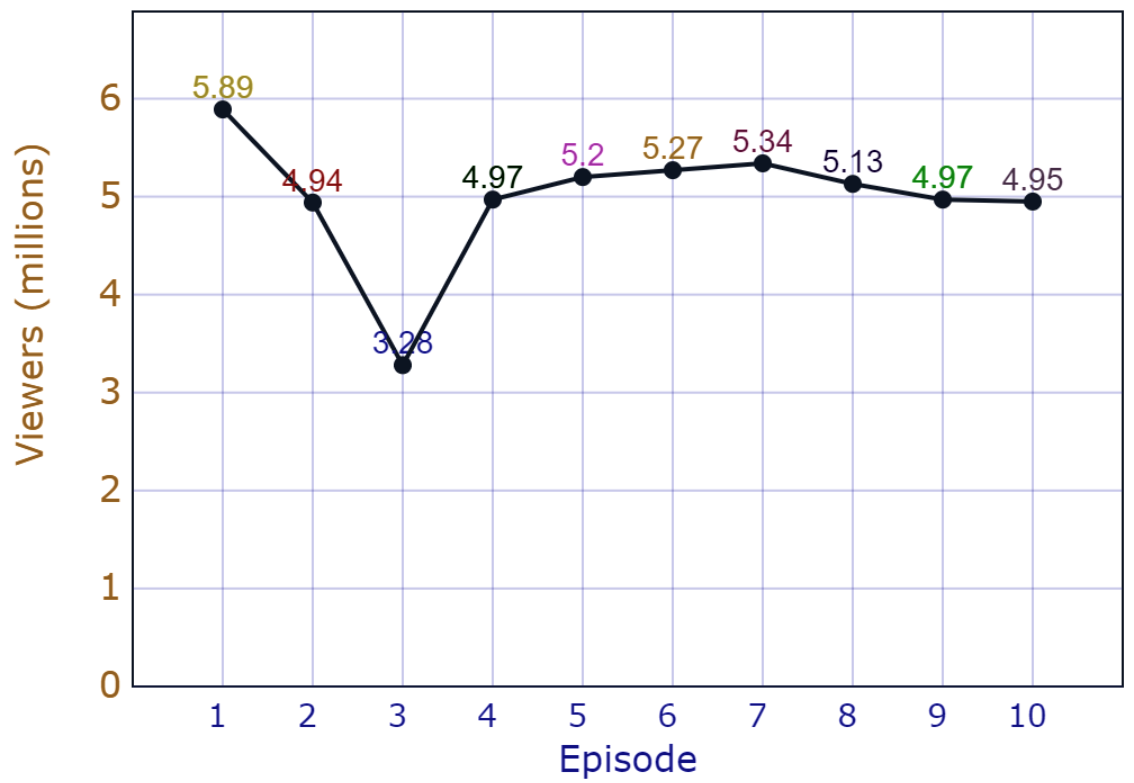
UK ratings for the episodes of the third series

The production of the third series was announced by ITV on 30 January 2008, during the broadcast of the second series. The broadcast of the third series in 2009 was somewhat delayed, beginning later in the year than previous series, owing to the transmission of the vampire series Demons (3 January – 7 February). The later broadcast meant that unlike for previous series, there was no remaining additional work being done on the later episodes while the earlier ones aired.

The third series averaged about five million viewers per episode, seen as a successful run but down from the more than six million of the first and second series. The most viewed episode was the first episode, with 5.89 million viewers, and the least viewed episode was the third episode, with 3.28 million viewers. The series ended with the tenth episode being seen by 4.95 million viewers.

=== Online integration ===
The third series was accompanied by the tie-in online game Primeval Evolved, in which new content was released weekly after each episode had aired, referencing the events in the TV series. The game was commissioned by ITV as part of their efforts to create online content to attract audiences to their websites. Primeval Evolved was promoted at the end of each episode on ITV. In the game, players were recruited by the mysterious Eve (Note: After appearing in the game for several weeks, Eve made appearances in the TV series in the eighth and ninth episodes and was then revealed to be the antagonist Helen Cutter in disguise.) and greeted by a cast member of the fictional Anomaly Research Centre (ARC) and could interact with various items in the home lab. The game extended the ongoing narrative of the series and allowed players to become active participants in the storyline. The game won the 2010 International Emmy Award for Digital Program: Fiction and nominated for the 2010 BAFTA television award for New Media.

In addition to Primeval Evolved, ITV's "online push" for the third series also involved embedding a Twitter window beneath its online player. On March 26, two days before the first episode aired on ITV, the first seven minutes of the first episode were aired online, with viewers being able to share their thoughts live through the Twitter feed. Primeval had during preceding series been much discussed by fans on Twitter and the integration of the feed on the ITV website was done to make this a more visual experience, showing the comments alongside the content itself.

=== Home media ===
The DVD release of the third series included the 20-minute behind-the-scenes documentary Cutter's Odyssey, which tracked the character development of Nick Cutter and Henshall's own thoughts on the making of Primeval, and the 20-minute documentary Genesis of a Creature, which focused on the development of Carim Nahaboo's competition-winning Megopteran creature design.

DVD title	Number and duration of episodes	Release date
Primeval: The Complete Series Three	10 x 45 min.	1 June 2009
Primeval: Series One - Three	23 x 45 min.	1 June 2009
Primeval: The Complete Series One - Five	36 x 45 min.	7 November 2011

== Critical reception ==
Elliot Thorpe of Den of Geek gave the third series a positive review, noting that although it had even though it incorporated "clichéd set pieces", cheesy and clunky dialogue and wood acting, he still greatly enjoyed the programme. Thorpe felt that the greater number of episodes did not mean that the series outstayed its welcome, but that it instead was able to incorporate more characterisation and expand on its central story. He gave particular praise to the actions of characters having repercussions and impact, noting that Primeval was not limited by the story constraints of many shows in similar genres, and that the third series took the characters the audience had learnt to know in the first two series and made them suffer and strive. Thorpe liked the addition of Sarah and Becker to the roster of characters and also felt that Jenny's departure was "a necessity" after Nick Cutter's death. He found the swift appointment of Danny Quinn as team leader to be more questionable, however, but noted that Quinn "successfully added a new element to the team". Matt Barber, also of Den of Geek, was less positive and unfavourably compared Primeval to the new series of Doctor Who but also felt that the third series played into his nostalgia for the Jon Pertwee era of Doctor Who (1970–1974) and noted that the efforts of some of the episodes of the third series to shift the focus away from "dinosaur-of-the-week spectacle" to tension, suspense and creepiness was encouraging.

Paul Simpson of Sci-Fi Bulletin reviewed each episode of the series individually and strongly praised the third series as a whole, referring to it as "Primeval's strongest year by far" and gave particular praise to episodes three, five, six and eight, all of which he rated 8/10. Simpson also repeatedly compared the feel of the third series to the Jon Pertwee era of Doctor Who in that it featured "scientists and the military working together, with a maverick in the middle", the maverick in this case being Danny Quinn. Simpson found Quinn's introduction to the series to be a "breath of fresh air after the occasionally angst-ridden Cutter". The more varied sides shown by some of the characters, including James Lester, also received praise from Simpson. Both Simpson and Thorpe of Den of Geek criticised the character Jack Maitland, Abby's brother, and the subplot involving him late in the series as "not working" and being a "weak link".

Eamonn McCusker of The Digital Fix also praised the third series as perhaps the best of Primeval yet, noting that the series had "hit something of a stride". He particularly praised the episodes that took more of a horror inspiration and "freed [themselves] from the dinosaur-shaped noose around [their] neck to have fun with creatures that are clearly the invention of [the] writers" and how many of the episodes served to develop the characters. Simon Cole of CultBox gave the third series three out of five stars, noting that the series was entertaining and did not take itself too seriously but also finding the cast changes strange and that the CGI creatures, though "perfectly serviceable for a TV show", needed a higher budget and needed to interact more with the actors. Craig Byrne of KryptonSite gave the third series a positive review, noting that "almost every episode is an enjoyable romp" and that the series was good entertainment. Byrne lamented the departure of Nick Cutter due to the series almost revolving around him but also felt that Danny Quinn was a "worthy replacement character".

== Cancellation and revival ==
Although the third series still received good ratings, Primeval was cancelled after its broadcast by ITV executive Peter Fincham for financial reasons. ITV was at the time of Primeval's cancellation, due to the Great Recession and declining advertising revenues, only two weeks from going bankrupt despite already cancelling several programmes. Although Impossible Pictures, the production company behind the series, looked at a number of different options to ensure a fourth series could be made, including producing the series cheaper (for £600,000 per episode) or offering first-run rights to a rival channel, Primeval was officially cancelled on 15 June 2009, a decision likely motivated at least in part by the budget required for the effects. Costing around £8 million per series, Primeval was expensive to make and ITV could not claim all of the money earned by the series due to it being produced independently by Impossible Pictures.

Upon receiving the news of the cancellation, the production team of the series stated that they had "every intention of keeping Primeval alive in other ways". During the production of the third series, the producers had at no point expected that Primeval would not return for a fourth series, stating in subsequent interviews that they would not have left as many of character's fates up in the air had they known of the threat of cancellation.

Three months after the cancellation, Fincham recommissioned Primeval. The "resurrection" of the series was made possible through a new deal made by Impossible Pictures, in which the series would be co-produced by both ITV and UKTV (with the costs shared), with additional funding also being provided by BBC Worldwide and ProSieben. The deal secured the making of thirteen new episodes, split into a fourth and fifth series. The fourth series would air on ITV and then on the UKTV-owned channel Watch whereas the fifth series would air first on Watch. Most of the third series cast was announced to return for the fourth and fifth series, though Laila Rouass announced her exit due to being a single parent and the fourth and fifth series being filmed back-to-back over a ten-month period.
