= Primeval series 4 =

2011 series of British sci-fi programme

Primeval
- Series 4
- DVD box set cover art
- Starring: Ciarán McMenamin; Andrew-Lee Potts; Hannah Spearritt; Ben Miller; Alexander Siddig; Ben Mansfield; Ruth Kearney; Anton Lesser; Ruth Bradley; Jonathan Byrne
- No. of episodes: 7

Release
- Original network: ITV
- Original release: 1 January – 5 February 2011

Series chronology
- ← Previous; Series 3 Next → Series 5

The fourth series of the British science fiction programme Primeval began on 1 January 2011 and concluded on 5 February 2011 after airing seven episodes. Primeval follows a team of scientists tasked with investigating the appearance of temporal anomalies across the United Kingdom through which prehistoric and futuristic creatures enter the present. Following the departures of key actors in the third series and the inability of some of the actors to return for the fourth series, several new main cast members were introduced, including Ciarán McMenamin, Ruth Kearney, Alexander Siddig and Ruth Bradley.

After the broadcast of its third series, Primeval was cancelled by ITV in June 2009 due to financial issues but it was renewed for two more series after ITV and the production company Impossible Pictures worked out a deal for co-funding with UKTV. The fourth and fifth series were produced concurrently in 2010. The writing of the fourth series was focused mainly on resolving lingering plotlines, introducing the new characters, setting up plot elements in preparation for the fifth series, and developing the remaining characters from previous series further. The fourth series marked the first time Primeval was filmed in HD and also the first time the visual effects of the series were created by The Mill rather than Framestore (responsible for the previous series).

The fourth series achieved somewhat disappointing ratings compared to preceding series, averaging about four million viewers (compared to the five million of the third series and the over six millions of the first two series). Critical reception was also more mixed than previously, with criticism leveled at the overall slow narrative progression and the manner in which the final episode resolved the storylines. Opinions varied on the new characters, with some reviewers enjoying the team dynamic and others finding them to be poorly established. The development of the returning characters was more universally liked and the visual effects received universal praise, many critics finding them to be the best of the series thus far.

== Synopsis ==
The fourth series of Primeval is set an extended period of time, approximately twelve months, after the third series. The deaths and disappearances of several key ARC (Anomaly Research Centre) personnel has seen the British government lose faith in the operation, placing it under a partnership, partially funded by the government and partially by the entrepreneur Philip Burton (Alexander Siddig). The ARC is still run by James Lester (Ben Miller), but he now has to begrudgingly accept Burton's involvement and operate out of new lodgings in Burton's industrial complex. The disappearances of Danny Quinn (Jason Flemyng), Connor Temple (Andrew-Lee Potts) and Abby Maitland (Hannah Spearritt) has forced the ARC to recruit new personnel, including the new field leader Matt Anderson (Ciarán McMenamin) and the field coordinator Jess Parker (Ruth Kearney). In addition to being explained in promotional material, the events behind the third and fourth series were also revealed through a series of short webisodes released on the Primeval website.

== Episodes ==
No. overall	No. in series	Episode	Directed by	Written by	Original release date	UK viewers (millions)
24	1	Episode 1 "Back from the Cretaceous"	Mark Everest	Paul Mousley	1 January 2011	4.45
After a year trapped in the Cretaceous period, Abby and Connor finally return to the present, followed by a giant Spinosaurus, the longest known carnivorous dinosaur. The new ARC team responds. Eventually, the Spinosaurus is returned to the Cretaceous period, when Connor causes an anomaly to implode, from within it. Note: In the episode's initial broadcast, Abby uses the song Don't Stop Movin' to distract the Spinosaurus, a reference to her actress Hannah Spearritt originally being a member of S Club 7 before their break-up.
25	2	Episode 2 "Be Inconspicuous"	Mark Everest	Steve Bailie	2 January 2011	3.29
Connor and his old friend, Duncan (James Bradshaw), track an elusive Kaprosuchus to the docks, and find evidence of a fresh kill. After bringing it down by using their EMD weapons, Connor and Abby then win back their places on the team.
26	3	Episode 3 "Lockdown"	Cilla Ware	Debbie Oates	8 January 2011	4.17
Three 19th-century humans come through an anomaly in a theatre, and are followed by deadly "tree creepers", arboreal dromaeosaurs. One of the time travellers, Ethan Dobrowski (Jonathan Byrne), is a serial killer and another, Emily Merchant (Ruth Bradley), appeals to Matt to help catch him. After the team deals with the "tree creepers", Matt tells Emily that he is going to help her to track down Ethan.
27	4	Episode 4 "Breakfast Club"	Cilla Ware	Paul Gerstenberger	15 January 2011	4.15
Dozens of venomous therocephalians are stalking a school's corridors and a detention class becomes a bloodbath when a teacher and a student are killed. Connor and some students use chemical warfare to finally subdue the creatures. In the ARC, Abby's menagerie is under threat, when Philip Burton (Alexander Siddig) threatens to kill them. However, with a little bit of help from Lester, Abby eventually manages to subdue Philip, thus allowing her creatures, to live. Meanwhile, over at Matt's flat, Emily is kidnapped by Ethan.
28	5	Episode 5 "The Worm"	Robert Quinn	Adrian Hodges & John Fay	22 January 2011	4.21
Connor, Abby, and Matt are sent to a coastal village, where they discover that a farmer and her son are concealing a labyrinthodont, which has been attacking the local cattle and has killed a tourist. After it kills the two villainous farmers, Connor and Abby then force it back through the anomaly, while Matt follows the tracker Emily carried to a cemetery where Ethan has taken her and left her bound and gagged inside a coffin. Matt rescues Emily, but Ethan escapes. Gideon (Anton Lesser) warns Matt that Ethan presents a terrible danger to humanity, much like Helen Cutter did.
29	6	Episode 6 "The Brave Bride"	Robert Quinn	Matthew Parkhill	29 January 2011	3.83
An anomaly allows a pack of Hyaenodons to make their home in the wine cellar of a stately home, where Jenny Lewis is getting married. The wolf-like creatures eat the wedding planner. Jenny and the team subdue them using medieval weaponry. Meanwhile, Becker narrowly escapes a lethal boobytrap set by Ethan, after Jess saves him; Lester remotely conducts Jenny's marriage. Gideon's "home" is shown – a blasted desolate world. He finally dies from his illness, and he is then revealed to be Matt's father.
30	7	Episode 7 "Surprising Visit"	Mark Everest	Paul Mousley	5 February 2011	4.09
A pair of anomalies opens in a prison, one to the Pliocene allowing a terror bird to attack, and Danny Quinn to return. He meets Ethan and realises that he is his lost younger brother, Patrick Quinn. Matt reveals to Emily that he is from the future, and trying to prevent an apocalypse involving the anomalies. Emily returns to the 19th century. Danny warns the team that Philip Burton was involved with Helen Cutter, then he follows Patrick into the Pliocene. Connor discovers that the incidence of anomalies is increasing, and is potentially dangerous.

== Cast ==
=== Main cast ===
- Ciarán McMenamin as Matt Anderson
- Andrew-Lee Potts as Connor Temple
- Hannah Spearritt as Abby Maitland
- Ben Miller as James Lester
- Alexander Siddig as Philip Burton
- Ben Mansfield as Captain Hilary Becker
- Ruth Kearney as Jess Parker
- Anton Lesser as Gideon Anderson
- Ruth Bradley as Emily Merchant
- Jonathan Byrne as Ethan Dobrowski

=== Guest cast ===
- Jason Flemyng as Danny Quinn
- Lucy Brown as Jenny Lewis
- James Bradshaw as Duncan
- Michael Bates as Site Foreman
- Melanie Valanzuolo as Mary
- Sara James as Charlotte Cameron
- Brendan McCormack as Mr. George
- Patrick Gibson as Steve
- Ciarán Flynn as Darren
- Lauren Coe as Beth
- Anne Kent as Moira Lennon
- Brian Gleeson as Ray Lennon
- Johnny Ward as Ted
- Mal Whyte as Barman
- Duncan Lacroix as Neil
- Bradley Burke as Boy
- Rory Keenan as Michael
- Norma Sheenan as Margaret
- Barbara Adair as Lily
- Peter Hanly as Registrar

== Production ==
=== Cancellation and revival ===
Despite a successful third series, Primeval was cancelled by ITV executive Peter Fincham on 15 June 2009 for financial reasons; due to the Great Recession and declining advertising revenues, ITV was at the time only two weeks from going bankrupt despite already cancelling several programmes. ITV declined to recommission Primeval for a fourth series despite Impossible Pictures, the production company behind the series, proposing numerous different options, such as producing the series cheaper (for £600,000 per episode) or offering first-run rights to a rival channel. The cancellation was likely primarily motivated by the effects budget; Primeval cost around £8 million per series and ITV could not claim all of the money earned by the series due to it being produced independently by Impossible Pictures.

Upon receiving the news of the cancellation, the production team of the series stated that they had "every intention of keeping Primeval alive in other ways". During the production of the third series, the producers had at no point expected that Primeval would not return for a fourth series, stating in subsequent interviews that they would not have left as many of character's fates up in the air had they known of the threat of cancellation. Three months after the cancellation, Fincham recommissioned Primeval. The "resurrection" of the series was made possible through a new deal made by Impossible Pictures, in which the series would be co-produced by both ITV and UKTV (with the costs shared), with additional funding also being provided by BBC Worldwide and ProSieben. The deal secured the making of thirteen new episodes, split into a fourth and fifth series. The fourth series would air on ITV and then on the UKTV-owned channel Watch whereas the fifth series would air first on Watch. The production team were thrilled to be able to produce two additional series since it would allow them to resolve the plotlines of the previous series and move Primeval further. The fourth and fifth series had a combined budget of £15 million.

=== Writing and development ===
Although most of the cast of the third series were announced as returning for the fourth and fifth series, the production needed to cast several new characters; the third series had seen the departure of protagonists Nick Cutter (Douglas Henshall) and Jenny Lewis (Lucy Brown) as well as antagonist Helen Cutter (Juliet Aubrey). Though new main characters were added in the third series to replace them, not all actors were able to return for the fourth series; Laila Rouass, who played new addition Sarah Page, announced her exit due to being a single parent and not being able to commit to the lengthy filming period of the two new series. In the context of the series, her absence was explained by her character having died offscreen. Jason Flemyng, who played the new lead character Danny Quinn, was also unable to return in a large capacity on account of a movie role and ultimately only made an appearance in the final episode of the fourth series. Much of the fourth series as envisioned prior to the cancellation would have revolved around Danny Quinn's relationships with the other characters which meant that a lot had to be reworked. The ending to Quinn's storyline as shown in the last episode of the fourth series was the original intended ending for his character but it would probably not have transpired as quickly if Flemyng had been able to star in the entire series.

In addition to Danny Quinn, the third series also left Connor Temple (Andrew-Lee Potts) and Abby Maitland (Hannah Spearritt) stranded in the past. Though Potts and Maitland reappeared in the first episode of the fourth series and continued to be part of the main cast thereafter, they were, alongside Ben Miller, the only main cast members to remain from the first series. Although her character was killed off at the end of the previous series, Juliet Aubrey still expressed a wish to return to Primeval during the pre-production of the fourth series. Fans speculated that Nick Cutter would make a return, despite also having been killed off, but Douglas Henshall denied the rumours.

The new cast members Ciarán McMenamin, Ruth Kearney and Alexander Siddig were announced on the ITV website on 8 April 2010. The disappearance of Danny Quinn at the end of the third series and Flemyng's inability to come back for a full series necessitated the introduction of a new ARC team leader. His replacement was Matt Anderson, played by Ciarán McMenamin. McMenamin had previously worked together with the Primeval co-creator Adrian Hodges on the 1999 film David Copperfield. McMenamin was approached by the production team for the role and was eager at the opportunity since it was something different from his usual roles in realistic dramas and period pieces. McMenamin was also particularly thrilled to work together with Ben Miller, who had been a hero of his since watching early episodes of Armstrong and Miller in the 1990s. Matt Anderson was written to be a quite mysterious character, having a hidden agenda of his own and combining elements of both Nick and Helen Cutter.

The third series had seen Ben Miller's James Lester battling with his rival Christine Johnson (played by Miller's then wife Belinda Stewart-Wilson), a storyline and dynamic that both Miller and the producers had felt was very successful and engaging. As a result of wanting to keep the element of Lester not being fully in charge, the producers introduced the new character Philip Burton (Alexander Siddig); a technology mogul who due to his funding has partial control over the ARC and as a result has much to say about what goes on. Siddig was approached about Primeval by Adrian Hodges, whom he knew through yearly Sunday lunches at a mutual friend's house. Philip Burton was as an antagonist initially envisioned as a "problem child"-type character who was relatively nice but caused trouble out of greed and ambition rather than maliciousness; his growing interest in the anomalies was to be based on ideas of scientific exploitation rather than a desire to protect the public. The character grew more and more complex as the result of Siddig's suggestions and conversations with the directors while on set. A new set was created for the ARC to reflect the organisation having received a large upgrade and major increase in funding by Burton.

The new character Jess Parker (Ruth Kearney) was written to fill a role that had never been the job of any particular character previously, monitoring screens that indicate anomaly activity and sending the other members of the team out on missions as a sort of Mission Control. Kearney likened her character to Connor Temple in the first series in that Jess was very excitable and enjoyed learning, though noted that she grows more casual and cool over the course of the series.

Captain Becker (Ben Mansfield) was introduced in the third series mainly as a replacement of the military figure Tom Ryan (Mark Wakeling), who was killed off at the end of the first series. In the fourth series, the producers spent time putting Becker in the spotlight more and developing his character beyond that of Ryan's in the first series and properly cementing him as a member of the team. Becker in the fourth series was written to be more mature and as having reached a more senior position in the team; despite joining only during the third series, he was at the start of the fourth series as a result of all the departures and temporal disappearances the longest-serving member of the ARC team other than James Lester. Becker was also written to be remorseful and more careful due to feeling that he was partly to blame for the great losses suffered by the team. Time was also spent on developing the other returning characters further; Connor Temple (Andrew-Lee Potts) and Abby Maitland (Hannah Spearritt) were at last made a couple after a long "will-they-won't-they" relationship and the two were, due to having been stranded in the past for a year, written to be a stronger unit together and as having picked up new skills. Connor was consciously written to begin to become more like his former mentor Nick Cutter.

=== Creatures ===
The fourth series made use of several creatures that had been seen in previous series, such as dromaeosaurs and Dracorex, but also introduced new unique creatures, such as Kaprosuchus and the "tree creeper", a fictional arboreal dromaeosaur species. Details on the creatures that would appear in the first three episodes of the fourth series were unveiled on 7 December 2010, revealing the appearance of Spinosaurus and re-appearance of Dracorex and the dromaeosaurs in the first episode, the appearance of Kaprosuchus in the second episode, and the appearance of the fictional "tree creeper" in the third episode.

=== Visual effects ===
Although it was initially announced that the visual effects company Framestore would work on the visual effects of the fourth series, having worked on the effects of previous series, they ended up not partaking in the production. Instead, the visual effects of the fourth and fifth series were created by the visual effects company The Mill. According to Tim Haines, executive producer and co-creator of the series, the production team opted to work with The Mill due to shooting in HD, an area in which The Mill had a "superb track record".

=== Filming ===
Unlike previous series of Primeval, which had filmed primarily in London, the fourth and fifth series were filmed in Ireland. The move to Ireland was done both on account of Irish tax incentives for filming and to be able to use locations unused in the series thus far. Urban scenes were shot in Dublin, which allowed the producers to keep the modern look of the series intact. Other filming locations used for the first block of filming included the Powerscourt Estate, The O2 Arena, Dublin port, Grand Canal Dock, and Park West Business Park. The production created 70 jobs in the Irish entertainment sector.

The fourth and fifth series were filmed back-to-back over a ten-month period, from 22 March to November 2010. The episodes of the fourth series took four months to film, with filming finishing on 25 June 2010. The fourth series marked the first time that Primeval filmed in HD. ITV released the first set photograph from the fourth series on 26 June 2010.

== Release ==
=== Broadcast and ratings ===
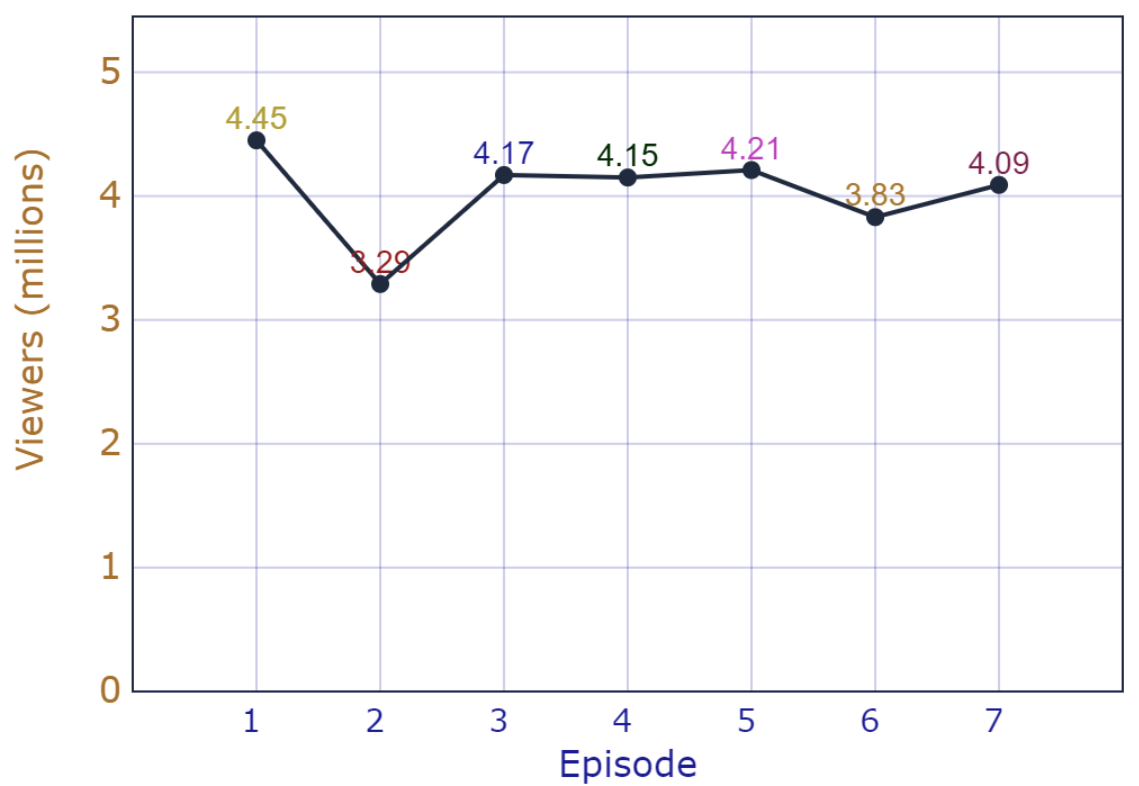
UK ratings for the episodes of the fourth series

The production of the fourth and fifth series was announced by ITV on 29 September 2009. The first promotional trailer for the fourth series was released in November 2010. The fourth series averaged about four million viewers per episode, down from the five million of the third series and the over six million of the first and second series and considered somewhat disappointing by commentators. The most viewed episode was the first episode, with 4.45 million viewers, and the least viewed episode was the second episode, with 3.29 million viewers. The series ended with the seventh episode being seen by 4.09 million viewers.

=== Home media ===
The DVD release of the fourth series included the behind-the-scenes documentary New Dawn - Making the New Primeval. The fourth series was the first series of Primeval to also be released on Blu-ray.

DVD title	Number and duration of episodes	Release date
Primeval: The Complete Series Four	7 x 45 min.	21 February 2011
Primeval: The Complete Series One - Five	36 x 45 min.	7 November 2011

== Critical reception ==
Dan Owen of WhatCulture gave the opening episode of the fourth series a mixed review, considering the series from the start as having placed greater emphasis on "CGI beasties over characterization and acting" and, though showing understanding on account of the behind-the-scenes troubles, finding the frequent cast changes disappointing. Owen considered the opening episode to have done a poor job at establishing all the new characters and found some of the acting to be "dreary". He did however conclude that the series remained a "ridiculous show with a fun premise", working well when it did not take itself too seriously, and praised the special effects as "undeniably impressive" and "a definite improvement on what's gone before".

Robert McLaughlin of Den of Geek reviewed each episode of the series individually. McLaughlin felt that the first two episodes were "solid establishing episodes" and that although they had some "clichéd" and "lazy" parts, the "prospects [looked] good" for the rest of the series. Though he considered the third episode to be "dull", McLaughlin though the fourth episode was a "viable piece of survival horror drama" which was "pretty gripping" and "not too bad" and the fifth episode, although lacking somewhat in narrative progression, to be fun and reminiscent of Doctor Who stories such as Horror of Fang Rock and Warriors of the Deep. McLaughlin found the sixth episode to be a "good solid episode" in which the more serious storylines of the series "seemed to hit a high point" but was sorely disappointed by the final episode, which he found to be "terrible" and rushing to resolve storylines, "ruining any momentum" built up in the previous episodes and offering disappointing answers and resolutions. McLaughlin praised the action of the series as "fun" and the visual effects as "top-notch, especially for a Saturday night television show". He gave particular praise to the Hyaenodon models of the sixth episode for looking convincing when rendered in broad daylight.

Paul Simpson of Sci-Fi Bulletin also reviewed each episode of the series individually. Simpson also felt that the narrative progression was somewhat slow in the fourth series, only "finally" starting to bring things together in the fifth episode. He did however still enjoy the episodes, writing that there was a "heightened sense of danger" on account of the many character deaths in previous series and also enjoying that the episodes of the fourth series could not easily be labelled as "Primeval does [insert name of well-known genre movie]", as he felt was the case for many previous episodes. Simson also praised the visual effects, noting that the HD broadcast demanded a higher standard of effects work than before and that The Mill "are to be congratulated on their contributions".

Another episode-by-episode reviewer was Candice Grace of TV Equals. Like Owen of WhatCulture, Grace found the fourth series to be a mixed bag and thought that it unsuccessfully struggled to make the audience care about the new team; she found Matt to be a "dull leading man" and strongly disliked Jess in the early episodes though warmed up to her from the fifth episode onwards. After finding the first three episodes somewhat weak, Grace was impressed by the fourth episode, in particular due to breaking conventional tropes in that "the pretty girl doesn't miraculously survive until the end" and "the geeky guy really doesn't get the girl". Overall, she thought the fourth series was experiencing something of an identity crisis, with the set-up being military-based but the storyline being more geared towards a small group of people surviving dinosaurs and having love lives. Though she found the final episode to be "solid", "compelling" and an "entertaining series finale", she questioned the resolution of the series storyline which seemed to suggest that the previous six episodes had been spent on misdirections and a "non-existant [sic] plot arc". Grace praised the pairing of Connor and Abby as the "cutest couple on television".

Matt Sernaker of ComicsOnline gave the fourth and fifth series a positive review, giving both a score of 4/5. Sernaker particularly praised the new cast members, writing that he had felt something missing from the team dynamic ever since the departure of Nick Cutter, but that the new series "recaptured some of that missing magic".
