= Katie Newman =

British screenwriter and producer

Katherine Newman is a British screenwriter and producer.

Newman worked as executive producer of drama at the production company Impossible Pictures and worked together with Tim Haines on the science fiction series Primeval, produced for ITV, for about nine years. She was promoted to associate producer for Primeval's fourth and fifth series (2011). Newman also worked as executive producer on the Canadian spinoff of the series, Primeval: New World.

When ITV created its drama unit in 2013, Haines was hired as creative director and Newman was hired as executive producer of drama. In 2013, she helped develop the series Sinbad. In 2016, she created the series Beowulf: Return to the Shieldlands together with Haines.

== Filmography ==
=== Writer ===
Year	Title
2016	Beowulf: Return to the Shieldlands, 1 episode

=== Producer ===
Year	Title
2011	Primeval (associate producer)
2012–2013	Primeval: New World (executive producer)
2016	Beowulf: Return to the Shieldlands (executive producer; co-creator)
