= Hoodlum (production company) =

Hoodlum is an Australian production company founded by Nathan Mayfield and Tracey Robertson, with a main office in Brisbane and a U.S. office in Los Angeles as of 2015. The company also operates in the UK.

== Work ==
In 2011, Hoodlum produced the FOX8 multi-platform 10-part TV drama series SLiDE, which was nominated for an International Emmy Kids Award.

In 2012 Hoodlum produced The Strange Calls, a six-part narrative comedy series for Australia's ABC. In January 2015, a U.S. adaptation of The Strange Calls was ordered to pilot at NBC. Hoodlum also worked with ABC (U.S.) on a remake of Fat Cow Motel, their 13-part TV comedy series.

In 2014, Hoodlum's television division produced the six-part show Secrets & Lies for Network Ten Australia. It also produced the adaptation of Secrets and Lies for ABC (U.S.), which returned for a second season in 2016.

In 2015, the company produced a teen sci-fi feature film Red Sands, for Disney, set in the Australian outback. In the same year, developed the psychological thriller Exposure for A&E Studios and Lifetime (U.S.), and the supernatural drama Tidelands for Netflix.

Hoodlum Digital has created many multi-platform experiences for TV and film franchises, including The Bourne Legacy; Lost (for which they won a Creative Arts Emmy Award); Spooks (for which they won two BAFTA Craft Awards); and Primeval. Their online game Primeval Evolved won an International Digital Emmy. Other work includes Salt, Vikings, and Texas Rising.

As of June 2023 Hoodlum was working on the film of the book No Friend But the Mountains, by journalist and refugee advocate Behrouz Boochani.

== Personnel ==
Screenwriter and director Lucas Taylor was a creative director at Hoodlum from 2011 or 2012 to 2016. He worked on where he worked on various projects, including The Bourne Legacy, Salt, Dance Academy, Primeval, and Divergent.

As of June 2023, co-founders Robertson and Mayfield share the role of chief creative officer, leading a team of four creatives and two business staff.
