= Primeval Evolved =

2010 online video game

- Developer(s): Hoodlum Entertainment
- Publisher(s): ITV1
- Series: Set During Series Three of Primeval
- Platform(s): Browser

Primeval Evolved was an online game of the ITV series Primeval, produced by ITV1, itv.com, Hoodlum Entertainment and Impossible Pictures. It won the 2010 International Emmy Award for Digital Program: Fiction and nominated for the 2010 BAFTA television award for New Media. A new level was released after each episode of series three and referenced in that week's episode. After a recap of the previous game installment, the player was greeted by a cast member of the fictional Anomaly Research Centre (ARC) and could interact with various items in the home lab. A clue word announced during the end credits helped solve each game, and finishing one week gave the player an entry into a competition to win principal character Nick Cutter's jacket. A game was released the following Monday which usually involved the player helping Eve. There was also an introduction level before the series started and the tenth week featured very little content. The game is no longer online, and there is no other information suggesting a new series of this or any other game if a new series of Primeval airs.
