= Secrets and Lies (American TV series) =

- Season 1 title card
- Genre: Detective fiction; Mystery
- Based on: Secrets & Lies by Stephen M. Irwin
- Developed by: Barbie Kligman
- Starring: Ryan Phillippe; KaDee Strickland; Dan Fogler; Natalie Martinez; Indiana Evans; Belle Shouse; Juliette Lewis; Jordana Brewster; Mekia Cox; Charlie Barnett; Kenny Johnson; Terry O'Quinn; Michael Ealy
- Composer: Matteo Zingales
- Country of origin: United States
- Original language: English
- No. of seasons: 2
- No. of episodes: 20

Production
- Executive producers: Timothy Busfield; Tracey Robertson; Nathan Mayfield; Aaron Kaplan; Barbie Kligman
- Producers: Barbara D'Alessandro; Joe Halpin; Caroline James
- Production location: Charlotte, North Carolina
- Cinematography: Frank G. DeNmark; Robert Humphreys
- Editors: Kaja Fehr; Robert Ivison; Mike Jackson; Pamela Malouf
- Running time: 43 minutes
- Production companies: ABC Studios; Avenue K Productions; Hoodlum Entertainment; Kapital Entertainment

Original release
- Network: ABC
- Release: March 1, 2015 – December 4, 2016

Related
- Secrets & Lies (Australia)

Secrets and Lies is an American mystery anthology television series that aired on ABC from March 1, 2015, to December 4, 2016. The series is based on the Australian television series of the same name, and developed for American television by Barbie Kligman.

The series follows Detective Andrea Cornell (Juliette Lewis) of the Charlotte-Mecklenburg County Police Department as she investigates homicide cases. In the first season, Ben Crawford (Ryan Phillippe) becomes the prime suspect in the death of a young boy who lived in his neighborhood. In the second season, Cornell investigates Eric Warner (Michael Ealy), a newly married heir to his family's private equity firm, when his wife Kate is murdered.

The series was renewed for a second season on May 7, 2015, which premiered on September 25, 2016, and concluded on December 4, 2016. On May 11, 2017, ABC cancelled the series after two seasons.

== Plot summary ==
=== Season one ===
Ben Crawford is a self-employed contractor married to Christy, with whom he has two daughters, Natalie, 16, and Abby, 12. His best friend, Dave, lives in their summer house. They have a neighbor, Jess, who is estranged from her husband Scott, who is in the military. Jess and Scott have a four-year-old son named Tom.

While out for an early morning run, Ben discovers Tom's body; he was evidently taken from his bed into the woods and killed by six blows to the head from a flashlight.

Detective Cornell is convinced Ben is the killer, but Ben cannot prove his innocence because he suffered a blackout after going out drinking with Dave following a fight with Christy over her suspicion of an affair with Jess.

The Crawfords suffer media intrusion and are shunned by the community; a misunderstanding leads to a falling-out with Dave. They learn that Tom was in fact Ben's son, the result of a one-night affair, only revealed to him after DNA tests by police.

Ben conducts his own investigations, leading to false accusations against Scott and other neighbors. He is manipulated by a reporter, Arthur, who is looking to take down Cornell, and kidnapped by a neighbor, Kevin, a former CIA operative, who attempts to extract a confession through torture.

The rift with Dave is repaired only after Dave confesses to spiking Ben's drink the night of the murder. Together, they retrace Ben's steps. Cornell begins to consider other suspects.

By this time, Ben's marriage has fallen apart. After sleeping with Jess once more, Ben discovers she is bipolar and is convinced she is the killer and wrongly assumes she has now kidnapped Abby. She counters with a false accusation of rape.

Independently of each other, Cornell and Ben discover the awful truth that Abby killed Tom. She confesses to her family that it was an accident, a failed plan to hide Tom for a short while to make it appear he was missing, to induce Scott to come home and prevent her father leaving Christy for Jess.

Ben decides to confess to the murder to protect Abby, despite the protestations of Cornell, who is convinced Abby will kill again and vows to put her away. Abby reveals her plan all along had been to drown Tom, in the hope it would make Jess move away.

In season two, Ben is revealed to have been killed in jail. However, his innocence came to light afterwards. These facts have apparently put a stain on Cornell's reputation as a detective. It is unknown as of yet whether or not Abby was revealed to be Tom's real killer or if she succeeded in evading justice.

=== Season two ===
Eric Warner (Michael Ealy), a newly married heir to his family's private equity firm, is under suspicion from Detective Cornell when his wife Kate (Jordana Brewster) is murdered.

== Cast ==
=== Main ===
==== Season 1 ====
- Ryan Phillippe as Ben Crawford
- Juliette Lewis as Detective Andrea Cornell
- KaDee Strickland as Christine 'Christy' Crawford
- Natalie Martinez as Jessica 'Jess' Murphy
- Dan Fogler as Dave Lindsey
- Indiana Evans as Natalie Crawford
- Belle Shouse as Abby Crawford

==== Season 2 ====
- Michael Ealy as Eric Warner
- Juliette Lewis as Detective Andrea Cornell
- Jordana Brewster as Kate Warner
- Mekia Cox as Amanda Warner
- Charlie Barnett as Patrick Warner
- Kenny Johnson as Danny
- Terry O'Quinn as John Warner

=== Recurring ===
==== Season 1 ====
- Michael Beach as Arthur Fenton
- Steven Brand as Joseph Richardson
- Kate Ashfield as Vanessa Richardson
- Benny Ciaramello as Scott Murphy
- Greg Alan Williams as Kevin Haynes
- Denise Dowse as Elaine Williams
- Meaghan Rath as Nicole Mullen
- Melissa Gilbert as Lisa Daly

==== Season 2 ====
- AnnaLynne McCord as Melanie Warner
- Eric Winter as Neil Oliver
- McNally Sagal as May Stone
- David James Elliott as Major Bryant
- Brendan Hines as Detective Ralston
- Edwin Hodge as Dr. Greg Young

== Production ==
Secrets and Lies was given its initial 10-episode series commitment in October 2013. Barbie Kligman was brought in as executive producer and showrunner while the producers from the original series, Tracey Robertson and Nathan Mayfield, serve as executive producers. On May 9, 2014, Secrets and Lies was picked up by ABC to air as a mid-season entry during the 2014–15 season.

An additional scene from the season 1 finale was made available online, set 14 months after the rest of the episode, with Natalie clearing Ben's name.

== Episodes ==
=== Series overview ===
Season	Episodes	Originally released	
Season	Episodes	First released	Last released
1	10	March 1, 2015	May 3, 2015
2	10	September 25, 2016	December 4, 2016

=== Season 1 (2015) ===
No. overall	No. in season	Title	Cornell Confidential webisode	Directed by	Written by	Original release date	U.S. viewers (millions)
1	1	"The Trail"	Christy	Charles McDougall	Barbie Kligman	March 1, 2015	6.06
Ben Crawford finds five-year-old Tom Murphy's body in some woods near his neighborhood. Detective Andrea Cornell initially thinks Ben is guilty of killing Tom, and the media quickly stakes out the Crawford home. His wife Christy's divorce lawyer assists Ben, who later takes Cornell on the route he took the morning he found Tom. She continues to question him regarding his memory and inquires about his repeated calls to Jess Murphy, Tom's mother. Returning home, he finds the police searching his property. Christy gave them permission. Ben finds it difficult maintaining his job as a painter, as he has become a professional outcast. After finally submitting to a DNA test, Ben learns from Cornell that he is Tom's father.
2	2	"The Father"	Head of Crime Lab	Timothy Busfield	Barbie Kligman	March 1, 2015	6.06
Ben and Jess discuss Tom and the murder. She believes Scott, Tom's father, killed him and would have killed Ben, had it been made known about the paternity. The coroner confirms the cause of death to be blunt trauma from a flashlight (of which Ben's happens to be missing). Against his lawyer's advice, Ben submits to a polygraph test, which is inconclusive. Ben breaks up an argument between Jess and Scott, only to be punched and choked by him. Ben presses Cornell to question Scott about the murder. Later after Christy hesitantly gives permission, Ben consoles Jess, who is planning Tom's funeral. She tries to kiss him, but he pulls away. Cornell tells Ben that, because of a leak, the press now knows that Ben is Tom's father. Ben's family is shocked at the news. He speaks with daughter Abby about it, and she cries. Christy confronts Ben about the night of Tom's conception, when she and the girls were at her brother's house following a fight with Ben, right after her abortion. Ben later wakes on the couch to see Scott standing above him. Scott threatens to kill him, if Ben does not get sent to prison.
3	3	"The Affair"	Dave/Cornell	Paul McCrane	Andrew Wilder	March 8, 2015	5.96
Ben tells Jess that Scott knew Tom's paternity before it was announced. Jess tells Ben that she only told her sister Nicole about it. They find Nicole and Scott in bed together. Cornell gets involved, but she still suspects Ben. As the Crawfords and Dave set up Christmas lights in the house, Ben finds his flashlight with blood on it in his truck and hides it in his garage. Later, upon returning home from a run, he sees Cornell and Christy entering the garage. Cornell wants to see a receipt for the flashlight to help eliminate him as a suspect. When she leaves, Ben and Christy argue, and he later hides the flashlight by gift-wrapping it in a box. He goes to Tom's gravesite and Scott arrives to say Nicole was his alibi, and he didn't want to come forward and hurt Jess. Ben insists he didn't kill Tom and they make peace. At home, Ben sees that Christy had bought a pregnancy test. She refuses to discuss it. Ben admits to Dave that the flashlight came back. Dave reveals he can hear everything through their bathroom window. He insinuates believing the pregnancy test is Natalie's, and Ben looks for her. With Dave and Abby, Ben goes to a party to find Natalie, whom he confronts and intends to take home. A fight ensues and a drunken Natalie alludes that Ben's a killer. When Natalie refuses to get in the car with Ben, Dave accompanies her, while Ben and Abby walk home. The next day, Ben tells Christy he knows the test was for Natalie and she invites him to sleep in their bedroom again. Cornell arrives, showing Ben and Christy footage from when he threatened someone at the party. Cornell needs a statement from Dave, so Ben goes to get him at the guest house. He notices Natalie's party glitter all over Dave's chest and, upon finding evidence Natalie stayed over, throws him out of the house in front of Cornell.
4	4	"The Sister"	Fenton	Kate Dennis	Alfonso H. Moreno	March 15, 2015	5.45
Ben learns that, two nights before Tom died, babysitter Natalie left him with the neighboring Richardsons to attend a concert. Vanessa Richardson tells Ben that their own son Malcolm died. Ben finds some police report photos of Malcolm with bruises. Vanessa later explains that Malcolm had hemophilia, and his visible bruises were publicly presumed to be from parental abuse. He was taken from them, and his new family beat him repeatedly, causing his death. Meanwhile, Cornell confronts Ben about his drunk dialing Jess the night Tom died. He mistakenly called a wrong number and left an ominous voicemail, now in Cornell's possession. Ben also still cannot remember what happened that night.
5	5	"The Jacket"	Col. Gwen Anderson	Adam Arkin	Pamela Davis	March 22, 2015	5.56
Ben calls Dave to ask if he indeed called Jess from the bar that night. Dave cannot remember that evening's events. Ben sees and pursues Matt Daly when he runs into the woods. Matt drops a blue jacket stained with blood. Ben helps him home in the rain. Matt's mother Lisa greets them with an umbrella but doesn't answer Ben's questions about the jacket, which disappeared before Ben returns for it. He later finds Matt's brother Tyler, smoking and with visible cuts on his hands, in the woods. Ben suspects him as the killer when Dave mentions Tyler's drug addiction. The next morning, Christy's car is vandalized, with the word "Guilty" written on the side of it. Ben finds a cigarette near the car and later sees a trail of blood leading to his garage. He discovers dozens of flashlights carefully placed in rows inside. Cornell quickly arrives, responding to a text he sent her. When he says he didn't send it, she asks him to step away from the crime scene. Ben barges into the Daly house to talk to Matt, who has an escalating violent episode. Tyler arrives to calm down his brother. Ben now thinks Matt killed Tom. Lisa initially tries to cover for Tyler, but he reveals that he crashed his car while drunk and is in hiding, with her help. Cornell later tells Ben that Matt couldn't have been the murderer, as it was raining the night of the murder. According to Lisa, Matt hates the rain and tries to avoid it. Also, his GPS bracelet shows he was at home sleeping at the time of the murder. Later, Cornell finds the vandal – Natalie's boyfriend, Cooper, who confesses to tagging their fence and messing up Christy's car. He was angry at Ben for not allowing him to see Natalie, and he apologizes. Ben assumes the ordeal is over, but Cornell states that the flashlight incident is unrelated. Ben later receives a threatening text from an anonymous sender, who also remotely locks him into his car.
6	6	"The Confession"	Michael	Kate Dennis	Chitra Elizabeth Samprath	March 29, 2015	5.15
After escaping his vehicle, Ben is told by Cornell that someone highly skilled hacked its security system. She offers him police protection, but he declines, viewing that as her way to enhance his arrest. Ben later receives a video text of him sleeping in his room with audio of his conversation with Dave about the flashlight. Cornell's team finds a military-grade covert camera. Ben stays with Dave at his new apartment, while the team inspects the house and protects his family. Ben relates to Dave when he had the affair with Jess and Tom was conceived. It was at the Haynes' Fourth of July barbecue, which Ben attended alone and Kevin caught them having sex. Kevin later abducts Ben from outside Dave's and tries to scare him into confessing to Tom's murder, by torturing him. Kevin reveals that his own wife, Elaine, cheated on him while he was serving in Kuwait. Ben manages to briefly escape and call Cornell on Kevin's cell phone. She soon arrives to arrest Kevin and to also tell Ben that she knew Kevin was his stalker. Back home, Ben is asked by reporter-neighbor Arthur Fenton to help take down Cornell.
7	7	"The Cop"	Dr. Barrett	Nick Copus	Judith McCreary	April 12, 2015	4.85
Fenton convinces Ben to assist him in bringing down Cornell. Ben visits Jennifer Barrett in jail. He is surprised to see the likes of her there, and she reveals that Cornell is her mother. Jennifer tells him about Seth Goring, the prime suspect in the murder of a little girl. She advises Ben to confess. After hearing Ben visited Jennifer, Cornell brings him into a room filled with evidence from the crime scene, attempting to scare him into a confession. Ben realizes that this is Cornell's personal payback for visiting the jail. He visits Mrs. Goring, whom he had seen arguing with Cornell, to learn Seth committed suicide; his son had evidence of the murder. The Crawfords attend Michael's holiday party with gifts, one of which is the wrapped flashlight that Ben disposes of in the nearby woods. A search team later combs the woods and Ben spots Linda, the police's leak in the crime lab. Fenton is arrested for paying Linda for Tom's DNA info. The recent secrecy causes Christy to take the kids to her brother's house. Cornell visits Ben to show him a video from a taxi of Ben going to Jess' house the night Tom died.
8	8	"The Son"	Christy/Natalie/Abby	Laura Innes	Andrew Wilder	April 19, 2015	5.13
After trying to visit his girls for Christmas, and Christy refusing him, Ben spends the day with Dave, reexamining what happened the night Tom was killed. Dave gives Ben the flashlight, revealing he had dug it up and saved Ben from going to prison, and they destroy it. Dave tells Ben that he sedated him at the bar the night Tom was killed. Ben learns that, that night, he was waving around a picture of his terminated baby, which is why Cornell thought he knew Tom was his son. Ben then finds Tom's tooth in his pocket, which leads him to remember everything that happened that night. He also remembers that the call he placed that night, thinking it was Jess, was to let her know that he was sorry if Christy had confronted her about their affair. He then reveals to Cornell that he walked towards Tom's house because he saw Tom's tricycle laying in the driveway and moved it. Intending to tell Jess about Christy, should she confront her the next day, he sees her asleep and lets himself in. Tom awakes because he had lost a tooth, so Ben puts him in bed and takes the tooth for the tooth fairy. Cornell states that his admission does not prove his innocence. He agrees but is happy that he knows that he did not kill Tom. Back home, he receives a phone call from his attorney, telling him that the $25,000 received as payment was from Christy. Ben states that they do not have money, and the attorney implies Christy's guilt. Ben is told that, if she gets divorced, she is not going to give him any money, leading Ben to search the house to find tens of thousands of dollars.
9	9	"The Mother"	Elaine/Cornell	Matt Penn	Pamela Davis & Judith McCreary	April 26, 2015	5.83
Cornell believes that Ben did not kill Tom. She re-examines the crime scene and questions Christy, who is now dating another man. Christy tells Cornell to leave. Ben takes Abby to the fireworks show and Jess tags along. Abby thinks that Ben loves Jess, according to Christy, and dislikes that she has Ben's attention. When Ben cannot take Abby home, she gets upset that she can't stay with Ben. She becomes emotional and says that Christy was right about Ben not loving her or Natalie but only loves Jess. Jess invites Ben into her house, which leads to sex. While she is in the shower, he sees a picture of her in the blue jacket, which prompts Ben to look for it, only to find her medication bottles stashed in her room. He takes two bottles to learn that they're used to treat bipolar disorder and schizophrenia (antipsychotic medications). He also discovers it could lead to anger outbreaks. With the key to her house, he looks for more clues and discovers she had another infant baby that died within a year. Jess finds him and becomes enraged and violent. He hurriedly leaves her house. Christy calls to tell him that Abby is missing. He panics and frantically searches for Abby. He sees Jess, who then locks him out of his house and asks, "How does it feel to lose your daughter?". Cornell finally receives information regarding the killer, which is a female.
10	10	"The Lie"	14 Months Later...	Timothy Busfield	Barbie Kligman & Judith McCreary	May 3, 2015	6.53
Ben searches for Abby, even breaking into Jess's house to do so and gets arrested. Jess has pressed rape charges against him. Cornell is shown the blue jacket, found in the house. At the station, Ben insists that he didn't rape Jess. Cornell tells him that she knows he didn't have the jacket nor that he killed Tom. Abby then calls him to say that she just wanted to be alone. Cornell questions Jess and ultimately tells her that she is being framed. At home, Ben gives Christy the signed divorce papers. He later finds bloody sneakers in an air vent, Abby's sneakers. Abby confesses, saying it was an accident and that she planned on running away with Tom, due to each of their turbulent households. In the woods, Tom wanted to return home and she panicked, accidentally striking him with the flashlight. Ben then intends to protect his family by sending them away and turning himself in. However, Cornell knows Abby killed Tom and tries to talk a stubborn Ben out of it, revealing the murder was much more violent than Abby had let on, but he still refuses. Traveling on the road, Christy comforts Abby, but is shocked when her daughter mentions that Jess should've moved after Tom's death. Abby then states that none of this would've happened had she gotten Tom to the river.

=== Season 2 (2016) ===
No. overall	No. in season	Title	Cornell Confidential webisode	Directed by	Written by	Original release date	U.S. viewers (millions)
11	1	"The Fall"	Mr. Dorsey	Adam Arkin	Barbie Kligman	September 25, 2016	4.06
12	2	"The Husband"	Special Assignment	Patrick Norris	Joe Halpin & Judith McCreary	October 2, 2016	3.69
13	3	"The Liar"	Tracking Kate's Son	Constantine Makris	Pamela Davis & Noah Nelson	October 16, 2016	3.46
14	4	"The Detective"	Amanda's Husband	Rob J. Greenlea	Chitra Elizabeth Sampath & Andrew Wilder	October 23, 2016	3.07
15	5	"The Daughter"	Mrs. Stone	Michael Fields	Story by : Joe Halpin; Teleplay by : Joe Halpin & Barbie Kligman	October 30, 2016	2.67
16	6	"The Parent"	Vice	Tommy Lohmann	Judith McCreary	November 6, 2016	2.83
17	7	"The Statement"	Ken Turk	J. Miller Tobin	Pamela Davis	November 13, 2016	3.18
18	8	"The Racket"	Melanie's Photos	Nicole Rubio	Noah Nelson & Chitra Elizabeth Sampath	November 27, 2016	2.81
19	9	"The Brother"	Sanchez Meets Danny	Liz Friedlander	Andrew Wilder	December 4, 2016	3.42
20	10	"The Truth"	32 Months Later...	Adam Arkin	Barbie Kligman & Judith McCreary	December 4, 2016	3.42

=== Web episodes ===
Cornell: Confidential is a web series by ABC Studios and Disney/ABC Digital Media Studios which accompanies the television series. Each webisode was released online after the television episode aired and gives additional clues told from the perspective of Detective Cornell.

== Reception ==
=== Season 1 (2015) ===
No.	Title	Air date	Rating/share (18–49)	Viewers (millions)	DVR (18–49)	DVR viewers (millions)	Total (18–49)	Total viewers (millions)
1	"The Trail"	March 1, 2015	1.5/4	6.06	0.9	—N/a	2.4	—N/a
2	"The Father"	March 1, 2015	1.5/4	6.06	0.9	—N/a	2.4	—N/a
3	"The Affair"	March 8, 2015	1.4/4	5.96	0.8	2.39	2.2	8.35
4	"The Sister"	March 15, 2015	1.4/4	5.45	1.0	2.75	2.4	8.21
5	"The Jacket"	March 22, 2015	1.5/4	5.56	0.8	2.47	2.3	8.03
6	"The Confession"	March 29, 2015	1.3/4	5.15	1.0	2.51	2.3	7.66
7	"The Cop"	April 12, 2015	1.3/4	4.85	0.9	2.66	2.2	7.41
8	"The Son"	April 19, 2015	1.5/4	5.13	0.8	2.49	2.3	7.62
9	"The Mother"	April 26, 2015	1.7/5	5.83	—N/a	—N/a	—N/a	—N/a
10	"The Lie"	May 3, 2015	1.8/5	6.53	—N/a	—N/a	—N/a	—N/a

=== Season 2 (2016) ===
No.	Title	Air date	Rating/share (18–49)	Viewers (millions)	DVR (18–49)	DVR viewers (millions)	Total (18–49)	Total viewers (millions)
1	"The Fall"	September 25, 2016	1.0/3	4.06	TBA	TBA	TBA	TBA
2	"The Husband"	October 2, 2016	0.9/3	3.69	TBA	TBA	TBA	TBA
3	"The Liar"	October 16, 2016	0.9/3	3.46	TBA	TBA	TBA	TBA
4	"The Detective"	October 23, 2016	0.7/2	3.07	TBA	TBA	TBA	TBA
5	"The Daughter"	October 30, 2016	0.6/2	2.67	TBA	TBA	TBA	TBA
6	"The Parent"	November 6, 2016	0.6/2	2.83	TBA	TBA	TBA	TBA
7	"The Statement"	November 13, 2016	0.7/2	3.18	TBA	TBA	TBA	TBA
8	"The Racket"	November 27, 2016	0.7/2	2.81	TBA	TBA	TBA	TBA
9	"The Brother"	December 4, 2016	0.7/2	3.42	TBA	TBA	TBA	TBA
10	"The Truth"	December 4, 2016	0.7/2	3.42	TBA	TBA	TBA	TBA

=== Critical reception ===
Secrets and Lies has received mixed criticism when season one came out. On Rotten Tomatoes, it received a 36% approval rating, with a rating average of 4.7/10, based on 30 reviews. Its critical consensus reads: "While some may find its limited intrigue compelling, Secrets and Lies is ultimately undone by wooden performances, excessive red herrings, and bad scripts." On Metacritic, it scored 48 out of 100, based on 22 "mixed or average" reviews.

=== Controversy ===
On March 16, 2015, ABC and the show's producers came under fire from the bleeding disorder community for portraying hemophilia as an incestuous disease with Michael Beach's character stating: "Hemophilia is the nasty byproduct of incest." A petition for a public apology was started on Change.org. In subsequent airings of the episode, the line was removed, but ABC published no formal apology.

== International broadcast ==
- The series premiered in Germany on Universal TV on March 10, 2015. The second season aired from June 20 to August 22, 2016.
- The series premiered in India on Zee Café on April 11, 2015.
- The series premiered in France on M6 on November 5, 2015.
- The series premiered in Turkey on Dizimax Drama.
- The series premiered in Brazil on Globo on October 17, 2016.
- The series premiered in Italy on Rai 4 on September 13, 2015.
- The series premiered in Finland on 13th Street on June 1, 2015.
