= Sally Mortemore =

English actress

Sally Mortemore is an English stage, film and television actress. She appeared in Harry Potter and the Chamber of Secrets, where she played Madame Pince, the librarian of Hogwarts.

== Career ==
Mortemore first worked in theatre as an acting assistant stage manager at the Queen's Theatre in Hornchurch followed by seasons at the Haymarket Theatre in Basingstoke, Watford's Palace Theatre, Bolton's Octagon Theatre and the Churchill Theatre in Bromley, London. She also toured with the David Glass Ensemble, Redshift, Cleanbreak Theatre Company and Great Eastern Stage.

Mortemore appeared as Gertrude in David Glass' production of Gormenghast in 2006/2007. Her film and television appearances include White Heat BBC2/ITV (2012), Ollie Kepler's Expanding Purple World (2010), Salt Grain (2010), Dead Gorgeous, Too Many Cooks, Harry Potter and the Chamber of Secrets as Madame Pince and Wire in the Blood and Daphne & Apollo for the BBC as directed by Clare Kilner.

In 2016, she portrayed a Braavosi woman in the HBO series Game of Thrones in Season 6.

== Filmography ==
Year	Title	Role	Notes
2002	Harry Potter and the Chamber of Secrets	Madam Irma Pince	
2010	Ollie Kepler's Expanding Purple World	Interviewer 2	
2018	Aux	Mrs. Roberts	
