= White Heat (TV series) =

2012 British TV series

- Written by: Paula Milne
- Directed by: John Alexander
- Starring: Lindsay Duncan; Michael Kitchen
- No. of episodes: 6

Production
- Executive producers: Kate Bartlett; Paula Milne; Lucy Richer
- Producer: Elinor Day
- Cinematography: Matt Gray BSC
- Editor: Roy Sharman
- Running time: 60 minutes

Original release
- Network: BBC Two
- Release: 8 March – 12 April 2012

White Heat is a British television drama series, written by Paula Milne, and first broadcast on BBC Two from 8 March to 12 April 2012. The series follows seven students who first meet in a London, Tufnell Park flatshare in 1965 and consists of six one-hour episodes, set in 1965, 1967, 1973, 1979, 1982 and 1990.

The series was trailed in Radio Times with an article titled Our Friends in the South, an echo of Peter Flannery's 1996 television series Our Friends in the North. Milne herself rejected a direct comparison, however; "Our Friends in the North was absolutely seminal. But it didn't have a lot to do with women, and it didn't have a lot to do with race, and it didn't have a lot to do with sexual politics." Milne, who had experience of both the Central School of Art and Design and the Royal College of Art in the mid-1960s, said her experience most tallied with that of the character Lilly (MyAnna Buring).

"The mix of the personal and the political is framed by a flash-forward to the present day, in which the house is revisited by the former friends after one of their number dies and makes them the executors of his or her will." The identity of the dead character is withheld until the final episode.

Milne has said she thinks its theme is "the disappointment of the Left. [...] Edward, Jack's father, says to Jack during the 1979 episode (when Margaret Thatcher is elected), that 'this is the end of consensus politics and it's you guys who opened the door and let her in. Just remember that'. Fucking right they did. Excuse my French."

The title of the sixth episode comes from the nickname for the Japanese forest Aokigahara.

== Episodes ==
- The Past Is a Foreign Country – 8 March 2012
- Eve of Destruction – 15 March 2012
- The Dark Side of the Moon – 22 March 2012
- The Personal Is Political – 29 March 2012
- The Eye of the Needle – 5 April 2012
- The Sea of Trees – 12 April 2012

== Cast ==
Character	Young	Old
Lily	MyAnna Buring	Lindsay Duncan
Jack Walsh	Sam Claflin	Michael Kitchen
Alan	Lee Ingleby	Paul Copley
Orla	Jessica Gunning	Sorcha Cusack
Charlotte Pew	Claire Foy	Juliet Stevenson
Jay	Reece Ritchie	Ramon Tikaram
Victor	David Gyasi	Hugh Quarshie

=== Supporting cast ===
- Beth Pew – Tamsin Greig
- Miles – Richard Lintern
- Edward Walsh – Jeremy Northam
- Derek Bowden – Julian Barratt
- Val – Karen Henthorn
- Frank – Geoff Leesley
- Leo – Euan MacNaughton
- Boris – Tim Barlow
- Alec – William Bliss
- Alicia – Rebecca Calder
- Stephen – Brendan Foster
- Saaghoor – Abhin Galeya
- Emma – Abigail Guiver
- TJ – Emma Hartley-Miller
- Granger – Adam Leese
- Gareth – Jonathan Readwin
- Aasif – Akshay Kumar
- Nancy – Sally Mortemore
- Connor – Andrew Simpson
- Ewan – Christian Roe
- Owen – Adam Woodroffe
- Leah – Holly Weston

== Music used in the series ==
=== Episode One ===
- Jimi Hendrix – Purple Haze
- Petula Clark – Downtown
- The Who – My Generation
- The Yardbirds – For Your Love
- The McCoys – Hang On Sloopy
- The Kinks – You Really Got Me
- The Velvelettes – Needle in a Haystack
- Roger Miller – King of the Road
- The Hollies – Here I Go Again

=== Episode Two ===
- The Pretty Things – S.F. Sorrow
- The Spencer Davis Group – Gimme Some Lovin
- Bob Dylan – The Times They Are a-Changin'
- Elton John – Saturday Night's Alright For Fighting
- Procol Harum – A Whiter Shade of Pale
- Tomorrow – My White Bicycle
- The Hollies – Carrie Anne
- Jimi Hendrix – Voodoo Child (Slight Return)

=== Episode Three ===
- Pink Floyd – Eclipse
- David Bowie – The Jean Genie
- The Specials – Too Much Too Young

=== Episode Four ===
- The Clash – London Calling
- Queen – Don't Stop Me Now
- Elvis Costello – Oliver's Army
- The Specials – Too Much Too Young
- Roxy Music – Dance Away
- Ian Dury & the Blockheads – Hit Me with Your Rhythm Stick
- Candi Staton – Young Hearts Run Free
- A Taste of Honey – Boogie Oogie Oogie
- The Trammps – Disco Inferno
- Sylvester – You Make Me Feel (Mighty Real)
- ABC – Tears Are Not Enough

=== Episode Five ===
- ABC – All of My Heart
- Spandau Ballet – Chant No. 1 (I Don't Need This Pressure On)
- Culture Club – Do You Really Want to Hurt Me?
- Happy Mondays – Step On

=== Episode Six ===
- Sinéad O'Connor – Nothing Compares 2 U

== Filming locations ==
Although notionally set in Tufnell Park, exterior shots of the house were filmed in Avenue Park Road, Tulse Hill, on the other side of London. The property has subsequently been refurbished, and as of April 2011 was for sale at £1.6 million.
