= Rebecca Calder =

English actress

- Born: Consett, County Durham
- Occupation: actor

Rebecca Calder is an English actress. Her films include Altar (2014), Love Me Do (2015), for which she won Best Actress at the European Independent Film Festival, The Dark Mile (2017), and The Conjuring: Last Rites (2025).

== Early life ==
Calder was born in Consett, County Durham. She moved around growing up and was educated in New Zealand and Australia. At nineteen, she returned to England, moving from Naples, Italy to London where she now lives in Ealing.

== Career ==
In 2007, Calder made her professional stage debut in Silver Birch House and Pera Palas, both at the Arcola Theatre in East London. This was followed by her television debut in four episodes of the BBC One medical drama Casualty the following year. She also appeared in Moonlight & Magnolias at the Tricycle Theatre. She made guest appearances in the third series of the ITV science fiction series Primeval as well as The Bill and Doctors, also on ITV and BBC One respectively.

Calder played Martha McCoy in the 2012 History miniseries Hatfields & McCoys and guest starred in an episode of the BBC Two drama White Heat. She made her feature film debut in the 2014 horror thriller Altar, which aired on Channel 5 in the United Kingdom and had a theatrical release elsewhere. She received critical acclaim for her performance alongside Jack Gordon in the 2015 film Love Me Do, for which she won Best Actress at the ÉCU European Independent Film Festival and the Cardiff Independent Film Festival. Calder would return to the ÉCU to sit on the jury in 2019.

Calder starred alongside Deirdre Mullins in the film The Dark Mile and portrayed Coco Chanel in the Picasso installment of the National Geographic anthology series Genius.

Calder had a recurring role as Shirley in Michaela Coel's BBC and HBO miniseries I May Destroy You. In 2022, Calder appeared in the action film Memory and the Swedish historical film Hilma. She is set to star in the horror film Broken Bird (announced as Sybil).

== Filmography ==
=== Film ===
List of films and roles
Year	Title	Role	Notes
2009	Ilk	Ilk	Short film
2011	The Division of Gravity	Girl	Short film
2014	Altar	Isabella	
2015	Youth	Countess	
2015	Love Me Do	Antonia	
2016	The Sea Is an Edge and an Ending	Miranda	Short film
2017	We Are Tourists	Georgie	
2017	King Arthur: Legend of the Sword	Maid	
2017	The Dark Mile	Louise	
2017	Cupidity	Bridget	Short film
2018	Holmes & Watson	Ma'am	
2019	Tickle	Lilly	Short film
2021	The Cursed	Mrs Adam	
2021	Wrath of Man	Amy	
2022	Memory	Wendy van Camp	
2022	Hilma	Cornelia	
2023	A House in Jerusalem	Rachel	
2023	Kandahar	Corrine Harris	Voice role
2024	Broken Bird	Sybil	
2025	The Conjuring: Last Rites	Janet Smurl	
2025	Odyssey	Sophie Graves	

=== Television ===
List of television appearances and roles
Year	Title	Role	Notes
2008–2010	Casualty	Briony Grove / Chrissie McAllister	4 episodes
2009	Primeval	Lady Elizabeth Lionel	Episode: "Dragon Tales"
2009	The Bill	Layla Madeley	Episode: "Absolute Power"
2011	Doctors	Kay Burridge	Episode: "The Nun's Tale"
2012	White Heat	Alicia	Miniseries; episode: "The Sea of Trees"
2012	Hatfields & McCoys	Martha McCoy	Miniseries; 2 episodes
2012	Dark Matters: Twisted But True	Various	3 episodes
2014	DCI Banks	Chelsea	2 episodes
2014	Love by Design	Beatrix	Television film
2015	Clan of the Cave Bear	Ebra	Television film
2016	Fright Bites		Miniseries; episode: "Wake"
2017	Silent Witness	DI Jodie Tanner	2 episodes
2018	Genius: Picasso	Coco Chanel	Anthology: "Chapter Eight"
2020	I May Destroy You	Shirley	Miniseries; 2 episodes
2021	Wolfe	Martha Gik	1 episode
2022	Professor T	Nicky Stevens	Episode: "Swansong"

== Stage ==
List of stage performances
Year	Title	Role	Notes
2007	Silver Birch House	Serap	Arcola Theatre, London
2007	Pera Palas	Evelyn	Arcola Theatre, London
2008	Moonlight & Magnolias	Miss Poppenghul	Tricycle Theatre, London
2020	The Effect	Dr Lomas	English Theatre, Frankfurt

== Awards and nominations ==
Year	Award	Category	Work	Result	Ref.
2016	European Independent Film Festival	Best Actress	Love Me Do	Won	
2016	Unrestricted View Film Festival	Best Actress	Love Me Do	Won	
2016	Cardiff Independent Film Festival	Best Actress	Love Me Do	Won	
2016	Idyllwild International Festival of Cinema	Best Actress – Feature	Love Me Do	Nominated	
2017	Raindance Film Festival	Best UK Feature	The Dark Mile	Nominated	(Note: Shared with cast and crew.)
