= Beowulf: Return to the Shieldlands =

2016 British TV series

- Opening title
- Genre: Fantasy; Drama; Adventure
- Created by: Tim Haines; Katie Newman
- Based on: Beowulf by Anonymous
- Developed by: James Dormer; Tim Haines; Katie Newman
- Directed by: Jon East; Julian Holmes; Marek Losey; Stephen Woolfenden; Kerric Macdonald
- Starring: David Ajala; Kieran Bew; Lee Boardman; David Bradley; Lolita Chakrabarti; Elliot Cowan; Laura Donnelly; Holly Earl; Allison McKenzie
- Composers: Rob Lane; Jonny Sims; Will Rice
- Country of origin: United Kingdom
- Original language: English
- No. of series: 1
- No. of episodes: 12 (13 Commissioned)

Production
- Executive producers: James Dormer; Tim Haines; Katie Newman
- Producer: Stephen Smallwood
- Cinematography: Owen McPolin; Mike Spragg; James Friend; Jean-Philippe Gossart; James Welland
- Running time: 46 minutes approx (exc. adverts)
- Production company: ITV Studios

Original release
- Network: ITV
- Release: 3 January – 20 March 2016

Beowulf: Return to the Shieldlands is a British epic fantasy drama television series broadcast by ITV. It was created by James Dormer, Tim Haines and Katie Newman. Dormer wrote the series based on the poem Beowulf and executive-produced it along with Haines and Newman, while Stephen Smallwood produced the series. The series began airing in the United Kingdom on 3 January 2016 and in the United States from 23 January 2016.

Shortly after the series began, ITV announced that it would not be renewed for a second series.

== Plot ==
Beowulf returns to Heorot to find that Hrothgar, his adoptive father, is dead. Hrothgar's wife, Rheda, who had favoured her own son over the young Beowulf, is named his successor. Beowulf's step-brother, Slean, is furious, both because of his return and for not himself being named Thane.

Rheda, now regent, must show strength while scheming for the support of other village heads, in order to gain the title of Jarl (a rank above Thane)—a title some are willing to kill for.

Meanwhile, the reeve is found dead. Beowulf is initially blamed, but manages to prove it is the work of a dreaded skinshifter.

== Cast ==
=== Main cast ===
- Kieran Bew as Beowulf
- Lee Boardman as Hane
- David Bradley as Gorrik
- Lolita Chakrabarti as Lila
- Elliot Cowan as Abrican
- Laura Donnelly as Elvina
- Holly Earl as Kela
- Gísli Örn Garðarsson as Breca
- David Harewood as Scorann
- Edward Hogg as Varr
- William Hurt as Hrothgar
- Ian Puleston-Davies as Lagrathorn
- Edward Speleers as Slean
- Ellora Torchia as Vishka
- Joanne Whalley as Rheda
- David Ajala as Rate
- Sarah MacRae as Saray

=== Other cast ===
- Susan Aderin as (smelter) Kendra
- Ace Bhatti
- Richard Brake as Arak
- Claire-Louise Cordwell
- Grégory Fitoussi as Razzak
- Jefferson Hall as (Wulfing chief) Jogan
- Jack Hollington as Young Beowulf
- George Kent as Young Slean
- Allison McKenzie as Arla
- Itoya Osagiede as (Kendra's son) Tarn
- Kirsty Oswald
- Alex Price
- Jack Rowan
- Emmett J. Scanlan as (Jogan's brother) Skellan
- Joe Sims
- Jack Smith as Red

== Episodes ==
The series was originally commissioned and produced for ITV in the UK as a thirteen episode series. However, a decision was made to edit down episode 8 and 9 into a new Episode 8, resulting in a reduced twelve episode series. The twelve episode series was broadcast on ITV in early 2016 and was subsequently released as twelve episodes on the UK DVD. The German DVD release retains the series' thirteen episode structure as originally produced.

| No. | Title | Directed by | Written by | Original release date |
|---|---|---|---|---|
| 1 | "Episode 1: The Return" | Jon East | James Dormer | 3 January 2016 (ITV Hub 23 December 2015) |
Beowulf arrives at Heorot to discover that Hrothgar the thanedom ruler, and the man who adopted him after his father's death, has died.
| 2 | "Episode 2: The Gathering" | Jon East | James Dormer | 10 January 2016 |
A killer is at large in the kingdom, and with other Thanes traveling to a gathering, the pressure is on Beowulf to catch those responsible.
| 3 | "Episode 3" | Julian Holmes | Guy Burt | 17 January 2016 |
When Slean and Scorann vanish, Beowulf and Rate venture into the forest to find him, where Heorot's enemies are still at large. As the Gathering approaches, meanwhile, Rheda's bid for leadership hangs on Scorann's vote.
| 4 | "Episode 4" | Julian Holmes | Michael A Walker | 24 January 2016 |
Rheda must prove herself worthy as ruler of the Shieldlands when war among the tribes threatens the collapse of Heorot.
| 5 | "Episode 5" | Stephen Woolfenden | Guy Burt & Jon Cooksey | 31 January 2016 |
Beowulf and his group travel to the Mere with the weapons promised to Thane Gorrik. They soon discover new dangers await them when the aging Thane welcomes them with hostility, until his daughter falls ill. Beowulf and Breca must then set out to find the cure and save her.
| 6 | "Episode 6" | Colin Teague | Guy Burt | 7 February 2016 |
Beowulf is rebuilding the town's defences when a troll unexpectedly attacks. While he and Breca travel to the forest to stave off further attacks, Slean leaves Heorot and travels to Bregan after overhearing a conversation between Elvina and Beowulf.
| 7 | "Episode 7" | Colin Teague | Guy Burt | 14 February 2016 |
While Beowulf fights off the invading Wulfing tribe, Rheda faces up to Jogan, an enemy from her past. Meanwhile, Abrecan questions whether Slean would be brave enough to betray his mother.
| 8 | "Episode 8" | Stephen Woolfenden & Kerric MacDonald | James Dormer & Michael A. Walker | 21 February 2016 |
As Slean and Kela prepare for their wedding, Abrecan is forced to choose to accept Rheda's new laws which have spread throughout the tribe or take a stand against his sister.
| 9 | "Episode 9" | Cilla Ware | James Dormer | 28 February 2016 |
A romance blossoms between Beowulf and Elvina, but when the two are captured, Elvina is forced to reveal a dark secret from her past.
| 10 | "Episode 10" | Cilla Ware | Jack Lothian | 6 March 2016 |
While Beowulf struggles to come to terms with his relationship with Elvina, Rheda travels to face up to her brother as Heorot's defences are on the brink of collapse.
| 11 | "Episode 11" | Marek Losey | Guy Burt | 13 March 2016 |
Rheda escapes from custody in Bregan, but now faces her biggest threat as Heorot is threatened with invasion by Abrecan's forces.
| 12 | "Episode 12" | Marek Losey | Guy Burt | 20 March 2016 |
The future of Heorot rests on Rheda's shoulders and with the help of Beowulf, stands to fight against her brother's forces.

== Production ==
=== Casting ===
On 12 March 2015, Kieran Bew was cast in the series to play the title role; other cast included William Hurt, Joanne Whalley, Ed Speleers, David Ajala, Ian Puleston-Davies, Ellora Torchia, Gísli Örn Gardarsson, Susan Aderin, Kirsty Oswald, Laura Donnelly, Edward Hogg, Alex Price, Jack Rowan, and Itoya Osagiede. On 17 April 2015, David Harewood was added to the cast. Additional casting was announced on 19 August 2015, including Joe Sims, Lee Boardman, David Bradley, Ace Bhatti, and Grégory Fitoussi.

=== Filming ===
Filming on the series began in April 2015 in Weardale, County Durham. The main outdoor set was built on the site of a former cement works south of Eastgate, which is west of Stanhope. Filming also took place across Northumberland, and a film crew was spotted on the beach at Bamburgh in late April. In June, a set was built in the sand dunes at Druridge Bay, and another on the shoreline of Derwent Reservoir. The main filming studios in the North East were located at the former Dewhirst clothing factory and warehouse, in Blyth, Northumberland.

Kieran Bew said he had started to put down roots in Los Angeles when he was cast in the title role: "It's been incredible to come back home... I got this job and literally ended up working 20 minutes from where I grew up. It's really strange and really lovely to drive to work and see signs like Spennymoor and Darlington."

== Reception ==
The series has received mixed reviews holding a 55 average rating on review aggregator Rotten Tomatoes. Positive reviews have garnered approval for the plot, creature mythology, and writing, with one television critic praising the series for its set design and special effects. Negative reviews have tended to say the series feels too derivative of works like Game of Thrones and The Lord of the Rings. Esquire stated that the show "seems determined to remain true to source material, which involves a lot of glowering, growling and stomping around. That may have been enough two millenniums ago, but in 21st century America, it's a bit of a buzzkill." Ed Power of The Telegraph said of the show, "Cheap-looking special effects, a bland hero and barely any resemblance to the source material makes this Beowulf a flop."
