= Flaked =

2016 American comedy streaming television series

- Promotional release poster
- Genre: Comedy drama
- Created by: Will Arnett; Mark Chappell
- Starring: Will Arnett; David Sullivan; Ruth Kearney; George Basil
- Composer: Stephen Malkmus
- Country of origin: United States
- Original language: English
- No. of seasons: 2
- No. of episodes: 14

Production
- Executive producers: Will Arnett; Mark Chappell; Ben Silverman; Peter Principato; Mitchell Hurwitz
- Production companies: Electric Avenue Productions; A Thousand Words, Ltd.; The Hurwitz Company; Electus; Principato-Young Entertainment

Original release
- Network: Netflix
- Release: March 11, 2016 – June 2, 2017

Flaked is an American comedy-drama television series created by Will Arnett and Mark Chappell. It stars Arnett as Chip, a self-appointed "guru" who falls in love while he and many other members of the ensemble cast struggle with alcoholism and Alcoholics Anonymous. The first season consisted of eight episodes and was released on Netflix on March 11, 2016. In July 2016, the series was renewed for a six-episode second season, which premiered on June 2, 2017.

The show is in-part inspired by Arnett's own struggles with alcoholism. He relapsed while Flaked was in production, and has attested that Alcoholics Anonymous has played a role in reclaiming sobriety.

== Cast ==
=== Main ===
- Will Arnett as Chip
- David Sullivan as Dennis
- Ruth Kearney as London/Claire
- George Basil as "Cooler"/John

=== Recurring ===
- Lina Esco as Kara
- Dennis Gubbins as That Fucking Guy
- Christopher Mintz-Plasse as Topher
- Mike Cochrane as a tattoo artist
- Jeff Daniel Phillips as Uno
- Kirstie Alley as Jackie
- Heather Graham as Tilly
- Seana Kofoed as Vanessa Weiss
- Annika Marks as Brooke
- Jessica Lowe as Widow
- Annabeth Gish as Alicia Wiener
- Robert Wisdom as George Flack
- Travis Mills as Stefan
- Mark Boone Junior as Jerry
- Frankie Shaw as Natasha
- Jim Turner as Chairperson
- Elisabeth Röhm as Alex
- Shawn Hatosy as Karel
- Lenora Crichlow as Rosa

== Episodes ==
=== Series overview ===
Season	Episodes	Originally released
1	8	March 11, 2016
2	6	June 2, 2017

=== Season 1 (2016) ===
No. overall	No. in season	Title	Directed by	Written by	Original release date
1	1	"Westminster"	Wally Pfister	Will Arnett & Mark Chappell	March 11, 2016
2	2	"Horizon"	Wally Pfister	Will Arnett & Mark Chappell	March 11, 2016
3	3	"Rose"	Josh Gordon and Will Speck	Will Arnett & Mark Chappell	March 11, 2016
4	4	"Palms"	Josh Gordon and Will Speck	Will Arnett & Mark Chappell	March 11, 2016
5	5	"Electric"	Tom DiCillo	Will Arnett & Mark Chappell	March 11, 2016
6	6	"Shell"	Tom DiCillo	Will Arnett & Mark Chappell	March 11, 2016
7	7	"7th"	Wally Pfister	Will Arnett & Mark Chappell	March 11, 2016
8	8	"Sunset"	Wally Pfister	Will Arnett & Mark Chappell	March 11, 2016

=== Season 2 (2017) ===
No. overall	No. in season	Title	Directed by	Written by	Original release date
9	1	"Day One"	Michael Patrick Jann	Will Arnett & Mark Chappell	June 2, 2017
10	2	"Day Two"	Michael Patrick Jann	Maggie Rowe	June 2, 2017
11	3	"Day Three"	Mark Chappell	Bobby Bowman	June 2, 2017
12	4	"Day Four"	Will Arnett	Jim Vallely	June 2, 2017
13	5	"Day Five"	Ben Berman	Evan Mann & Gareth Reynolds	June 2, 2017
14	6	"Day Six"	Ben Berman	Will Arnett & Mark Chappell	June 2, 2017

== Reception ==
The first season received poor reviews from critics. On Rotten Tomatoes, the season has an approval rating of 35% based on 31 reviews, with an average rating of 5.12/10. The site's critical consensus reads: "Dull and pointless, Flaked makes it uncomfortably clear that the man-child persona is no longer compelling." On Metacritic, the season has a weighted average score of 43 out of 100, based on 16 critics, indicating "mixed or average reviews".

The show was criticized by Emily VanDerWerff of Vox for "stupid plot twists" and devolving into melodrama.
