= Ruth Kearney =

Irish actress (born 1984)

- Born: Ruth Delia Kearney; London, England
- Education: Trinity College Dublin; Bristol Old Vic
- Occupation: Actress
- Years active: 2009–present
- Spouse: Theo James (m. 2018)
- Children: 2

Ruth Delia Kearney is an Irish actress known for her roles as Jess Parker in Primeval, Daisy in The Following, and London in Flaked.

== Early life ==
Kearney was born in London, England, to Irish parents before relocating to Dublin, Ireland, at five years old. She grew up in Monkstown. She attended St. Andrew's College, Booterstown, and then studied Drama and Classics at Trinity College Dublin, graduating with honours, before training at the Bristol Old Vic Theatre School, graduating in 2009. Her career began in theatre, with performances in productions such as Man of Mode alongside Antonia Thomas and Theo James, On the Razzle, Three Sisters, Oh! What a lovely War! and Othello.

== Career ==
Kearney is known for her leading role as Jess Parker in the science fiction-drama Primeval, Kearney joined the cast in 2011 and appeared in both Series 4 and Series 5 of the show

In 2014, she guest-starred in the FX political thriller Tyrant, playing the role of Katharina.

In 2015 Kearney played the recurring role of Daisy Locke in the third season of the Fox American television psychological thriller series The Following.

She stars as the female lead London in the Netflix original comedy series Flaked alongside Will Arnett. Kearney portrays an attractive newcomer to Venice who gets caught in a love triangle with the characters portrayed by Will Arnett and David Sullivan. The role is Kearney's first major comedy television series. The series premiered on 11 March 2016 with all eight episodes released simultaneously.

Flaked returned for a second reduced season in 2017. Ruth Kearney also guest starred in the first season of ePix's Get Shorty as Becca Morgan; her first episode aired in September 2017.

== Personal life ==
Since 2018 Kearney has been married to English actor Theo James. They met at the Bristol Old Vic Theatre School. The couple have two children.

== Filmography ==
| Year | Title | Role | Notes |
|---|---|---|---|
| 2009 | Gracie! | Miriam | Television film |
| 2010 | Primeval | Jessica 'Jess' Parker | Webisode (5 episodes) |
| 2011–2012 | Primeval | Jessica 'Jess' Parker | TV series (13 episodes) |
| 2011 | Holby City | Jenny Proctor | TV series (2 episodes) |
| 2011 | Fast Freddie, The Widow and Me | Stacey | Television film |
| 2013 | Jet Stream | Angel | Television film |
| 2014 | Tyrant | Katharina | TV series (2 episodes) |
| 2015 | The Following | Daisy | TV series (11 episodes) |
| 2016–2017 | Flaked | London | TV series (14 episodes) |
| 2017 | Get Shorty | Becca Morgan | TV series (3 episodes) |
| 2019 | Sanditon | Eliza Campion | TV series (3 episodes) |
| 2020 | Trouble Will Find Us | Tess | |
| 2020 | Finding Joy | Emer | TV series (6 episodes) |
| 2023 | The Christmas Break | Maeve | |
