= Ben Mansfield =

English actor

- Born: 29 May 1983 (age 41); St Mary's Paddington, London, England
- Education: Gresham's School
- Years active: 2006–present
- Spouse: Victoria Boreham (stage name Vicki Campbell)
- Children: 1

Ben Mansfield (born 29 May 1983) is an English actor, best known for playing Captain Becker in the ITV sci-fi drama Primeval.

== Career ==
Mansfield portrayed Captain Becker in the ITV sci-fi drama Primeval, depicting the Captain of a special unit from the military which works with the ARC. Mansfield was spotted for the role when auditioning for the part of Arthur in the BBC Television series Merlin. Mansfield got down to the final two for the part, losing out to Bradley James. Merlin's casting director, who also worked as casting director for Primeval, suggested that he audition for Captain Becker and he subsequently joined the cast in its third season in 2009.

On 1 July 2014, he announced on Twitter that he will be playing the part of Alex in channel 4's new comedy, 'Not Safe For Work' (formerly named 'CUT').

Mansfield landed a role in the third series of ITV's Endeavour, which aired 3 January 2016.

=== Theatre ===
His theatrical credits include

- French Without Tears by Terence Rattigan (English Touring Theatre) Lead role: Alan Howard
- Jenufa by Timberlake Wertenbaker (Natural Perspective at the Arcola Theatre)
- Much Ado About Nothing by William Shakespeare (The New Shakespeare Company at Regent's Park Open Air Theatre)
- A Midsummer Night's Dream by William Shakespeare (directed by Peter Hall at the Rose Theatre)
- Twelfth Night by William Shakespeare (directed by Peter Hall at The National Theatre)
- Henry IV Parts One and Two by William Shakespeare (playing Hotspur and Pistol)(directed by Peter Hall at The Theatre Royal, Bath.
- One Man, Two Guvnors at The Theatre Royal Haymarket, London
- Relative Values at Theatre Royal, Bath & Harold Pinter Theatre
- Great Britain at the Haymarket Theatre

Mansfield appeared in Noël Coward's Relative Values at The Theatre Royal, Bath, between 12 and 29 June 2013 as 'Don Lucas'. The production, directed by Sir Trevor Nunn toured from Bath to Bristol before transferring to the Harold Pinter Theatre for a limited season from 19 March to 21 June 2014.

In July 2016, it was announced that Mansfield will be playing the role of 'Larry' in Mart Crawley's 'The Boys In the Band'.

== Filmography ==
Year	Film	Role	Notes
2007	Hell Bent for Leather	Owen Oakshott	short
2008	Holby City	Adam Beaman	TV series (Series 10 episode 12 "For Your Consideration")
2009	Mr Nobody	Stefano	
2009-2011	Primeval	Captain Becker	TV series (Main role; 21 episodes)
2015	Not Safe for Work	Alex	TV series (2 episodes: 2015)
2016	Father Brown	Doctor Tony Fairfax	TV Series (Series 4 Episode 6 "The Rod of Asclepius")
2016	Endeavour	Bruce Belborough	TV series (Series 3 Episode 1 "Ride")
2016	Battlefield 1	George Rackham (Voice)	Video Game
2018	Casualty	James Williams	TV series (Series 32 Episode 19)
