= Primeval (TV series) =

British science fiction television series (2007–2011)

- Series 4 and 5 title card
- Genre: Science fiction Drama
- Created by: Tim Haines; Adrian Hodges
- Starring: See List of Primeval characters
- Composers: Dominik Scherrer Series 1–3; James Hannigan Series 3; Angus Moncrieff Series 3; Stephen McKeon Series 4–5
- Country of origin: United Kingdom
- Original language: English
- No. of series: 5
- No. of episodes: 36 (list of episodes)

Production
- Executive producers: Tim Haines; Adrian Hodges Series 2–5; Cameron McAllister Series 2
- Producers: Adrian Hodges Series 1; Cameron McAllister Series 1; Paul Frift Series 2; Tim Bradley Series 3–5; Katie Newman Series 4–5; Donal Geraghty Series 4–5; Rebecca O'Flanagan Series 4–5
- Running time: 45 minutes
- Production companies: Impossible Pictures; ITV Studios; ProSieben; Treasure Entertainment; M6 Films

Original release
- Network: ITV
- Release: 10 February 2007 – 5 February 2011
- Network: Watch
- Release: 24 May – 28 June 2011

Related
- Primeval: New World

Primeval is a British science fiction television series produced for ITV by Impossible Pictures. Primeval follows a team of scientists tasked with investigating the appearance of temporal anomalies across the United Kingdom through which prehistoric and futuristic creatures enter the present, while simultaneously trying to stop a terrorist plot to bring about the end of the world. Primeval was created by Tim Haines, who previously created the Walking with... documentary series, and Adrian Hodges. It ran for five series, originally broadcast from 2007 to 2011.

The idea for Primeval had originally been devised by Haines in the early 2000s, in the aftermath of the production of Walking with Dinosaurs. Originally intended as a production for the BBC, Primeval was ultimately turned down in 2005 after several years of concepting due to being deemed too similar to the revived Doctor Who by executives. Haines and Hodges then approached ITV, who were enthusiastic about the project. Before its initial broadcast, many early commentators dismissed Primeval as a Doctor Who ripoff. Despite this, the first series of Primeval met with an enthusiastic response, becoming both a critical and an audience hit. Also successful with international audiences, Primeval overcame its early dismissals and became recognised by critics as something unique in its own right.

Though the second series met with a relatively lukewarm reception, Primeval's third series received high praise from critics as its strongest outing yet. Despite maintaining good ratings, Primeval was cancelled by ITV following the third series due to financial issues. After a few months in hiatus, the programme was brought back through a co-production deal with UKTV, allowing for the production of a fourth and fifth series. Reception to the fourth series was mixed, but the fifth series again garnered praise from critics. Though the fifth series was a success during its initial broadcast on the channel Watch in 2011, its disappointing ratings when it was broadcast on ITV the following year led to Primeval being cancelled again.

The success of Primeval spawned an accompanying franchise of merchandise, including novels, games and toy lines. An American film adaptation was announced to be in production in 2009 but languished in development and was ultimately never made. A Canadian spinoff series, Primeval: New World, aired in 2013 but was cancelled after a single 13-episode season.

== Production ==
=== Conception ===
Tim Haines, who studied zoology and had a background in science journalism, made his first television breakthrough in the late 1990s when, as a television producer at the BBC, he envisioned and created the nature documentary series Walking with Dinosaurs (1999). Walking with Dinosaurs was the first ever natural history series on dinosaurs to make use of extensive special effects to depict them as animals in their natural environments and was a massive success, becoming the most watched science programme in British television history. While working on Walking with Dinosaurs, Haines came up with the idea of using the technology of the series to produce a science fiction drama. Although the BBC were receptive to the idea, they wanted a recognisable property rather than a new idea, leading Haines to produce The Lost World (2001), an adaptation of the Arthur Conan Doyle novel of the same name. According to Haines, the success of The Lost World showed that it was possible to take the technology of Walking with Dinosaurs and create "very entertaining Hollywood-esque stories".

The successes of his programmes allowed Haines to co-found his own high-end television production company in 2002, Impossible Pictures. After the production of The Lost World, Haines came up with the idea of Primeval, though he at this point called it Cutter's Bestiary. Among the inspirations for the idea were the old science fiction films of Ray Harryhausen, which Haines felt had a "certain charm". Another inspiration were fossil ghost lineages, which Haines imagined could be explained by animals "swapping times". Other influences included Jurassic Park and King Kong. Commentators unassociated with the production team have also suggested that Primeval was partly inspired by series such as Doctor Who, Lost, Stargate and Quatermass.

Haines wrote a script together with another writer though it ultimately led to nothing. Adrian Hodges, a television writer who at this point had recently won a BAFTA for Charles II: The Power and the Passion (2003), met with Laura Mackie, the BBC Head of Drama to discuss possibilities of future work. Hodges turned down working on Bleak House (2005) due to wanting to do "something that's fun" in the vein of Buffy the Vampire Slayer. Mackie then suggested Cutter's Bestiary; although Hodges thought the title was "terrible" he thought the concept of dinosaurs in the modern day was brilliant. Hodges came up with the title Primeval and he wrote several scripts for the BBC with the concept going through several different iterations, at first envisioned only as a 90-minute television film.

When Haines and Hodges began working on the concept they had strived to create something that was also akin to Doctor Who, which at the time had not yet been revived. Once Doctor Who was revived by Russell T Davies in 2005, Primeval was deemed to be too similar by the BBC and was turned down, four or five years after Haines had first pitched Cutter's Bestiary. After being turned down by the BBC, Haines and Hodges pitched Primeval to ITV commissioner Nick Elliott. Elliott greenlit the series on account of liking the scripts produced by Hodges and out of a wish to replicate the success of the revived Doctor Who. Additional funding for Primeval was also secured from the German ProSieben and the French M6.

=== Development history ===
With the production of the series secured and several scripts already written, the producers in January 2006 moved on to casting the lead actors. Hodges and Haines personally approached Douglas Henshall, who played lead character Nick Cutter, for the role but the other actors were cast through regular auditions. Henshall was joined in the main cast by James Murray, Andrew-Lee Potts, Hannah Spearritt, Lucy Brown, Juliet Aubrey, Ben Miller and Mark Wakeling. (Note: For more extensive information on the casting process of Primeval, see the articles on the individual series: series 1, series 2, series 3, series 4 and series 5.)

Primeval was envisioned as a family series that did not take itself too seriously and appealed to both adults and kids. The producers sought to ensure that it would not just be a children's programme by also making the drama work on its own, working towards a "PG-13 feel". The production team also made the deliberate choice to set many of the episodes in familiar environments for the audience and give the series a "modern feel" with the intent that viewers would feel as if they could find "dinosaurs in their kitchen". In addition to following a "monster-of-the-week" format, Primeval also sought to touch on deeper themes such as environmental preservation and ecological disaster.

When choosing directors for Primeval, Haines and Hodges wished to hire people with good track records. The directors approached for the first series were Cilla Ware and Jamie Payne. Neither director had much background with action scenes but both were experienced with directing drama. The visual style of the series got some inspiration from Errol Flynn films such as Captain Blood (1935) and The Adventures of Robin Hood (1938). During production of the first series, the title was initially spelt Primaeval. The production of the first series was announced by ITV on 27 December 2005, touted as a "six-part epic about scientists who travel into prehistoric times through black holes".

Following the success of the first series, Primeval was recommissioned for a second series in March 2007, announced on 8 June. The entire first series main cast returned for the second series, with the exception of Wakeling. The second series also introduced the further main cast members Karl Theobald and Naomi Bentley. The third series of Primeval was announced on 30 January 2008. Henshall had felt during the second series that Primeval had become "simplified in its ambitions" and left the series during the third series, which necessitated extensive rewrites to the intended plot of the third series, also impacting the storylines of Jenny Lewis (Lucy Brown) and Helen Cutter (Juliet Aubrey); Henshall was replaced as the main lead of the series by Jason Flemyng as Danny Quinn. Further new characters were introduced in the third series, played by Laila Rouass, Ben Mansfield and Belinda Stewart-Wilson.

==== Cancellation and a revival ====
Despite the third series' being successful, Primeval was cancelled after its run on 15 June 2009 for financial reasons; ITV almost filed for bankruptcy during the Great Recession. ITV declined to recommission Primeval for a fourth series despite Impossible Pictures', the production company behind the series, proposing numerous different options, such as producing the series cheaper (for £600,000 per episode) or offering first-run rights to a rival channel. The cancellation was likely primarily motivated by the effects budget; Primeval cost several million pounds per series and ITV could not claim all of the money earned by the series because it was produced independently by Impossible Pictures. During the production of the third series, the producers had at no point expected that Primeval would not return for a fourth series, stating in subsequent interviews that they would not have left as many of character's fates up in the air had they known of the threat of cancellation.

Primeval was recommissioned three months after being cancelled. The "resurrection" of the series was made possible through a new deal made by Impossible Pictures, in which the series would be co-produced by both ITV and UKTV (with the costs shared), with additional funding also being provided by BBC Worldwide and ProSieben. The deal secured the making of 13 new episodes, split into a fourth and fifth series. The fourth series would air on ITV and then on the UKTV-owned channel Watch whereas the fifth series would air first on Watch. The production team were thrilled to be able to produce two additional series, as it would allow them to resolve the plotlines of the previous series and move Primeval further. The fourth and fifth series had a combined budget of £15 million.

Although most of the cast of the third season were announced as returning for the fourth and fifth series, the production needed to cast several new characters, because of the departures of several actors and the third series' leaving several characters stranded in the past. New main cast members Laila Rouass and Jason Flemyng were also unable to commit to an entire further series. As a result, the fourth and fifth series brought in several new main characters, played by Ciarán McMenamin, Ruth Kearney, Ruth Bradley and Alexander Siddig. Ultimately, poor ratings for the fifth series when it aired on ITV in 2012 caused Primeval not to be renewed for a sixth series, despite the production team's and the cast's interest in continuing the series.

==== Production schedule ====
Series	Announced	Filming	Filming time	First aired	Last aired	Ref(s)
Series 1	27 December 2005	March–August 2006	c. 4.5 months	10 February 2007	17 March 2007	
Series 2	8 June 2007	June–September 2007	c. 3 months	12 January 2008	23 February 2008	
Series 3	30 January 2008	Middle–late 2008	c. 6 months	28 March 2009	6 June 2009	
Series 4	29 September 2009	22 March–26 June 2010	3 months	1 January 2011	5 February 2011	
Series 5	29 September 2009	July–November 2010	c. 4 months	24 May 2011	28 June 2011	

=== Special effects ===
An anomaly, as seen in the first episode of Primeval

The visual effects of the first three series of Primeval were created by the London-based visual effects company Framestore, who were brought in due to being long-time collaborators with Haines and Impossible Pictures, previously having worked on Walking with Dinosaurs and the other Walking with... series. Christian Manz was hired as a visual effects supervisor due to the highly ambitious effects required for Primeval. Each episode required about thirteen weeks of effects work, with eight weeks of animation, six weeks of compositing and three weeks of lighting. Compositing was the most expensive portion, taking up about half of the budget. Usually multiple episodes were worked on at the same time. Framestore employed a crew of 60 people for Primeval, including fifteen animators and fifteen compositors, about the same number of people as the crew that shot the series. The large crew was necessary in order to be able to produce the effects on time since production of Primeval was often very fast; the effects work on the first series began during filming in April 2006 and was finished in September.

The producers did not initially have a clear idea for how the anomalies were supposed to look; in his scripts, Hodges simply described them as "shimmering in the air". The design was created by Haines and the effects team, with the goal to make it quite beautiful. The crushed glass-like final design drew on the idea that they were a fragmented version of what was on the other side―in scenes where people are depicted as going through them, the fragments gradually get bigger until they finally step into the world on the other side.

Framestore were initially announced as also working on the fourth series, but ended up not partaking in its production. In their place, the visual effects of the fourth and fifth series were created by the visual effects company The Mill. According to Haines, the production team opted to work with The Mill due to shooting in HD, an area in which The Mill had a "superb track record". The practical effects of Primeval, including puppets and animatronics, were created by Crawley Creatures, a company which had previously worked with Impossible Pictures on both the Walking with... programmes and on Prehistoric Park.

=== Music ===
Dominik Scherrer was the lead composer for the first three series of Primeval. Scherrer spent ten days composing tracks and an additional three days to record and mix them for each episode. He opted to create music that was a hybrid between electronic and traditional orchestra, noting that the urban nature of the setting and the attitudes of the characters were an influence. Scherrer said that the CGI nature of the show was a creative challenge, as the themes he scored for the creatures were often based on incomplete images. He noted "sometimes a drawing of the creature, or just a description from the director may help me get a feel for the creature. The final look and texture can be very influential on the music". On creating the theme song of Primeval, Scherrer stated that "the central feel is that of majesty and adventure, reflecting the momentous occasion of mankind linking up with the pre-historic past and also the majesty of the creatures themselves – they are dangerous and wonderful." 75 minutes of Scherrer's original score for the first three series was released by MovieScore Media both digitally and on CD on 20 September 2011 under the title Primeval: Original Television Soundtrack.

For the third series, composer James Hannigan also wrote new music to accompany Scherrer's themes. Angus Moncrieff worked as orchestrator, synth programmer and trumpet player for the first two series and also composed, produced and mixed 35–40 minutes of new music for four episodes of the third series. Stephen McKeon was the lead composer for the fourth and fifth series.

The initial broadcast of the first series featured the song "All Sparks" by Editors in each episode's end credits.

=== Creature designs ===
A Gorgonops, as seen in the sixth episode of Primeval. The prehistoric creatures of Primeval were based on their real counterparts, though there were also often intentional inaccuracies, such as the gorgonopsids having four rather than two saberteeth.

Though the prehistoric creatures featured in Primeval were fundamentally rooted in science they were intentionally not fully scientifically accurate, often being exaggerated in size and made to look scarier. They were also often for cinematic purposes made more intelligent than their real-life counterparts to give them more character, such as predators deciding who and how to attack. The decision to not adhere to strict scientific rigour but to rather use science as an "inspiration for creative thought" was made by Haines, who after working on the Walking with... programmes (which had to adhere more strongly to scientific fact) wanted to be free of such restrictions. Fictional design details included decisions such as giving Gorgonops four rather than two saberteeth. In addition to featuring real prehistoric creatures, Primeval also introduced several fictional creatures, some from the future. The decision to include future animals was made during pre-production of the first series, with the idea being that if anomalies connected the past to the present they could logically also connect the present to the future. The most iconic of Primeval's future creatures are the recurring future predators, giant flightless predatory bats.

Though fictionalised, prehistoric creatures in most cases still greatly resembled their real counterparts, not only a design decision but also a decision made to make it easier for animators; real creatures were always easier to animate since their biomechanics could often be figured out and animated convincingly more easily than fictional designs. Scientific theories on the animals featured were also often used for deciding the behaviour and abilities of creatures. As an example, certain genera of therocephalians might have been venomous, a theory which was used as the basis for also making the therocephalians featured in Primeval venomous.

The process of creating the creature models involved first creating concept artwork; many of the creatures were designed by Daren Horley. Horley was involved with the project very early on, before it was commissioned by ITV, and had produced some concept sketches for Haines's initial pitch of Cutter's Bestiary to the BBC. Horley also designed the texture maps for the finished models. Though his designs continued to be used, Horley ceased to work on Primeval after the third series.

After Horley had created concept artwork, sculptors made maquettes out of clay based on his designs. These were then scanned into the computer using a very high resolution laser scanner.

== Main cast and characters ==
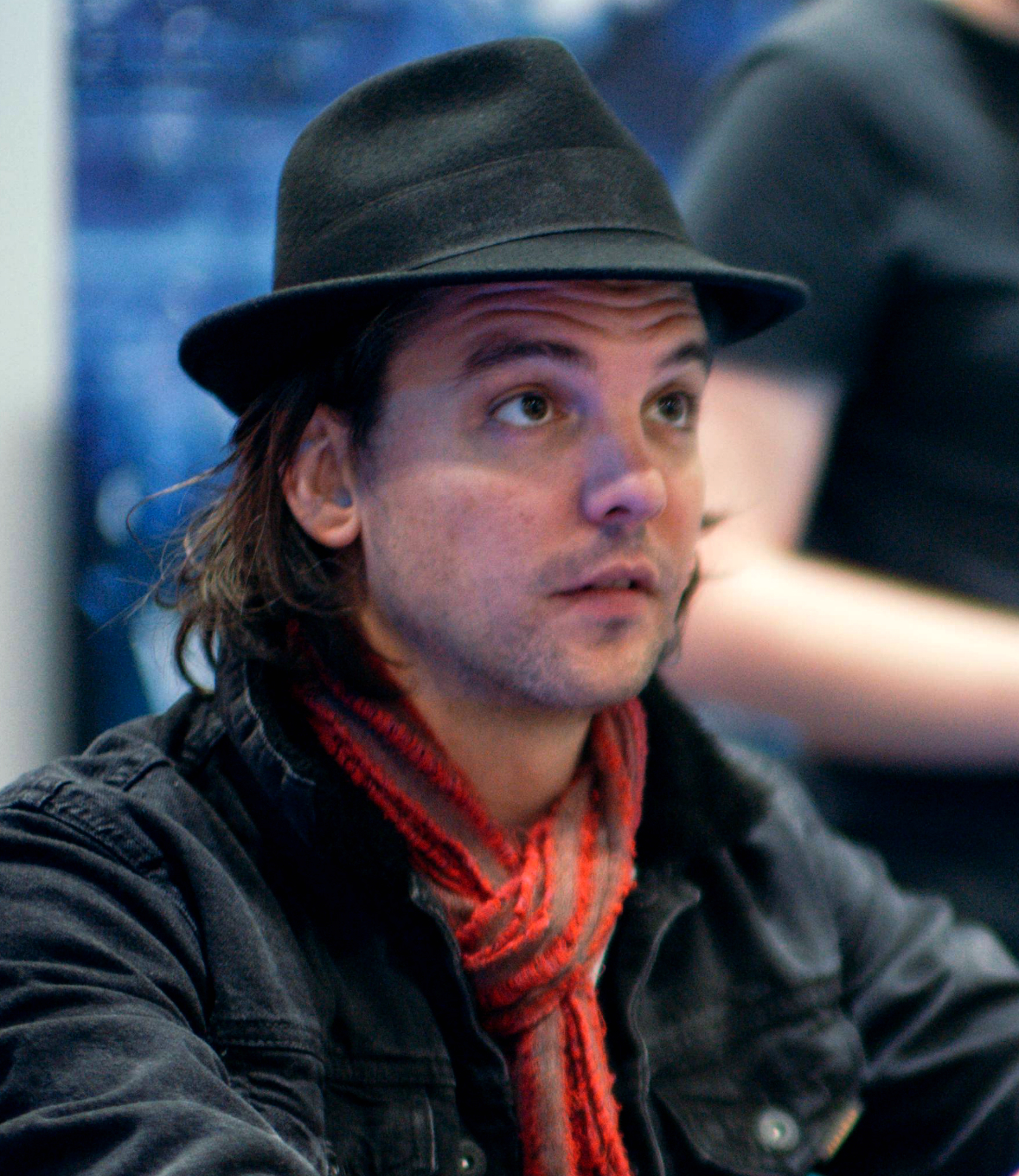
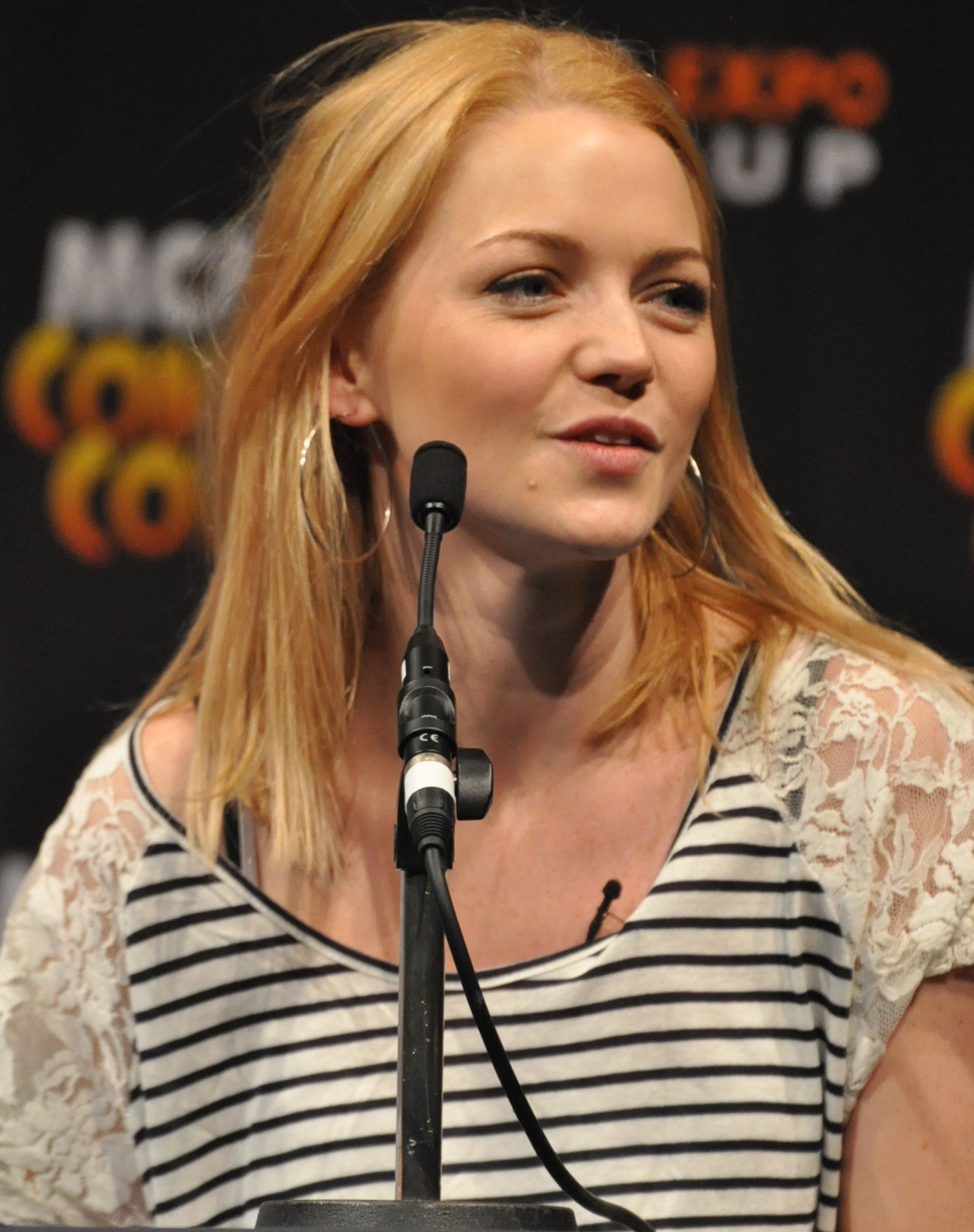
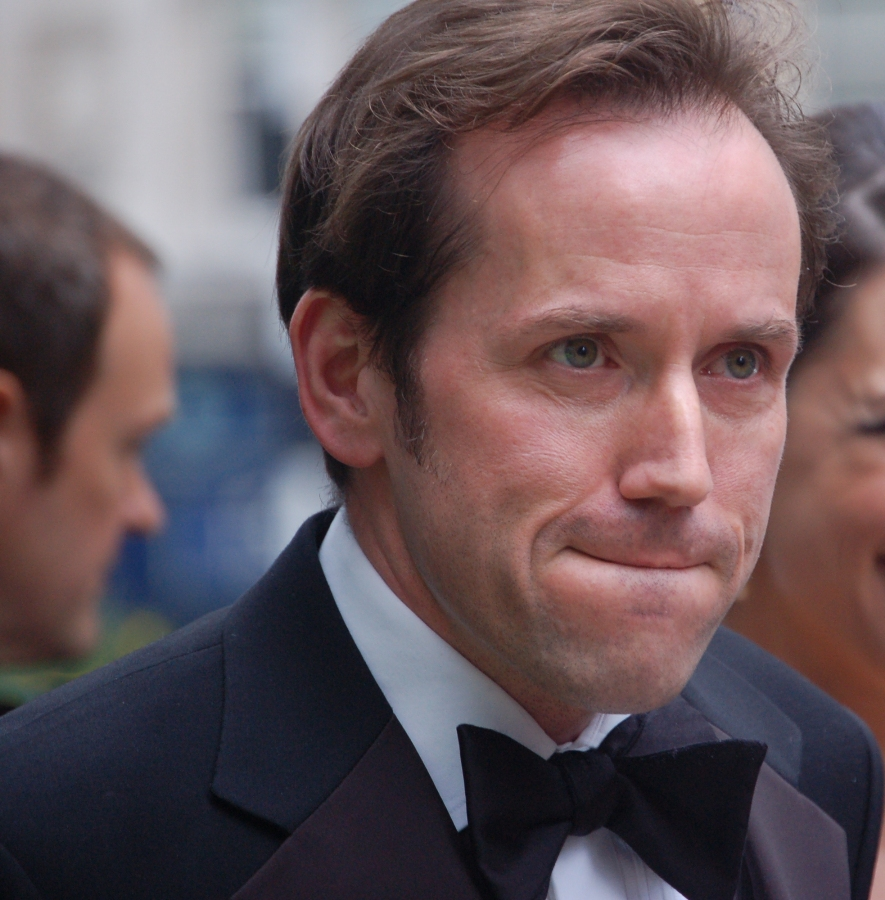
Andrew-Lee Potts (left), Hannah Spearritt (centre) and Ben Miller (right) were the only main cast members to star in all five series of Primeval
- Douglas Henshall as Nick Cutter (series 1–3)
- James Murray as Stephen Hart (series 1–2)
- Andrew-Lee Potts as Connor Temple
- Lucy Brown as Claudia Brown (series 1) and Jenny Lewis (series 2–3, guest series 4)
- Hannah Spearritt as Abby Maitland
- Juliet Aubrey as Helen Cutter (series 1–3)
- Ben Miller as James Lester
- Mark Wakeling as Captain Tom Ryan (series 1)
- Karl Theobald as Oliver Leek (series 2)
- Naomi Bentley as Caroline Steel (series 2)
- Jason Flemyng as Danny Quinn (series 3, guest series 4)
- Laila Rouass as Sarah Page (series 3)
- Ben Mansfield as Captain Hilary Becker (series 3–5)
- Belinda Stewart-Wilson as Christine Johnson (series 3)
- Ciarán McMenamin as Matt Anderson (series 4–5)
- Alexander Siddig as Philip Burton (series 4–5)
- Ruth Kearney as Jess Parker (series 4–5)
- Ruth Bradley as Emily Merchant (series 4–5)
- Anton Lesser as Gideon Anderson (series 4)
- Jonathan Byrne as Ethan Dobrowski/Patrick Quinn (series 4)
- Janice Byrne as April Leonard (series 5)

== Episodes ==
Series	Episodes	Originally released			Average UK viewers (millions)
Series	Episodes	First released	Last released	Network	Average UK viewers (millions)
1	6	10 February 2007	17 March 2007	ITV	6.39
2	7	12 January 2008	23 February 2008	ITV	6.29
3	10	28 March 2009	6 June 2009	ITV	4.99
4	7	1 January 2011	5 February 2011	ITV	4.03
5	6	24 May 2011	28 June 2011	Watch	0.67

=== Series 1 (2007) ===
The first series follows the efforts of Professor Nick Cutter (Douglas Henshall) and his associates, friend and colleague Stephen Hart (James Murray), student Connor Temple (Andrew-Lee Potts) and a zookeeper Abby Maitland (Hannah Spearritt) as they investigate the appearance of anomalies that allow the passage to other times and places, allowing often-dangerous creatures from the distant past or future to threaten the lives of citizens. The British government's Home Office, under the supervision of James Lester (Ben Miller) and Claudia Brown (Lucy Brown), becomes involved after a gorgonopsid travels through one such anomaly and wreaks havoc in the Forest of Dean. Professor Cutter's wife, Helen Cutter (Juliet Aubrey), presumed dead for eight years, is revealed to have been travelling in time through the anomalies.

=== Series 2 (2008) ===
After returning from the past at the end of the first series, Cutter discovers that Claudia Brown has been erased from time and that the team now operates out of a large structure called the Anomaly Research Centre (ARC). In Claudia's place an assertive and quite different PR agent named Jenny Lewis (also played by Lucy Brown) joined the team. Though Abby and Connor are drawn closer to each other, Abby is also forced to contend with Connor's new girlfriend Caroline Steel (Naomi Bentley), a woman with a hidden agenda. Claudia's former position has been taken by Oliver Leek (Karl Theobald), who secretly works with Helen and plans to use creatures from the anomalies, particularly future predators, to gain political power.

=== Series 3 (2009) ===
The third series sees Cutter continuing to investigate the anomalies, hoping to find ways to predict their appearance. Following the death of Stephen at the end of the second series, the team is expanded with Captain Becker (Ben Mansfield) and Sarah Page (Laila Rouass), a professor employed at the British Museum. James Lester has to deal with his old government rival Christine Johnson (Belinda Stewart-Wilson), who aspires to use the anomalies and future predators for military purposes. Helen invades the ARC with an army of clones and kills Cutter, whereafter he is replaced as team leader by Danny Quinn (Jason Flemyng), a former police detective who became involved after discovering his brother had been killed by a creature from the future.

=== Series 4 (2011) ===
The fourth series takes place around a year after the third, and features many new team members following the deaths and disappearances of large parts of the team in the third series. The updated ARC includes, alongside Captain Becker, new team members Matt Anderson (Ciarán McMenamin), a man with a hidden agenda with the ARC and the anomalies, Jess Parker (Ruth Kearney), a coordinator for the field team and Philip Burton (Alexander Siddig), an entrepreneur funding the ARC in a public/private partnership with the government. Connor and Abby also return to the team after having spent a year stranded in the Cretaceous. The fourth series also sees the appearance of a group of time travelers, including the mysterious Ethan Dobrowski (Jonathon Byrne), who is a serial killer, and Emily Merchant (Ruth Bradley), who is from the Victorian era.

=== Series 5 (2011) ===
The fifth series sees Connor recruited by Philip for his new secret project "New Dawn", which aims to extract energy from the anomalies and use it to solve the energy crisis. Matt, knowing New Dawn will lead to the end of the world, recruits Abby to attempt to learn what Connor and his new assistant April Leonard (Janice Byrne) are researching, all the while they are forced to deal with new anomalies and creature incursions.

== Reception and legacy ==
=== Critical reception ===
Primeval met with enthusiastic reactions during its original broadcast, becoming both a critical and an audience hit. The series was also successful with international audiences, airing in over 30 countries worldwide and for instance becoming very popular with audiences in both the United States and South Korea. Primeval has repeatedly been commended for not pretending to be something it is not and for its homages to classic science fiction. On the review aggregator website Metacritic (using a scale of 0–100), Primeval scored 72, indicating generally favourable reviews. Though some later commentators saw Primeval as never fully realising its potential, the series remains fondly remembered as one of the greatest British science fiction series. It has often been described as a cult series.

Though some reviewers found the characters of the first series to be insufficiently developed and some of the scripts to be "clichéd", Primeval succeeded in overcoming early dismissals of being a "Doctor Who ripoff", with critics agreeing that the series was something unique in its own right. The first series garnered praise for its overall story arc and not being repetitive. Opinions differed on the quality of the special effects. Rob Hunter of Film School Rejects gave the series high praise as the "best monster-of-the-week show since The X-Files". Reception for the second series was more lukewarm, with opinions differing on whether the effects were superior or inferior to those of the first series and on the quality of the writing and character development. Reception of the later episodes of the second series, in particular the two-part finale, was more universally positive.

The third series of Primeval met with high praise, with reviewers concluding that its greater number of episodes allowed for more extensive characterisation and character development, that it had a greater sense of thrill and suspense, that the actions of characters had consequences, and that its expanded central story was good. Several reviewers favourably compared the third series to the Jon Pertwee era of Doctor Who (1970–1974), owing to its altered team dynamic, and several considered it the strongest year of Primeval yet. In contrast, the fourth series received a more mixed response, with reviewers criticising the introduction of the new characters, the speed of the central story arc, and its resolution. The effects of the fourth series received praise as the best of Primeval so far. The fifth and final series was praised by critics as Primeval "going out on a high"; particular praise was given to the final two episodes.

=== Criticism ===
Torchwood creator and Doctor Who head writer Russell T Davies commented on the Primeval after the airing of its first series in 2007, stating that although he thought the series was "excellent", its "lack of ethnic casting" was "shameful". Davies's criticisms were met with some backlash as he had only recently cast Freema Agyeman as Martha Jones for Doctor Who's third series; Martha was the first non-white companion in Doctor Who history and commentators pointed out that similar criticisms could be raised at previous series of Doctor Who. In a review of the first episode of the fourth series of Primeval for WhatCulture, Dan Owen also pointed out Primeval's "curious lack of racial diversity in its all-white cast" and worried that the antagonist Philip Burton, played by Sudanese-born Alexander Siddig, would be painted as a stereotypical "Asian villain". Siddig's performance was however later praised by critics as "avoiding too many clichés". Naomi Bentley was cast for Primeval's second series, but she was revealed half-way through the series to be a secret antagonist. Primeval then rectified its lack of non-white main protagonists in the third series with the introduction of Sarah Page, played by Laila Rouass, though Rouass could not return for the fourth or fifth series on account of their lengthy periods of filming.

Primeval has also faced some criticism for its portrayal of female characters. In his review of the first series in Strange Horizons, Iain Clark criticised Primeval's female characters as "strong, but only to a point" and that "when it comes to the crunch it's always the men who do the saving; even the nerdy men". Clark conceded that Helen Cutter was a strong character "who remains consistently independent and interesting" but also noted that she was also portrayed as "unlikeable right through to the finale". The first series was also criticised for contriving the plot to have numerous scenes of Hannah Spearritt in her underwear. According to Spearritt, the scenes were filmed in one block and then spread out over the series; both she and the producers were reportedly shocked when watching it back and noticing how many such scenes there ended up being; no such scenes were filmed for subsequent series. Both Spearritt's Abby Maitland and the later introduced Emily Merchant, played by Ruth Bradley, were more positively received as strong female characters in later series.

=== Viewership ===
Primeval was nearly consistently met with good ratings. The first and most watched episode of the series was watched by over seven million viewers, over a million more than the usual viewing figures of its slot on ITV. Although Primeval was commissioned by ITV due to the success of Doctor Who and several commentators saw it as ITV's attempt at creating a rival series, the cast and crew of Primeval did not envision the series as a Doctor Who-competitor. Douglas Henshall stated in a 2007 interview that Primeval had a completely different format and instead compared it to The A-Team, with influences from Jurassic Park and Indiana Jones. In a 2021 interview, Henshall stated that it would have been impossible to seriously compete with Doctor Who, a sentiment echoed by Adrian Hodges, who stated that although it would have been great if they had been able to beat Doctor Who, he "just wanted to do well". Though both Henshall and Hodges believed that Primeval would have done better if it had aired a few years later, Andrew-Lee Potts believed Primeval to have aired at just the right time based on its success. Primeval was for its first two series not far behind the viewership figures of contemporary Doctor Who, with the first series having an average of 6.39 million viewers (compared to Doctor Who's 7.55 million) and the second having 6.29 million (compared to Doctor Who's 8.05 million).

The third series averaged about five million viewers per episode; although this was down more than a million from the previous two series, the numbers were still considered successful both by commentators and by ITV itself. The series created after Primeval's cancellation and revival saw more seriously dropping viewing statistics. The fourth series averaged around four million viewers, which was considered somewhat disappointing. The fifth series first premiered on the digital channel Watch, where it averaged around 500,000 viewers. Although much less than on the terrestrial channel ITV, the numbers were a great success in comparison with other digital channels and Primeval was Watch's biggest series of the year. When the fifth series was later broadcast on ITV it had a considerably more disappointing run, with the first episode being watched by 2.55 million viewers and the last only by 1.38 million, the lowest ratings in Primeval's history.

Primeval : UK (ITV) viewers per episode (millions)

Series	Episode number										Average
Series	1	2	3	4	5	6	7	8	9	10	Average
1	7.09	6.29	6.17	5.81	6.46	6.52	–				6.39
2	6.32	6.05	6.27	6.39	6.33	6.44	6.20	–			6.29
3	5.89	4.94	3.28	4.97	5.20	5.27	5.34	5.13	4.97	4.95	4.99
4	4.45	3.29	4.17	4.15	4.21	3.83	4.09	–			4.03
5	2.55	1.77	1.85	1.59	1.79	1.38	–				1.82

Source: Broadcasters' Audience Research Board

=== Award nominations ===
Year	Award	Category	Result	Ref
2007	TV Quick Award	Best New Drama	Nominated	
2008	Satellite Award	Best Television Series, Drama	Nominated	
2008	VES Award	Outstanding Performance by an Animated Character in a Live Action Broadcast Program, Commercial, or Music Video	Nominated	
2009	BAFTA TV Award	Best Visual Effects	Nominated	
2010	Saturn Award	Best DVD Television Release	Nominated	

== Other media ==
=== Books ===
Primeval was accompanied by both novelisations of episodes of the series and by original novels with new stories. The original novels took the team from the series and placed them in new locations and situations and were in many cases stories the producers had wished to do for the TV series but which would not have been achievable with their budget. The book Extinction Event by Dan Abnett was in particular a storyline that they had wished to film but which would not be possible without a feature film-level budget. The storylines explored in the novels were created through a combination of the producers' telling writers stories they had wanted to do and the writers' pitching storylines themselves. Although the novels were written to not have any large-scale impacts on the plotlines of the TV series, the writers made an effort to keep them within the overall continuity.

=== Primeval: New World ===
A Canadian spinoff series of Primeval, Primeval: New World, was announced on 15 September 2011 as being in development for the Canadian television channel Space. Primeval: New World was a co-production between Omni Film productions, Impossible Pictures, and Bell Media. Production began in Vancouver, British Columbia, in the winter of 2011. Primeval: New World was not a direct continuation of the original series, though it continued its mythology and saw some cameo appearances, and was envisioned as an "older, darker and scarier" version of the program. Primeval: New World was cancelled after only a single thirteen-episode season due to poor ratings.

=== Film adaptation ===
Plans for an American feature film adaptation of Primeval were announced on 15 May 2009, with Warner Bros. reported to have acquired the screen rights in a "six-figure deal". The film was announced as combining the "dinosaur element of Jurassic Park and the time travel element of Lost" and slated to be produced by Akiva Goldsman and Kerry Foster. The script was to be written by Jeff Pinkner; Haines and Hodges reserved the right to cancel the deal if they did not approve of the treatment. Unlike the TV series, the film was to be set in the United States and it would not be part of the same continuity, instead "start[ing] its own mythology" based on the themes and ideas of the series. All of the characters would be new but they would have similar roles and responsibilities to the characters of the series. Although Warner Bros. reportedly planned production of the film to begin in 2010 its script was still being revised in 2011. A finished script never materialised and a film adaptation remains as of yet unproduced.

=== Other merchandise ===
The first and second series of Primeval were accompanied by a line of action figures, created by Character Group PLC and Design Works. The actors were all photographed from various angles to ensure that the figures were faithful depictions. The toy line included all main characters and some of the creatures.

Cubicle 7 released a role-playing game based on the first three Primeval series on 11 May 2011, with a 288-page rulebook written by Gareth Hanrahan. The expansion Companion, based on the fourth series, was released on 18 December 2013 with a 128-page book. Companion was followed by a second expansion, Evolution, based on the fifth series. Evolution was released on 2 July 2014, also with a 128-page book.

A line of greeting cards based on Primeval were released by Gemma International in January 2009.
