= Mark Wakeling =

British actor

Mark Wakeling (born 11 October 1971) is a British actor and founder of The Actors Temple in London.

== Biography ==
After serving as an officer in the Coldstream Guards, Wakeling trained as an actor at The Poor School in London, graduating in 1998. In 2003, he founded The Actors' Temple with Ellie Zeegen and teaches Meisner there. He has worked with Ken Loach on The Wind That Shakes The Barley and played the part of Captain Tom Ryan in Series 1 of ITV’s Primeval which premiered in 2007.

Following the pandemic in 2021, Wakeling founded the Amberwood Animal Sanctuary in Oxfordshire

== Filmography ==
Year	Film	Role	Notes
2000	Shiner	TV Cameraman	
2002	Woman X		(Short)
2002	Prick	Rob	(Short)
2003	Two Minutes After Midnight	the angel	(Short)
2005	The STDers	Richard Creek	
2006	Cut Sleeve Boys	Antoine	
2006	The Wind That Shakes the Barley	Captain Harris	
2006	La Petite Mort	Lead	(Short)
2007	Scarred	Footballer	(Short)
2008	Quantum of Solace	MI6 agent	
2014	404	Boss	(Short)
2015	Luck	Luke	
2017	Bikini Blue	Cutie	
Year	Television series	Role	Other notes
1999	Wonderful You	Gordon	TV mini-series, 1 episode
2000	In Defence	PC Crispin Mills	TV series, 1 episode
2001	Never Say Never Mind: The Swedish Bikini Team	Richard	(Video)
2001	Sword of Honour	Halberdier sergeant	(TV movie)
2001	Band of Brothers: Day of Days	Pilot - Plane 66	TV mini-series, 1 episode
2002	Doctors: Borrowed Time	Nathan	TV series, 1 episode
2004	Footballer's Wives: Series 3 - Episode 3	Doctor Wilson	TV series, 1 episode
2001	Love Soup: Series 1 - Episodes 1 and 2	Greg	TV series, 1 episode
2001	Peep Show: Series 3 - Episode 1	Stu	TV series, 1 episode
2007	Primeval: Series 1 - Episodes 1-6	Captain Tom Ryan	TV series, 6 episodes
2008	Doctors: Up Close and Personal	Hadley Stephens	TV series, 1 episode
2009	EastEnders: Airdate 28 July 2009	Luke	TV series, 1 episode
2010	Casting Nina	Kye Simpleton	(TV movie)
2015	Spooks: The Greater Good	Armed Policeman	TV series, 1 episode
2016	The Jason Philips Show	Richard	TV series short, 2 episodes
