= Jordan Mudge =

American football player (born 1989)

No. 75, 70
- Position: Offensive lineman

Personal information
- Born: September 8, 1989 (age 37)
- Listed height: 6 ft 4 in (1.93 m)
- Listed weight: 330 lb (150 kg)

Career information
- High school: Desert Hot Springs (Desert Hot Springs, California)
- College: Nevada
- NFL draft: 2012: undrafted

Career history
- BC Lions (2012)*; San Jose SaberCats (2013–2015); Portland Thunder (2015); Arizona Rattlers (2016); Buffalo Bills (2017)*; Washington Valor (2018); Albany Empire (2019)
- * Offseason or practice squad member only

Awards and highlights
- 2× ArenaBowl champion (2018, 2019); 2× First-team All-Arena (2016, 2019); AFL Offensive Lineman of the Year (2016)
- Stats at ArenaFan.com

Jordan Mudge (born September 8, 1989) is an American former professional football offensive lineman who played in the Arena Football League (AFL) for the San Jose SaberCats, Portland Thunder, Arizona Rattlers, Washington Valor, and Albany Empire. He played college football at the College of the Desert, Bakersfield College, and the University of Nevada, Reno.

== Early life and college ==
Jordan Mudge was born on September 8, 1989. He attended Desert Hot Springs High School in Desert Hot Springs, California.

Mudge played his freshman season of college football for the Desert Roadrunners of the College of the Desert. He spent his sophomore year with the Bakersfield Renegades of Bakersfield College. He was then a part-time starter for the Nevada Wolfpack of the University of Nevada, Reno from 2010 to 2011. Mudge graduated from Nevada with a degree in general studies.

== Professional career ==
After going undrafted in the 2012 NFL draft, Mudge signed with the BC Lions of the Canadian Football League on May 29, 2012. He was released by the Lions on June 22, 2012.

Mudge was assigned to the San Jose SaberCats of the Arena Football League (AFL) on February 20, 2013. He was placed on inactive reserve on April 3 and activated on April 17, 2013. He recorded one assisted tackle and one rushing attempt for five yards during the 2013 season. Mudge was placed on injured reserve on April 1, 2014. Mudge re-signed with the SaberCats on March 7, 2015.

On March 19, 2015, Mudge and claim order position were traded to the Portland Thunder for Donte Paige-Moss. Mudge was placed on recallable reassignment on May 25 but activated the next day. He was placed on inactive reserve on June 27 and later injured reserve July 8, 2015. Overall, Mudge played in nine games for the Thunder during the 2015 season.

On March 10, 2016, the newly renamed Portland Steel traded Mudge to the Arizona Rattlers for Colt Lyerla. Mudge was placed on refused to report on March 11 but activated on March 14, 2016. He earned first-team All-Arena honors at center in 2016 while also being named the AFL Offensive Lineman of the Year.

Mudge was signed by the Buffalo Bills of the National Football League on April 8, 2017. The 2017 Bills media guide stated that Mudge's hidden talent was making balloon animals. Mudge was released during final roster cuts on September 1 but was signed to the team's practice squad the next day. He was released from the practice squad on October 16, 2017.

Mudge was assigned to the Washington Valor of the AFL on March 28, 2018. He was placed on refused to report on March 29 and later activated on April 24. He was placed on league suspension on June 9, activated on June 14, placed on recallable reassignment on June 27, and activated on June 28, 2018. The Valor finished the season 2–10 but all AFL teams made the playoffs that year. On July 28, 2018, the Valor beat the Baltimore Brigade in ArenaBowl XXXI by a score of 69–55.

Mudge was assigned to the AFL's Albany Empire on March 26, 2019. He posted one solo tackle during the 2019 season. The Empire went 10–2 in 2019 and won ArenaBowl XXXII against the Philadelphia Soul by a score of 45–27. The AFL folded after the season.

== Personal life ==
Mudge is a farmer. He started raising goats in 2016.
