= Power of Three =

Power of Three may refer to:

- Power of three, a number of the form 3^{n}
- Third power, a number of the form n^{3}

== Music ==
- Power of Three (Fatso Jetson album)
- Power of Three (Michel Petrucciani album)
- The Power of Three, a music album by Monte Pittman

== Television ==
- Bhoot Bandhus & The Power of Three, a 2023 Indian animated TV film based on the animated show Bhoot Bandhus
- Power of Three (Charmed), a term used in the Charmed television series

=== Episodes ===
- "The Power of Three", Teenage Mutant Ninja Turtles (original series) season 10, episode 3 (1996)
- "Power of Three" (Battle for Dream Island), a 2010 animated web series episode
- "The Power of Three" (Doctor Who), Doctor Who series 7, episode 4 (2012)
- "The Power of Three", Ancient Aliens season 6, episode 1 (2013)

== Other uses ==
- Jai Lava Kusa, a 2017 Indian film by K. S. Ravindra, also known as The Power of Three
- Power of Three (novel), a 1976 novel by Diana Wynne Jones
- Warriors: Power of Three, an arc in the fantasy novel series Warriors by Erin Hunter
