= Prototype (disambiguation) =

A prototype is something that is representative of a category of things, or an early engineering version of something to be tested.

Prototype may also refer to:

== Automobiles ==
- Citroën Prototype C, a range of vehicles created by Citroën from 1955 to 1956
- Citroën Prototype Y, a project of replacement of the Citroën Ami studied by Citroën in the early seventies
- Daytona Prototype, a sports car
- Le Mans Prototype, a class of sports car racing vehicles specifically designed for endurance racing
- Sports prototype, a broad category of racing cars designed for sports car racing

== Business ==
- Mack Prototype, a wholly owned subsidiary of Mack Group
- Prototype (company), a Japanese software company

== Science ==
- Prototype-matching, searching for a simplified pattern in objects searched
- Prototype theory, a model of graded categorization in cognitive science
- Prototype drug, a represent of a class of drugs with similar chemical structure and action mechanism

== Computer science ==
- In software engineering:
  - Software prototyping, the activity of creating prototypes of software applications
- In programming:
  - Function prototype, a declaration of a function that omits the function body but does specify the function's name, arity, and argument types
  - prototype, a property of all JavaScript objects, through which they can inherit further functionality
  - Prototype JavaScript Framework, a JavaScript library for the creation of Ajax applications
  - Prototype-based programming, a style of object-oriented programming in which classes are not present
  - Prototype pattern, a design pattern similar to the factory method pattern

== Literature ==
- Prototype (comics)
- Prototype, a 1996 novel by Brian Hodge
- Alien: Prototype, a 2019 Alien novel by Tim Waggoner

== Music ==
- Prototype (band), a US metal band
- Prototypes (band), a French rock band with hits in France and a US CD release
- The Prototypes, a British drum and bass duo
- Prototype (Bodies Without Organs album), 2005
- Prototype (Jeff Lorber album), 2017
- Prototype (Wallace Roney album), 2004
- Prototypes (album), by Alva Noto, 2000
- "Prototype" (song), by Outkast, 2003
- Prototype, a 1982 album by Experimental Products
- "Prototype", a 2014 song by Viktoria Modesta

== Film and television ==
=== Films ===
- Prototype (1983 film), a TV movie starring Christopher Plummer
- Prototype (1992 film), a 1992 science fiction film, also known as Prototype X29A

=== Television episodes ===
- "Prototype", Armored Trooper Votoms episode 6 (1983)
- "Prototype", City of Angels (2000) season 1, episode 1 (2000)
- "Prototype", George Lopez season 1, episode 1 (2002)
- "Prototype", Mann & Machine episode 1 (1992)
- "Prototype", Smallville season 6, episode 21 (2007)
- "Prototype", Star Trek: Voyager season 2, episode 13 (1996)
- "Prototype", Stargate SG-1 season 9, episode 9 (2005)
- "Prototype", Super Robot Monkey Team Hyperforce Go! season 3, episode 11 (2006)
- "Prototype", Superman: The Animated Series season 2, episode 21 (1997)
- "Prototype", The Big Show Show season 1, episode 1 (2020)
- "Prototype", Undeclared episode 1 (2001)
- "The Prototype", Dilbert season 1, episode 2 (1999)
- "The Prototype", Primeval series 5, episode 4 (2011)
- "The Prototype", Thunder Alley season 1, episode 1 (1994)
- "The Prototype", True Jackson, VP season 1, episode 6 (2009)
- "The Prototypes", Ancient Aliens season 11, episode 110 (2016)

== Video games ==
- Prototype (series), a video game series
  - Prototype (video game), the first game in the series
- The Prototype, the main antagonist in Poppy Playtime

== Other fields ==
- "The Prototype", a ring name of professional wrestler John Cena
- Prototype, in model building, any real object/system/device, used as a basis for a model, example in the hobby of model railroading
- Prototype filter, an electronic filter

== See also ==
- Archetype
- Proto (disambiguation)
