= Desert Hot Springs (thermal mineral springs) =

Thermal springs in Riverside County, California

- Miracle Hill
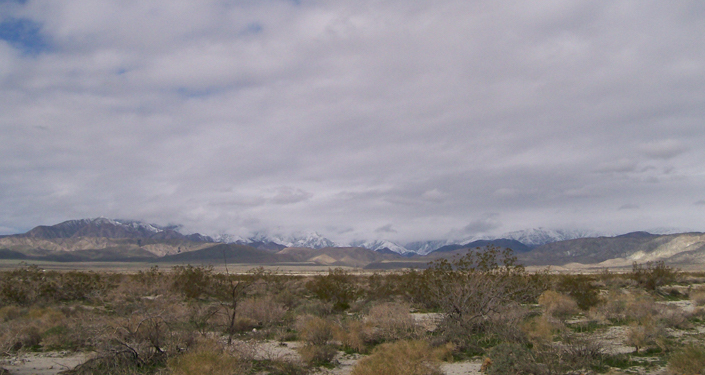
- Interactive map of Desert Hot Springs
- Location: Riverside County, California
- Coordinates: 33°57′40″N 116°30′29″W
- Spring source: aquifer
- Elevation: 1,076 ft (328 m)
- Type: geothermal mineral springs
- Temperature: 120 °F (49 °C)

Desert Hot Springs is a geothermal geographic area in Riverside County, California with several hot springs. Since 1941, the California Department of Conservation has recorded approximately 200 geothermal wells (with temperatures below 212 °F) that have been drilled in this geographic area; approximately 50 of which are used for commercial spas and pools.

== History ==
The hot springs were used for hundreds of years by the Cahuilla Native American peoples long before the early settlers arrived. They referred to the area as Sec-he (boiling water). The springs were an integral aspect of both their creation myths as well as their culture, in the form of nukatem (sacred spirit creatures.) In the 1820s, the Mexican explorer, Don José Romero called the area Agua Caliente (hot water). In 1862, the Homestead Act was put into place by Abraham Lincoln, and shortly thereafter, non-Native explorers and settlers began to arrive. The City of Desert Hot Springs and the Desert Hot Springs Historical Society note that Jack Riley arrived in 1908, but did not settle there. These sources also state that the first white settler was a rugged woman pioneer, Hilda M. Gray, who developed a homestead south of Two Bunch Palms.

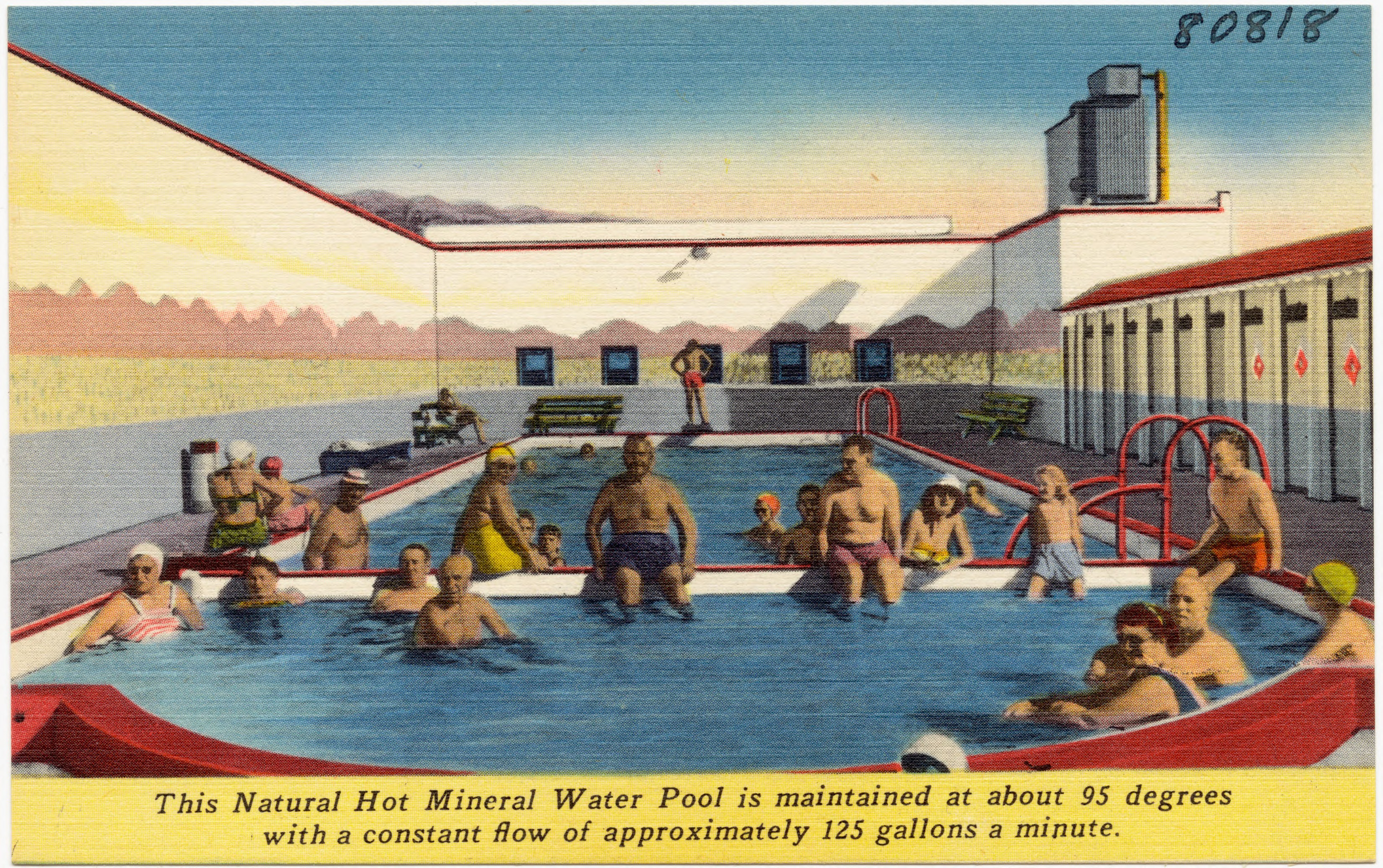
Natural Hot Mineral Water Pool at Desert Hot Springs, c.1930–1945

Later, in 1913, the homesteader, Cabot Abram Yerxa settled there, and he described the springs at Two Bunch Palms and at Seven Palms in his book, On the Desert Since 1913, and called the area Miracle Hill. In the 1930s, Yerxa and fellow homesteader Bob Carr began developing the area, and in 1941 opened a bathhouse. The area was later heavily developed with spa resorts and came to be known as the "Mineral Water Capital of the World".

== Water profile ==
The hot mineral water emerges from the ground at 120 °F to 160 °F. Both hot and cold springs in the area are tasteless and odorless. The mineral content of the waters are Aluminum Oxide, Barium, Bicarbonate, Calcium, Chloride, Copper, Fluoride, Iron Oxide, Manganese, Magnesium, Silica, Sodium, Sulfate. The ph (units): 8.3 and specific conductance (mmhos): 388. The water samples from the south side of the Mission Creek fault have high calcium and bicarbonate levels, where as those to the northeast side of the fault have elevated sodium and sulfate ions.

== Geology ==
Meteoric water from the San Bernardino Mountains flows along the Mission Creek fault where it is heated and eventually crests in alluvial deposits.

== See also ==
- List of hot springs in the United States
- List of hot springs in the world
