= Big Morongo Canyon Preserve =

Nature preserve in southern California, USA

Coordinates: 34°00′05″N 116°33′31″W

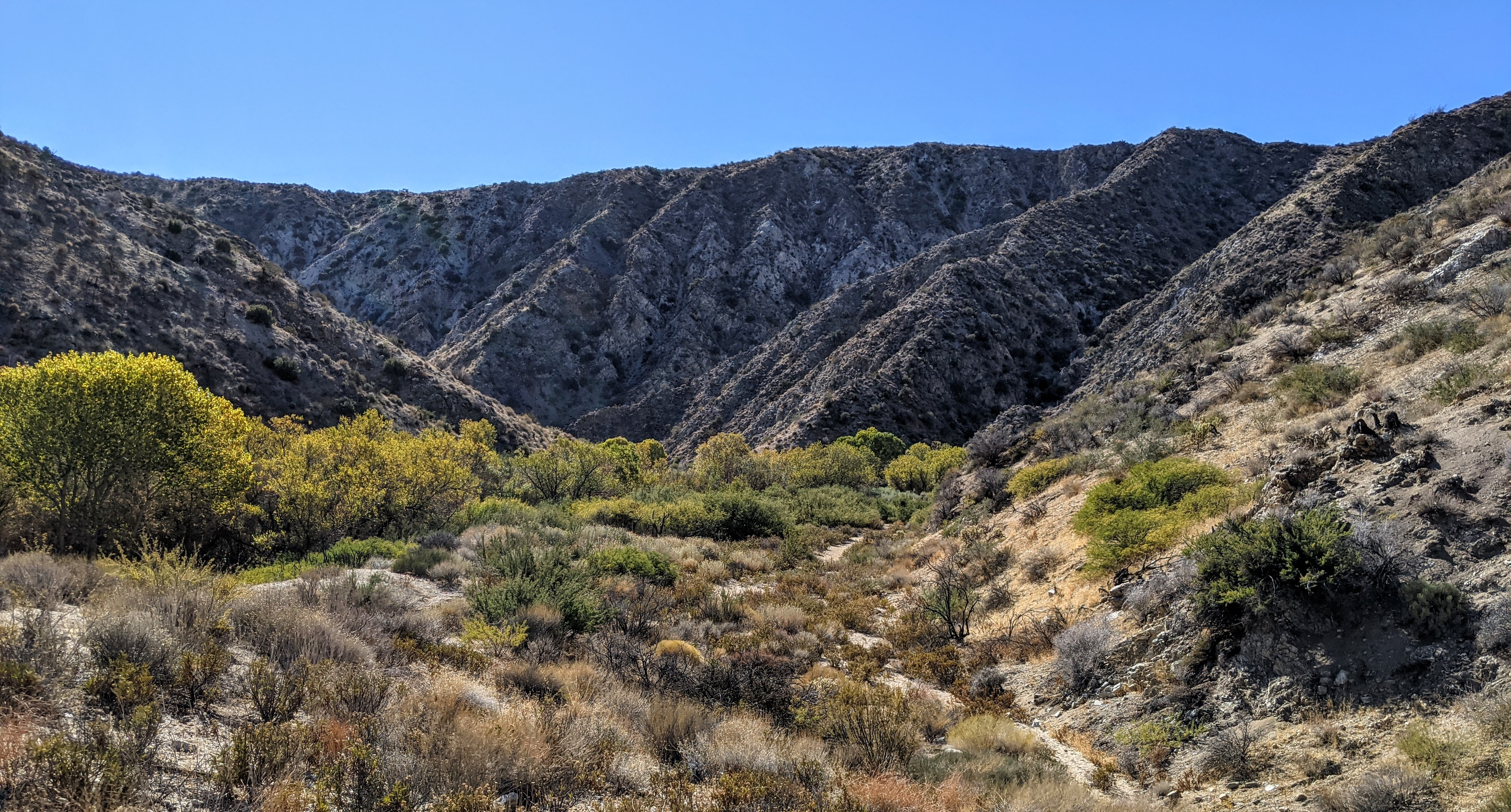
Big Morongo Canyon, view from the Canyon Trail of Big Morongo Canyon Preserve

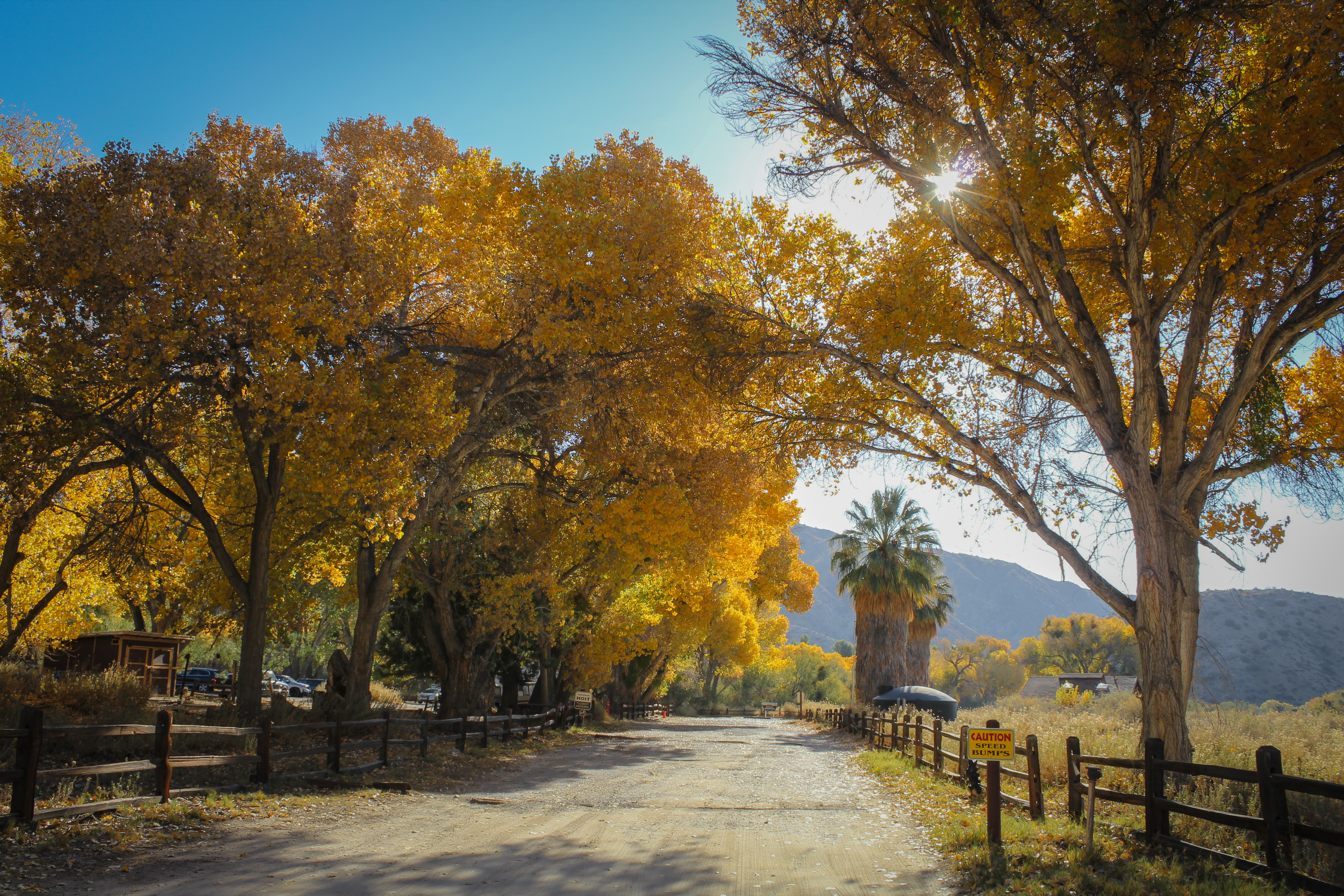
Tree-lined drive that leads into Big Morongo Canyon Preserve

The Big Morongo Canyon Preserve is a 31,000-acres (130 km^{2}) native plants habitat and wildlife preserve located in the Little San Bernardino Mountains of the Transverse Ranges, in the transition zone between the higher Mojave Desert and lower elevation Colorado Desert section of the Sonoran Desert. Due to its location within this transition zone, the area is especially high in natural diversity. The natural spring fed desert oasis found here is one of the 10 largest Cottonwood (Populus fremontii) and Willow (Salix lasiolepis) riparian habitats in California. It is also identified by the Audubon Society as one of the most important avian habitat areas in California.

The entrance to the preserve is located within Morongo Valley, California, an unincorporated place within San Bernardino County just off California State Route 62. Admission is free. The preserve is open from 7:30 am to sunset, each day.

== History ==
The last people to inhabit the canyon before the arrival of white settlers were the Morongos, a powerful clan of Serrano Indians. They lived peacefully in this canyon and surrounding valley until the mid-1800s.

The preserve was the site of a large (more than 10 acre) historic "Maringa" (Morongo) Native American Serrano permanent settlement. The site, CA SBR-561, is a large residential site with a continuous, dependable source of water. The valuable biotic resource assemblage that the water attracted, provided for ample food and manufacturing materials to support the view of it being a permanent Maringa Serrano residence for a long span of time. Present on the site are bedrock mortars, several types of ceramic wares, lithic tool stone debitage and numerous late period projectile points.

Human remains were discovered on the site in 1994 that were not cremated, suggesting a greater age of the site, since Serrano traditionally cremated their deceased in historic and ethnographic times. Little is known of the archaeological site, since no known ethnographic or historic accounts exist. The Serrano people who occupied this site had long before either left the area during the mission period, joining and merging with the populations of Cahuilla to the south and west on reservation lands, or had succumbed to European-introduced diseases long before. The Warren homestead, established in 1885 by Mark and Sylvia Warren, is located adjacent to the preserve.

The Nature Conservancy, San Bernardino County, and the United States Bureau of Land Management all contributed and managed the lands which were organized to create the preserve in 1982. In 1982, the Bureau of Land Management recognized the ecological features of the area and designated almost 3,700 acres of the ridge and canyon as an "Area of Critical Environmental Concern." More than 570 acres of the preserve was once planned as a possible site for an oil pipeline pumping station but was later donated by ARCO to the Nature Conservancy in 1989.

The preserve has undergone two significant fires since 1990. The most recent fire, the Paradise Fire in 2005, burned over 2,000 acres in the preserve and required extensive repair and replacement of the boardwalks, trails, and interpretive facilities. The BLM rebuilt all the damaged facilities to meet and exceed standards set by the Americans with Disabilities Act and other standards. Because of the extreme fire danger present, smoking is forbidden anywhere within the preserve.

Today, the preserve is managed by the County of San Bernardino with the assistance of the Friends of Big Morongo Canyon Preserve to protect rare and endangered wildlife, to promote the growth and restoration of a wide variety of plants, and to offer educational opportunities for students and nature lovers of all ages.

== Wildlife ==
The preserve aims to educate the public about its purpose in protecting vulnerable wildlife and ecosystems. Volunteers host educational opportunities including bird walks and group hikes. Public outreach programs and field trips are available.

Big Morongo Canyon Preserve is an internationally recognized birding site. Several rare or unusual species are known to nest here, and many other species are abundant during the spring and fall migration seasons. The preserve has been designated as an Important Bird Area by the American Bird Conservancy, the American Birding Association, and the Watchable Wildlife National Program, and is featured in the National Geographic Guide to Bird Watching Sites. Over 247 bird species have been recorded in the preserve, with at least 72 resident breeding species.

While the preserve is most well known amongst bird watchers, many animals also make their home within the preserve including the cougar, bobcat, coyote, gray fox, raccoon, mule deer, bighorn sheep, deer mouse, ground squirrel, cottontail rabbit, and various amphibians and reptiles, such as the Mohave rattlesnake and rosy boa.

== Geography ==
The preserve houses some of the oldest exposed rocks in California, dated at almost two billion years. They consist of granite that has been altered by centuries of heat and pressure to form gneiss and schist.

The preserve is characterized by steep canyons, rugged terrain, and desert oases. The upstream end of the canyon originates in the Mojave Desert, while its downstream portion opens into the Colorado Desert. The Morongo fault running through the canyon causes water draining from the surrounding mountains to form Big Morongo Creek and the marsh habitat.

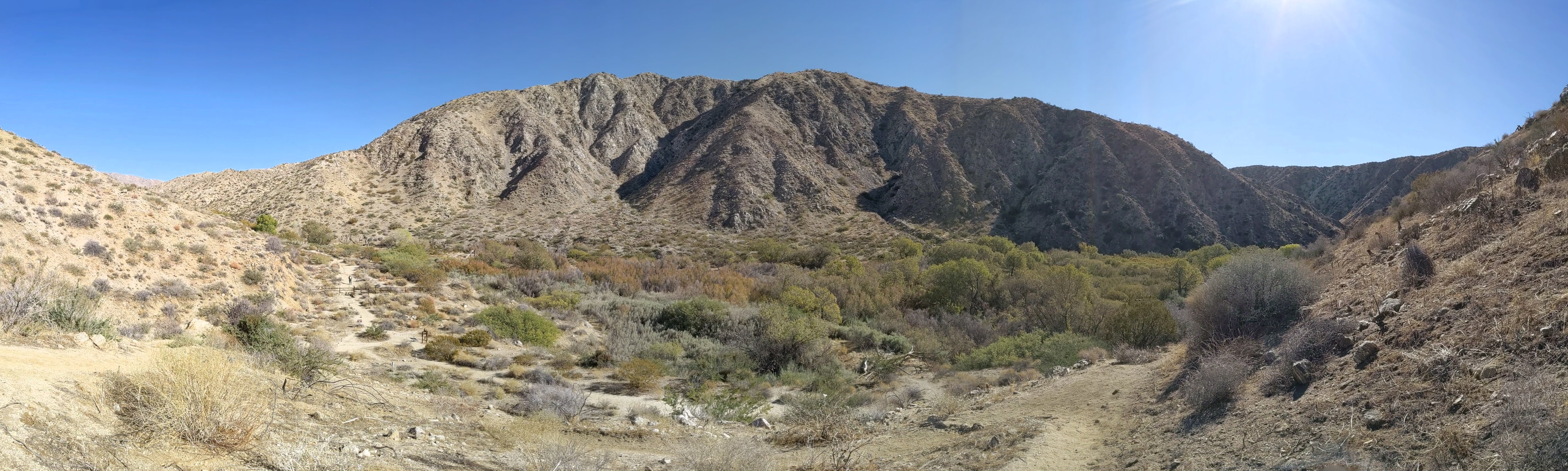
Panoramic view from the preserve's West Canyon Trail. The Big Morongo Creek flows from left to right (north to south) here, from the Mojave to the Colorado desert.

== Location ==
While the preserve's eastern boundary runs parallel to Joshua Tree National Park on the east, no public access exists between the two parks. Yucca Valley is 11 miles (18 km) east of the preserve via State Route 62, while Desert Hot Springs is 11 miles (18 km) to the southeast via State Route 62 and Pierson Boulevard. The nearest commercial airport is Palm Springs International Airport, which is 24 miles (39 km) south of the preserve.

== Climate ==
	High	Low	Record high	Record low	Rainfall	Record rain
Jan.	64	40	80 (1963)	11 (1949)	1.95"	11.2" (1943)
Feb.	66	40	88 (1996)	19 (1990)	1.07	8.4 (2005)
Mar.	68	41	95 (1988)	21 (1953)	1.05	3.5 (1958)
Apr.	74	44	100 (1989)	25 (1955)	0.49	3.8 (1958)
May	80	49	105 (1996)	31 (1958)	0.07	1.2 (1969)
June	90	54	113 (1972)	35 (1955)	0.01	0.3 (1968)
July	96	59	114 (1995)	42 (1956)	0.37	2.4 (1949)
Aug.	97	60	113 (1997)	38 (1954)	0.28	2.7 (1944)
Sept.	91	57	112 (1982)	37 (1953)	0.32	2.3 (1962)
Oct.	82	50	106 (1980)	21 (1971)	0.24	3.7 (2004)
Nov.	72	43	92 (1997)	20 (1958)	1.12	10.5 (1964)
Dec.	65	39	86 (1989)	15 (1968)	1.67	6.1 (2004)
Extremes			114 (1995)	11 (1949)	8.64"	Annual precip.

== Recreation ==
=== Camping ===
Camping is not permitted within the preserve. No fires of any kind are permitted.

=== Biking ===
Bicycles, skateboards, skates, or unauthorized vehicles of any kind are not permitted beyond the preserve's parking lot.

=== Hiking ===
Hiking is permitted only on designated trails. The preserve has several short trails, such as the Marsh and Mesquite trails which are under a mile long, while the Canyon trail is approximately 10 miles (16 km) round-trip.

=== Wheelchair access ===
Certain trails are built to meet and exceed Americans with Disabilities Act standards for wheelchair accessibility.

=== Pets ===
Due to the preserve's status as an Area of Critical Environmental Concern (ACEC), pets are not permitted within the preserve.

=== Hunting ===
Firearms and hunting are prohibited within the preserve.

=== Collecting ===
Collecting, or disturbance of wildlife is not allowed in the preserve.

=== Birding ===
Big Morongo Canyon Preserve is an internationally recognized birding site. Several rare or unusual species are known to nest here, and many other species are abundant during the spring and fall migration seasons. Over 247 bird species have been recorded in the preserve, with at least 72 resident breeding species.

=== Special rules ===
The discharge of firearms is prohibited within the main body of the Big Morongo Canyon Preserve; however, hunting is allowed further south in the undeveloped region of the ACEC. Off highway vehicles, dogs, fires, and horseback riders are not allowed in the main body of the preserve either; however, these uses are allowed in the undeveloped portion of the ACEC. Within wilderness areas, certain uses, such as motorized equipment and/or mechanized travel, are prohibited per Section 4 (c) of the Wilderness Act (1964). Hunters must comply with California DFG laws and regulations for all areas open to hunting.

=== Facilities ===
An information kiosk is located at the trail head just off the parking lot. There are onsite camp hosts. Trail maps, trail guides for self-guided walks, information brochures, picnic facilities, and restroom facilities are available at the preserve. Facilities also include a nature education center, and wheelchair-accessible trails.

=== Trails ===
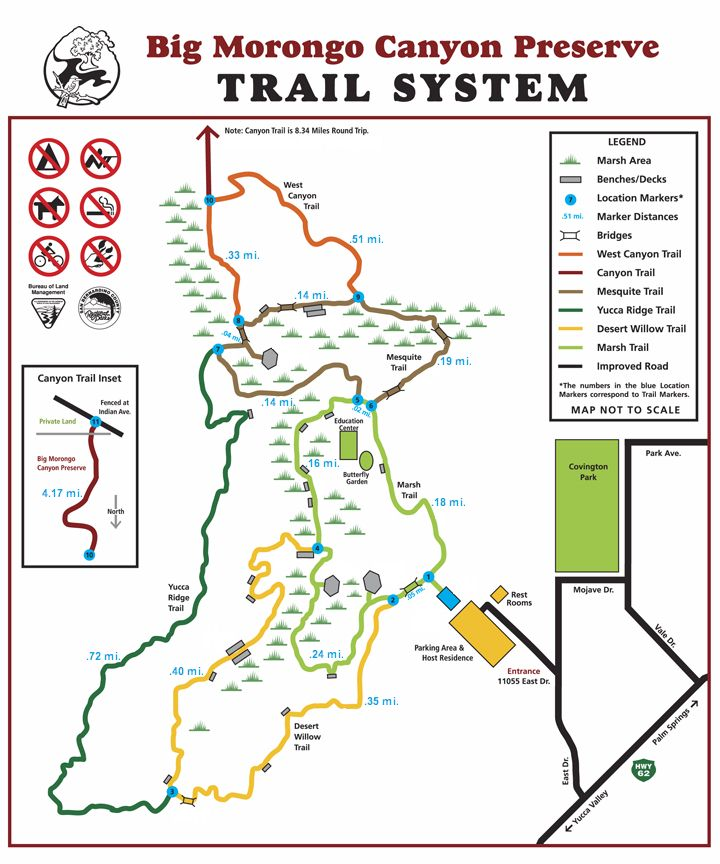
Big Morongo Canyon Preserve trail map

== See also ==
- Joshua Tree National Park topics
- Sand to Snow National Monument
- Flora of the California desert regions
- Natural history of the Colorado Desert
- Natural history of the Mojave Desert
