= Donte Paige-Moss =

American football player (born 1991)

No. 90, 13
- Position: Defensive end

Personal information
- Born: April 11, 1991 (age 35); Jacksonville, North Carolina, U.S.
- Listed height: 6 ft 4 in (1.93 m)
- Listed weight: 260 lb (118 kg)

Career information
- High school: Jacksonville (NC) Northside
- College: North Carolina
- NFL draft: 2012: undrafted

Career history
- Sacramento Mountain Lions (2012)*; Toronto Argonauts (2012); Portland Thunder (2014); San Jose SaberCats (2015); Orlando Predators (2016)
- * Offseason or practice squad member only

Awards and highlights
- Grey Cup champion (2012); ArenaBowl champion (2015)

Career CFL statistics
- Total tackles: 2
- Stats at CFL.ca (archived)

Career AFL statistics
- Total tackles: 50
- Sacks: 15.5
- Forced fumbles: 6
- Stats at ArenaFan.com

Donte Paige-Moss (born April 11, 1991) is an American former professional football defensive end. He played college football for the North Carolina Tar Heels.

== College career ==
He played at North Carolina. Entering the 2011 season, he was regarded as one of the top prospects for the 2012 NFL draft by analysts.

In December 2011, Moss left school early and declared for the draft. However, concerns about his character and work habits led to his non-selection in the draft. Other concerns surfaced after Paige-Moss posted a series of tweets during the 2011 Independence Bowl that media members judged "inappropriate."

== Professional career ==
Paige-Moss entered the 2012 NFL draft but was not selected. He was listed on the training camp roster for the Sacramento Mountain Lions of the United Football League. He was released by Sacramento before appearing in any games.

On October 5, 2012, Paige-Moss was signed to the practice roster of the Toronto Argonauts of the Canadian Football League (CFL). Paige-Moss finished the 2012 CFL season in which he only recorded 2 tackles. On December 19, 2012, Paige-Moss re-signed with the Toronto Argonauts. On June 7, 2013, he was released.

Paige-Moss was assigned to the Portland Thunder of the Arena Football League (AFL) on October 28, 2013.

On March 19, 2015, Paige-Moss was traded to the San Jose SaberCats for Jordan Mudge.

On December 23, 2015, Paige-Moss was assigned to the AFL's Orlando Predators.

== Personal life ==
While attending UNC-Chapel Hill, Moss was charged with simple assault after punching a teammate in the face twice.

Less than a month after going undrafted, he was arrested and charged with speeding, reckless driving to endanger and driving while impaired in Chapel Hill, North Carolina.
