= Palm Springs Unified School District =

Public school district in Riverside County, California

Address
- 150 District Center Drive Palm Springs, California, 92264; United States
- Coordinates: 33°49′30.2″N 116°29′40.9″W

District information
- Type: Public
- Grades: K–12
- Established: 1958
- Superintendent: Marcus Funchess
- Asst. superintendent(s): Simone Kovats
- NCES District ID: 0629550

Students and staff
- Students: 21,705 (2020–2021)
- Teachers: 961.16 (FTE)
- Staff: 1,125.81 (FTE)
- Student–teacher ratio: 22.58:1

Other information
- Website: www.psusd.us

The Palm Springs Unified School District, or PSUSD, is one of three public education governing bodies in the Coachella Valley desert region of Southern California. PSUSD governs the western half of the valley; the Coachella Valley Unified School District and Desert Sands Unified School District oversee communities in the eastern half. Administrative offices are located in Palm Springs. The PSUSD was established in 1958 from the Palm Springs Public Schools, later included Palm Springs High School in the 1960s.

== Summary ==
PSUSD employs more than 2000 administrators, certificated staff and classified staff. More than 23,000 students are enrolled in sixteen elementary schools, five middle schools, four high schools and a continuation high school. In addition, the district provides Preschools, Head Start programs, charter schools, and adult education.

The district covers the following communities:

- Cathedral City
- Desert Hot Springs
- Palm Desert (Parts of the city north of Frank Sinatra Dr.)
- Palm Springs
- Rancho Mirage
- Thousand Palms

Other unincorporated areas within the western Coachella Valley region are covered as well.

== Schools ==
=== Elementary ===
==== Cathedral City ====
- Agua Caliente Elementary School, opened in 1930's, current site since 1960, renovated.
- Cathedral City Elementary School (opened 1950s, moved to new site in 2005).
- Landau Elementary School – opened in 1991.
- Rio Vista Elementary School – opened in 2006.
- Sunny Sands Elementary School – opened in 1989.

==== Desert Hot Springs ====
- Bella Vista Elementary School – opened in 2014.
- Bubbling Wells Elementary School – opened in 1990.
- Cabot Yerxa Elementary School – opened in 2009.
- Julius Corsini Elementary School – opened in 1983 (formerly Hacienda Elementary School 1950s–80, replaced older site).
- Two Bunch Palms Elementary School – opened in 1997.

==== Palm Springs ====
- Cahuilla Elementary School – oldest grade school in existence, opened in 1920's, renovated.
- second Cahuilla in Finchy school campus (extended Advanced Studies).
- Cielo Vista Charter School – opened in 1980.
- Katherine Finchy School (formerly 'North End school") was renamed in 1951, after the long time educator. A new facility was built in 1998.
- Vista Del Monte Elementary School – opened in 1983, replaced older site since the 1920s.

==== Rancho Mirage ====
- Rancho Mirage Elementary School – city's oldest public school, opened in the 1940s, current site since 1967.

==== Thousand Palms ====
- Della S. Lindley Elementary School – opened in 1987.

=== Middle ===
==== Cathedral City ====
- James Workman Middle School – opened in 1995.
- Nellie Coffman Middle School – facility opened in 1976/77 – renovated, formerly in Palm Springs (1930s to 1976).

==== Desert Hot Springs ====
- Desert Springs Middle School – opened in 1989.
- Painted Hills Middle School – opened Fall 2011

==== Palm Springs ====
- Raymond Cree Middle School – opened in the 1960s, replaced site built in 1930s.
- Cielo Vista Charter School -

opened in the 1980s.

=== High ===
==== Cathedral City ====
- Cathedral City High School – opened in 1991/92, California Distinguished School.

Had the second highest test scores of all Coachella Valley high schools in the 2000s and 2010–11.

==== Desert Hot Springs ====
- Desert Hot Springs High School – opened in 1998, ten miles from Palm Springs.

==== Palm Springs ====
- Palm Springs High School – opened in 1938, oldest PSUSD school in existence.

Originally K–12 grade school in the 1920s and had the College of the Desert campus from 1958 to 1964.

==== Rancho Mirage ====
- Rancho Mirage High School in Rancho Mirage, opened in 2013.

=== Alternative Education ===
==== Cathedral City ====
- Mt. San Jacinto High School – facility opened in 1986 replaced El Camino Continuation High School in Palm Springs.

==== Desert Hot Springs ====
- Edward Wenzlaff Education Center (relocated from Desert Hot Springs Alternative Center 2015 and formerly Las Brisas Continuation) opened in 1992. (formerly Desert Hot Springs K-8 School 1940s–62, current site opened in 1963, renamed in 1996, was elementary school until 2014).

==== Palm Springs ====
- Palm Springs Adult School, adjacent to Katherine Finchy school
- Desert Learning Academy (K–8, plus high school, location formerly Ramon Alternative Center)
- Palm Springs Independent Studies (Elem/Jr High/Sr High) School
- Palm Springs Unified Mental Health Services (in former PSUSD Office)
- Coyote Run Preschool/ Canyon Run Kindergarten in Palm Springs' Gateway section.
- Proposed Desert Highland Education center

=== Proposed (in Palm Desert/ Thousand Palms area) ===
- Desert Cities – Palme Park School Complex (K–grade 8).

== Historic schools ==
The PSUSD used to have 5 other public schools in Palm Springs and one other in Cathedral City.

Until the 1950s, the PSUSD had separate school campuses for African-American, Latino, Asian-American and American Indian students when school segregation was then legal, then came the mandated policy of racial integration affected local schools. They were the El Camino, Harry Oliver, Mount San Jacinto and Palm Valley schools in the Section 14 neighborhood, inside the Agua Caliente Indian Reservation. 4 out of the 28 schools in the District reside on The Agua Caliente Indian Reservation: Cathedral City High School, Vista Del Monte Elementary School, James Workman Middle School and Rancho Mirage High School.

Local celebrities and billionaires like Walter Annenberg and Frank Sinatra boosted public schools in the city and desert, whom also personally fought against racial and ethnic segregation of public schools. At the time, even American Jewish and American Catholic students would choose church-run and religious day schools over public ones, until the end of WWII when their parents were comfortable sending them to secular public schools. By the start of the 1960s, the PSUSD was integrated of all races and creeds.

The (later private) Palm Valley School in the 1920s on the city limits of Cathedral City, closed and moved to current site in the 1960s.

The Smoke Tree school which faced the Walt Disney ranch and the Bob Hope and Elvis Presley residences closed in the 1960s.

The Frances Stevens school now the Palm Springs Theatre.

The Harry Oliver school became the Palm Springs Community School run by Riverside County Department of Education.

The Ramon School now the St. Theresa's Catholic school.

The relocated El Camino Continuation High School, on Demuth Park (the park and school's original site was on west Ramon and south Palm Canyon Dr.) in the late 1970s, on the PSHS site in the early 1980s, then became the Esperanza High School for teenage mothers in 1986, then closed in the early 1990s.

And the Mount San Jacinto School, later a special-day studies school on Section 14, the land parcel on the Agua Caliente Indian reservation, also where El Camino was.
