= Desert Hot Springs High School =

Public high school in California, United States

- Logo

Location
- 65850 Pierson Blvd; Desert Hot Springs, California, CA 92240; United States; 33°57′49″N 116°31′00″W

Information
- Type: Public
- Motto: Building tomorrow today, one student at a time, together.
- Established: 1999
- School district: Palm Springs Unified School District
- CEEB code: 50334
- Teaching staff: 87.41 (FTE)
- Grades: 9–12
- Enrollment: 1,718 (2023-2024)
- Student to teacher ratio: 19.65
- Colors: Blue and gold
- Mascot: Golden eagle
- Website: DHSHS Web Site

Desert Hot Springs High School, also abbreviated as DHSHS, is a public high school for grades 9–12. It is located in Desert Hot Springs, California. The school is one of four comprehensive high schools in the Palm Springs Unified School District.

== History ==
Desert Hot Springs High School opened on September 7, 1999, with an initial enrollment of 642. The school began with freshmen and sophomores and added a class each year with graduating its first class of 162 seniors in June 2002. Desert Hot Springs High School serves students from the communities of Desert Hot Springs, North Palm Springs, Sky Valley, and the unincorporated areas of Painted Hills and Mission Lakes.

== Enrollment ==
The student population in the 2022–2023 school year was 1,742.

== Notable alumni ==
- Jordan Mudge, football player
