= Cabot's Pueblo Museum =

Museum in Desert Hot Springs, California

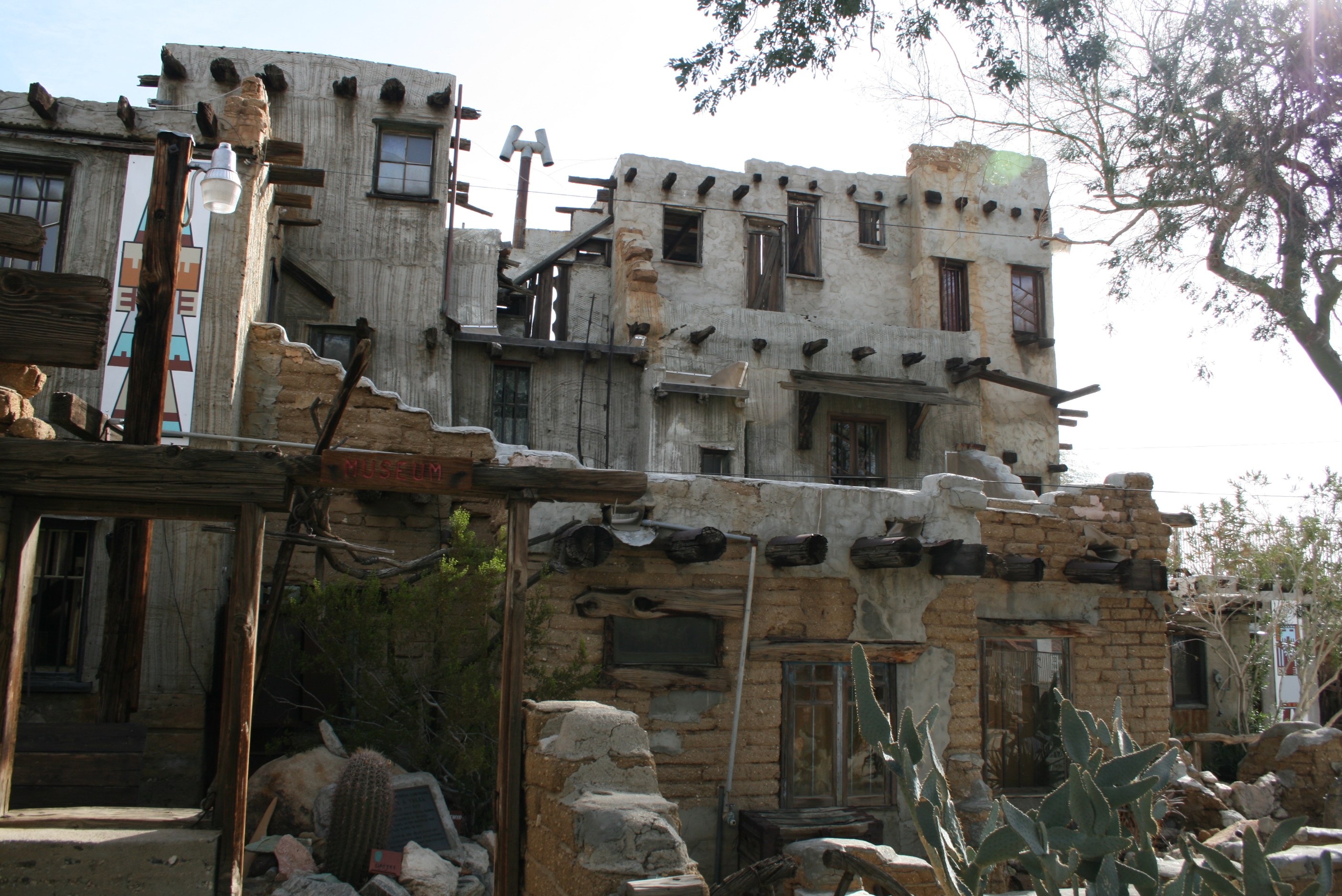
- Pueblo Museum – Main Building
- Established: 1945
- Location: 67-616 East Desert View Ave. Desert Hot Springs, California 33°57′29″N 116°28′56″W
- Type: Historic house museum
- Visitors: 10,000+ per year (2009)
- Curator: Cabot's Museum Foundation
- Public transit access: SunLine Transit Agency; Line 14
- Website: www.cabotsmuseum.org

Cabot's Pueblo Museum is an American historic house museum located in Desert Hot Springs, California, and built by Cabot Yerxa, an early pioneer of the Colorado Desert. A large, Hopi-style pueblo, built in the Pueblo Revival Style, it contains artworks, artifacts of American Indian and Alaska Native cultures, and memorabilia of early desert homesteader life. The museum may also be referred to as Cabot's Old Indian Pueblo Museum, Cabot's Trading Post or Yerxa's Discovery.

== Origins of the name ==
The house and surrounding structures were self-built by Cabot Abram Yerxa (1883–1965), an early 20th-century homesteader in the Coachella Valley. (Note: Yerxa was born on a Lakota Sioux reservation in the Dakota Territory. Before starting the Pueblo, he traveled to Alaska to sell cigars during the Nome Gold Rush, Cuba to develop real estate, and Mexico. His family owned an orange grove in Riverside, California, but lost the crop to freezing in 1913. During World War I, he served in the U.S. Army. Later he worked as the postmaster of Sierra Madre, California. His parents were long established in New England and New Brunswick. (Brown 2011, pp. 11–12.) Yerxa also subdivided property to create the town of Desert Hot Springs. (Niemann, Greg (2006). Palm Springs Legends: creation of a desert oasis. San Diego, CA: Sunbelt Publications. p. 189. ISBN 978-0932653741. OCLC 61211290. (here for Table of Contents)) The Palm Springs Unified School District Cabot Yerxa Elementary School in Desert Hot Springs is named in his honor.) It is named as "Cabot’s Old Indian Pueblo Museum" in its application for listing on the National Register of Historic Places. The California State Parks Office of Historic Preservation lists it as "Yerxa's Discovery".

== History ==
Yerxa was an adventurer who first settled on 160 acres (65 ha) in Southern California's Coachella Valley in 1913. He established his home, The Eagle's Nest, on a hill he would later name Miracle Hill. Using a pick and shovel to dig wells, Yerxa discovered two aquifers on opposite sides of the hill, which happened to be separated by the Mission Creek Fault, a branch of the San Andreas Fault. The first aquifer was a natural hot spring with a temperature of 110 °F (43 °C) in the Desert Hot Springs Sub-Basin and which would later help give rise to the area's spas and resorts. The second, on the opposite side of the fault, was a cold aquifer of the Mission Springs Sub-Basin. This same aquifer provides fresh water to the city of Desert Hot Springs and has received awards for exceptional taste.

In May, 1917, Yerxa left the desert to join the Army during World War I. He returned to the desert in 1937, and in 1939 began building a museum to house his collection of Native American and other artifacts. He fashioned the building as a Hopi Indian pueblo in honor of the Indian people, and he opened Cabot's Old Indian Pueblo in 1950. He operated it with his wife, Portia, until his death in 1965. Upon his death Portia returned to her native Texas and the structure was abandoned.

Yerxa's friend Cole Eyraud protected the settlement after his death and after it had been abandoned and vandalized. (Note: Cole Eyraud was a Burbank businessman who knew Yerxa in the past. Upon discovering the abandoned Pueblo, he purchased the complex and established Landmark Conservators to preserve the landmark. (Landmark Conservators, California Secretary of State Entity Number: C0561941, Filed: 01/29/1969) (Minckler 1986, p. 23.)) Eyraud and his family purchased the complex, restoring it and later donating it to the City of Desert Hot Springs.

== Architecture ==
The centerpiece of the complex is a large, Hopi-style pueblo, in the Pueblo Revival Style of architecture. The main building is a four-story, 5000 square foot (465 sq.m) structure with 35 rooms, 150 windows, 65 doors and 30 different roof levels. The pueblo and all the outbuildings on the site were built primarily from scrap wood and sheet metal all scavenged from the surrounding desert by Yerxa. It has a system of vents and shafts built into the walls to keep it cool in the summer.

== Exhibits ==
Waokiye looking west, with Pueblo Museum in background

Among the collections of the museum are:

- America Indian and Alaska Native artifacts, including Native American pottery
- Artwork of Yerxa
- Documents, including photographs and Yerxa related correspondence

A later addition to the site is that of the Waokiye, or "traditional helper" in the Lakota language. Waokiye is the twenty-seventh sculpture in a series of 74 giant Native American heads, collectively known as the Trail of the Whispering Giants, carved during a twenty-one-year period by artist Peter Wolf Toth. The 43-foot sculpture was carved with the use of power tools from a section of a 45-ton (46 metric ton) giant sequoia log. The 750-year-old tree, which originally stood in Sequoia National Park, had been felled by lightning in the mid-1950s. All but the feather in Waokiye's headband was carved from the log. The feather was carved from an incense cedar from the nearby mountain community of Idyllwild. The statue was unveiled on May 20, 1978; it was repaired and rededicated by Toth on February 21, 2009. At present, it is the only one of the sculptures left in California.

== Operations ==
The City of Desert Hot Springs owns the museum and it is operated by the Cabot's Museum Foundation, a non-profit corporation. Cabot's Museum Foundation is a member of the American Alliance of Museums. In 2008 the Museum Foundation opened "Cabot's Trading Post & Gallery" to feature artwork from local artists.

A set of 24 solar panels on a nearby hillside provides electric power to the museum. The museum is developing plans to expand visitor facilities including an amphitheater, hiking trails, and a cultural campus.

In 2009 numerous artifacts from the pueblo were removed to an undisclosed location. In 2010 the Balboa Art Conservation Center of San Diego, California, conducted a study of the museum and reported that improvements in air filtration, lighting, and landscape irrigation were needed.

=== Transportation ===
Line 14 of the SunLine Transit Agency serves Desert Hot Springs from Palm Springs.

== Bibliography ==
- Minckler, Karen; Bethany, Schroeder; Cole, Eyraud (1986). The Legend of Cabot Yerxa. Desert Hot Springs, CA: Cabot's Museum Foundation. OCLC 272397224.
- Raef, Laura (February 1970), "White Man's Pueblo" (PDF), Desert Magazine, pp. 8–9, 37, archived from the original (PDF) on December 2, 2011
  - Reprinted as Raef, Laura (February 1984), "White Man's Pueblo" (PDF), Desert Magazine, pp. 18–19, archived from the original (PDF) on December 2, 2011
- Roy, George M. (November 1952), "Cabot Yerxa's Crazy House" (PDF), Desert Magazine, vol. 15, no. 11, pp. 9–11, archived from the original (PDF) on December 2, 2011; Also available at: .
