= Primeval series 5 =

2011 series of British sci-fi programme

Primeval
- Series 5
- DVD box set cover art
- Starring: Ciarán McMenamin; Andrew-Lee Potts; Hannah Spearritt; Ben Miller; Alexander Siddig; Ben Mansfield; Ruth Kearney; Ruth Bradley; Janice Byrne
- No. of episodes: 6

Release
- Original network: Watch
- Original release: 24 May – 28 June 2011

Series chronology
- ← Previous; Series 4

The fifth and final series of the British science fiction programme Primeval began on 24 May 2011 and concluded on 28 June 2011 after airing six episodes. Primeval follows a team of scientists tasked with investigating the appearance of temporal anomalies across the United Kingdom through which prehistoric and futuristic creatures enter the present. The fifth series kept most of the cast intact from the fourth series, the two series having been produced and filmed back-to-back in 2010.

Given that Primeval had been unexpectedly cancelled by ITV in 2009 following the broadcast of its successful third series, the producers did not wish the fifth series to end on a cliffhanger in case the same happened again and as such wrote it to have a "very satisfying conclusion" in case Primeval was not renewed. The fifth series was written to be darker than the fourth and to explore the motives of main characters Philip Burton (Alexander Siddig) and Matt Anderson (Ciarán McMenamin) as well as answer key questions set up in preceding series. The fifth series also sought to stay more focused and to develop the key main characters, now a more unified team, further.

As part of the co-production deal that ensured the fourth and fifth series would be made, the fifth series aired first on the digital channel Watch in 2011 and then on ITV in 2012. Although it was considered a success on Watch, becoming its most watched series of the year, it received the lowest ratings in Primeval history when later broadcast on ITV. The disappointing viewing figures led to Primeval not being renewed for a sixth series even though both the cast and the production team were eager to continue. Despite the low ratings, critical reception of the fifth series was positive, with praise for the visual effects, character development and many homages to classic science fiction. The last two episodes, which marked Primeval's two-part conclusion, received particular praise by reviewers as the series going out on a high note.

== Episodes ==
No. overall	No. in series	Episode	Directed by	Written by	Original release date	UK viewers (millions)
31	1	Episode 1 "Matt's Secret"	Mark Everest	Chris Lang	24 May 2011	0.857 (Watch) 2.55 (ITV)
After a road worker falls into a giant opening and is killed by a giant burrowing insect, presumed from the future, the ARC team are called in to investigate. Meanwhile, Philip Burton (Alexander Siddig) introduces Connor Temple (Andrew-Lee Potts) to Prospero's "New Dawn" which will extract energy from the anomalies and stop the world's energy crisis. Philip also assigns Connor an assistant, April Leonard (Janice Byrne), to keep an eye on him. Connor makes a late appearance and joins the team in tracking down the giant insect after Abby Maitland (Hannah Spearritt) tells him that people are starting to notice his absence in the field, and is himself captured, and dragged to its nest in a shopping centre under construction, later to be rescued by Matt Anderson (Ciarán McMenamin) by means of explosives. Matt reveals his origin in the future and his mission to prevent the ARC causing a disaster to Abby and asks for her help.
32	2	Episode 2 "The Submarine"	Robert Quinn	Steve Bailie	31 May 2011	0.761 (Watch) 1.77 (ITV)
When a submarine encounters an anomaly and a prehistoric creature out at sea, Matt, Abby and Connor are brought aboard to investigate. Their plans to contain the creature and seal the anomaly prove difficult, especially when the submarine loses power and is pulled through the anomaly to the seas of the Jurassic period. With a young but dangerous dinosaur aboard the submarine, the ARC team then work alongside its naval counterparts to restore power and return through the anomaly before it closes or they are attacked by an oncoming pod of Liopleurodon. Back at the ARC, James Lester (Ben Miller) and Jess Parker (Ruth Kearney) have a battle of their own as they try and dissuade an admiral from nuking the anomaly. At the end of the episode Abby reveals to Matt what happened to Emily Merchant (Ruth Bradley) after she returned to the 19th century.
33	3	Episode 3 "In The Good Old Days"	Robert Quinn	Paul Mousley & Gabbie Asher	7 June 2011	0.755 (Watch) 1.85 (ITV)
An anomaly alert brings the team to the Gaiety Theatre where they encounter a dromaeosaur. The team send the creature through an anomaly which transpires to lead to Victorian London. Matt follows the dinosaur through to prevent it killing anyone but finds Emily who is doing the same. The pair then find themselves accused of being the mysterious Spring-Heeled Jack, killing several people actually killed by the dinosaur. Matt and Emily eventually stun the raptor and send it back. Matt reveals to Emily that her husband plans to have her confined in a madhouse and the pair head back to the present, being followed through the anomaly by her husband, Henry (Stephen Hogan), who holds Matt at gunpoint. The raptor awakes and kills Henry. Back at the ARC, Abby breaks into Connor's laboratory and copies the information on his computer, however Connor catches her. The episode concludes with Connor and April creating the first man-made anomaly.
34	4	Episode 4 "The Prototype"	Robert Quinn	Helen Raynor	14 June 2011	0.650 (Watch) 1.59 (ITV)
Connor uses his device to open an anomaly within the ARC. The team come to close it, but are ordered out of the laboratory by Philip who heads to "New Dawn" to collect data from the device. Connor tells Abby the purpose of the anomaly. Back at the ARC, a swarm of future beetles and their enormous queen come through the anomaly and kill a guard before spreading throughout the building after chewing through reinforced concrete. The ARC goes into lockdown trapping Matt, Connor, Abby, Becker (Ben Mansfield), Emily and Jess inside and they are forced to fight for survival. Jess is bitten by one of the beetles and has a reaction to the bite, slipping into unconsciousness while the team's initial plan to poison the creatures fails. Connor says he can trigger a gamma ray burst from his anomaly but Matt has already disabled the computer control. Matt is forced to reveal that he and Abby have a copy of the data on Connor's computer and they then use it to sterilise the ARC while they take cover in a panic room. Becker gets Jess the adrenaline she needs while Connor discovers that Philip had tried to incinerate the ARC with the team inside, and that he had been in communication with the terrorist Helen Cutter (Juliet Aubrey).
35	5	Episode 5 "The End of the Future: Part 1"	Cilla Ware	Michael A. Walker	21 June 2011	0.477 (Watch) 1.79 (ITV)
The ARC team is rushed off their feet and forced to split up when anomalies begin to open worldwide with creatures from many different eras slipping into the present day, including a Tyrannosaurus rex which goes on a rampage through central London. The anomalies and the creatures are finally public knowledge. At "New Dawn", Philip's device is activated with Matt and Emily racing to the scene to stop them. Abby and Connor join them while Becker, Lester, and Jess deal with the ongoing creature threat. After a fight with Abby, April is killed by a swarm of Anurognathus. Philip's device goes online and manages to seal the other anomalies by incorporating their energy into one large anomaly at the centre of the device, but Matt is certain that this is the beginning of the end. With time running out, Connor attempts to sabotage the machine at "New Dawn" but ends up being pulled through the giant anomaly to an unknown location.
36	6	Episode 6 "The End of the Future: Part 2"	Cilla Ware	Steve Bailie & Adrian Hodges	28 June 2011	0.496 (Watch) 1.38 (ITV)
After failing to stop Philip and having been pulled through the "New Dawn" anomaly, Connor finds himself in a barren wasteland where future predators are the only obvious life. At "New Dawn", Matt and Abby go through the anomaly to rescue Connor. In the future, Matt, Connor and Abby take shelter in an underground bunker as a vicious storm rages on the surface while back at the ARC, Connor's original anomaly reopens. The anomaly at "New Dawn" starts to cause atmospheric changes to the planet and as chaos breaks loose, Philip realises Helen Cutter has been using him to achieve her goal of destroying humanity. Matt, Connor and Abby are able to fight off future predators and make it back to the present. With their help Philip is able to gain control of "New Dawn" once more and Philip decides to sacrifice himself to destroy the installation with the hope that the anomaly will close. "New Dawn" is destroyed but the giant anomaly continues to grow. Back at the ARC several future predators come through Connor's anomaly, leaving Lester and Jess to hunt the beasts alone until the team returns. At the ARC the team join forces to defeat the future predators and Connor comes up with a plan to merge his miniature anomaly with the giant one and hopefully close them both. Using a containment device, the team are able to take the miniature anomaly to the "New Dawn" site where Matt drives it into the giant anomaly causing them to implode. Matt survives and the team are reunited and return to duties at the ARC. With everything seemingly back to normal and Connor and Abby going to get married, a new anomaly is detected and as the team head out to the field, Matt comes face to face with a battered version of himself who gives him a cryptic message.

== Cast ==
=== Main cast ===
- Ciarán McMenamin as Matt Anderson
- Andrew-Lee Potts as Connor Temple
- Hannah Spearritt as Abby Maitland
- Ben Miller as James Lester
- Alexander Siddig as Philip Burton
- Ben Mansfield as Captain Hilary Becker
- Ruth Kearney as Jess Parker
- Ruth Bradley as Emily Merchant
- Janice Byrne as April Leonard

=== Guest cast ===
- Juliet Aubrey as Helen Cutter
- Lucy Vigne Welsh as Miss Reece
- Patrick Murray as Anthony
- Bosco Hogan as Admiral Marston
- Allen Leech as Officer Sam Leonard
- Tom O'Súilleabháin as Captain Marcus Yates
- Sam Peter Corry as Submariner
- Stephen Hogan as Lord Henry Merchant
- Tom Maguire as Dr. Webster
- Phil Deguara as Local Man
- John Paul De Jonge as Puppeteer
- Ailbhe Casey as Jenna

== Production ==
=== Development and writing ===
The fifth series was envisioned as darker than the fourth. According to Primeval co-creator Tim Haines, the overarching plot of the fifth series was exploring the mysterious motives of Philip Burton (Alexander Siddig), tying them into the main storyline and explaining why Matt Anderson (Ciarán McMenamin), revealed in the fourth series to be from the future, was working for the ARC in the first place. Along with the fourth series, the fifth was also written to begin answering the key questions set up in the series, especially those surrounding the nature of the anomalies themselves.

Unlike the cast changes of the third and fourth series, the fifth series largely kept the same cast as the fourth series. This allowed the producers to write the central team as more unified and develop the characters further. According to co-creator Adrian Hodges, the producers felt that they by this point could "really take the characters where we want them to go, and confront them with darker things". The episodes of the fifth series were also written to be more focused.

In February 2011, the producers teased the return of characters Danny Quinn (Jason Flemyng) and Patrick Quinn (Jonathan Byrne) from the fourth series, though neither ultimately appeared in the fifth series. A new main character introduced in the fifth series was April Leonard, played by Janice Byrne. April is a lab assistant hired by Philip Burton to work on experimental research. She was written as almost a female version of Connor; attentive and scientifically minded, but also to be someone who the audience should be doubtful whether to trust.

The third episode of the fifth series was innovative in terms of plot for Primeval as it saw Matt travel back in time to Victorian London through an anomaly. Haines had always previously maintained that Primeval was "not to be a time travel show" but both he and Hodges liked the idea. Hodges pushed for the episode as a modest homage to Star Trek as he had always wanted to do a Star Trek episode. The storyline of the episode saw Matt and Emily Merchant (Ruth Bradley) track down a dromaeosaur loose in the Victorian era, mistaken as a murderer and as the infamous folklore figure Spring-Heeled Jack. In addition to featuring time travel, the episode also served to deepen the relationship between Matt and Emily and to, on account of its Victorian setting, "play up the melodrama".

The two final episodes were written as a two-part finale, uniting the series and the serial storylines and intended to "send this series out with a literal bang". Every character was written to have their own moment in the fifth episode. The finale was written to be a definite conclusion and also to show new perspectives on much of what had been shown before. It was also written to include a definite and satisfying conclusion to the relationship between Abby and Connor, a television relationship well received by critics during previous series.

=== Creatures ===
Tim Haines teased the appearances of several creatures in the fifth series on 11 February 2011, revealing the return of previously used creatures such as dromaeosaurs and the inclusion of new creatures, such as a form of burrowing creature and the "biggest creature" yet. Haines also revealed the return of the future predators, a signature creature of Primeval absent since the third series, though in a "slightly different guise". Further teases in February also revealed that one of the episodes would feature a swimming dromaeosaur and that the series would feature a Tyrannosaurus rex.

The burrowing creatures teased were giant future burrowing insects, which made their appearance in the first episode and were based on modern mole crickets. The swimming dromaeosaur featured in Primeval was revealed by Haines in a panel discussion on 7 February 2011 to be the Cretaceous theropod Balaur. (Note: Some other material alternatively identified the dinosaur as Eustreptospondylus.) Haines had wanted to feature a swimming theropod, picking Balaur since its native environment in Cretaceous Romania would have consisted of a group of islands (perhaps necessitating that it was adept at swimming). Balaur was given dark skin and red eyes in Primeval as an homage to Dracula since its fossils had been recovered in Transylvania.

=== Visual effects ===
Like for the fourth series, the visual effects of the fifth series were created by the visual effects company The Mill. At times, the budget of the fifth series necessitated cutting down on the intended number of creature shots for some episodes.

=== Filming ===
The first three series of Primeval were filmed primarily in London, though production for the fourth and fifth series moved to Ireland. The move was done both because of Irish tax incentives for filming and the ability to use locations unused in the series thus far. The urban scenes of the series were shot in Dublin. The fourth and fifth series were filmed back-to-back over a ten-month period. After the filming of the fourth series, from 22 March to 26 June 2010, the actors had a short break of a week and a half before beginning filming the fifth series. The filming of the fifth series finished in November 2010.

== Release ==
=== Broadcast and ratings ===
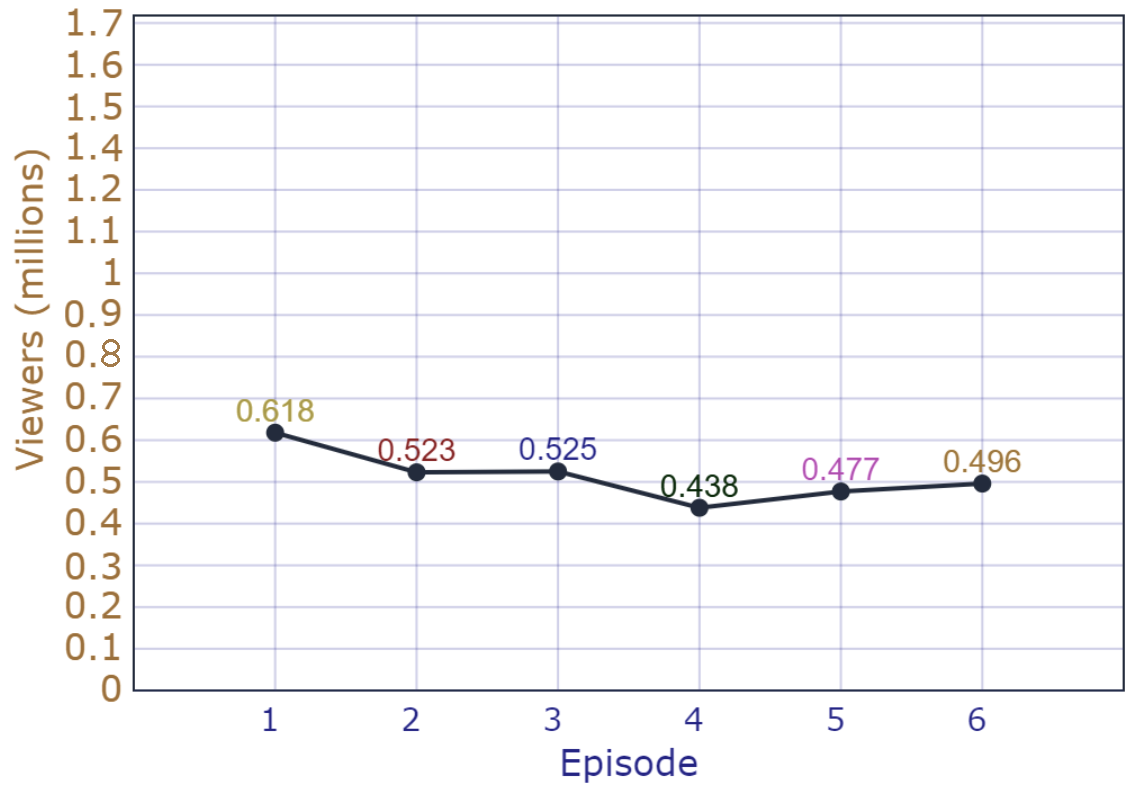
UK ratings for the episodes of the fifth series on Watch (2011)

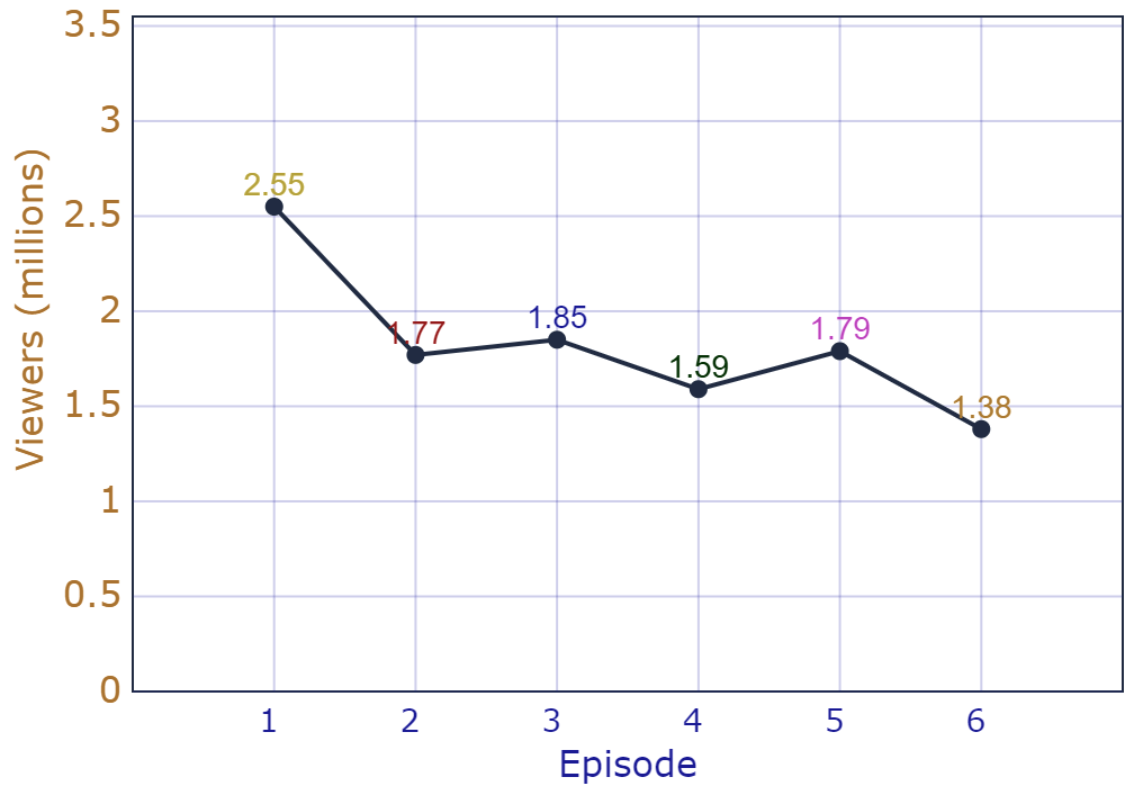
UK ratings for the episodes of fhe fifth series on ITV (2012)

The production of the fourth and fifth series was announced by ITV on 29 September 2009. A short preview clip from the opening episode was released on 5 May 2011, followed by a full-length trailer on 20 May. As part of the co-production deal which ensured the making of the fourth and fifth series, the fifth series first aired on the digital channel Watch from 24 May 2011 to 28 June 2011, where it averaged around 500,000 viewers. Though much lower than previous series broadcasts on the terrestrial channel ITV, these were large numbers relative to other digital channels and Watch considered the series a great success due to being their biggest of the year in terms of viewing figures. Watch aired the episodes on Tuesdays, a change to Primeval's traditional Saturday broadcasts.

The fifth series met with disappointing ratings when it was broadcast on ITV in 2012. The first episode, broadcast on 16 June 2012, had 2.93 million viewers (a 16.1% audience share; 2.55 million viewers on just ITV). Although this was the best ratings of ITV of the day, it lost out to the television quiz show Pointless Celebrities on BBC One. The finale's broadcast on ITV (21 July 2012) met with the lowest ratings in Primeval history, with only 1.38 million viewers (a 10.2% audience share).

The first episode was the most watched episode of the fifth series on both Watch and ITV (with 618,000 and 2.55 million viewers, respectively). Although the last episode marked the low point on ITV, the least watched episode on Watch was the fourth episode, with 438,000 viewers.

=== Home media ===
The DVD release of the fifth series included the behind-the-scenes documentary New Dawn - Making the New Primeval Part 2. The fifth series was also released on Blu-ray.

DVD title	Number and duration of episodes	Release date
Primeval: The Complete Series Five	6 x 45 min.	4 July 2011
Primeval: The Complete Series One - Five	36 x 45 min.	7 November 2011

== Critical reception ==
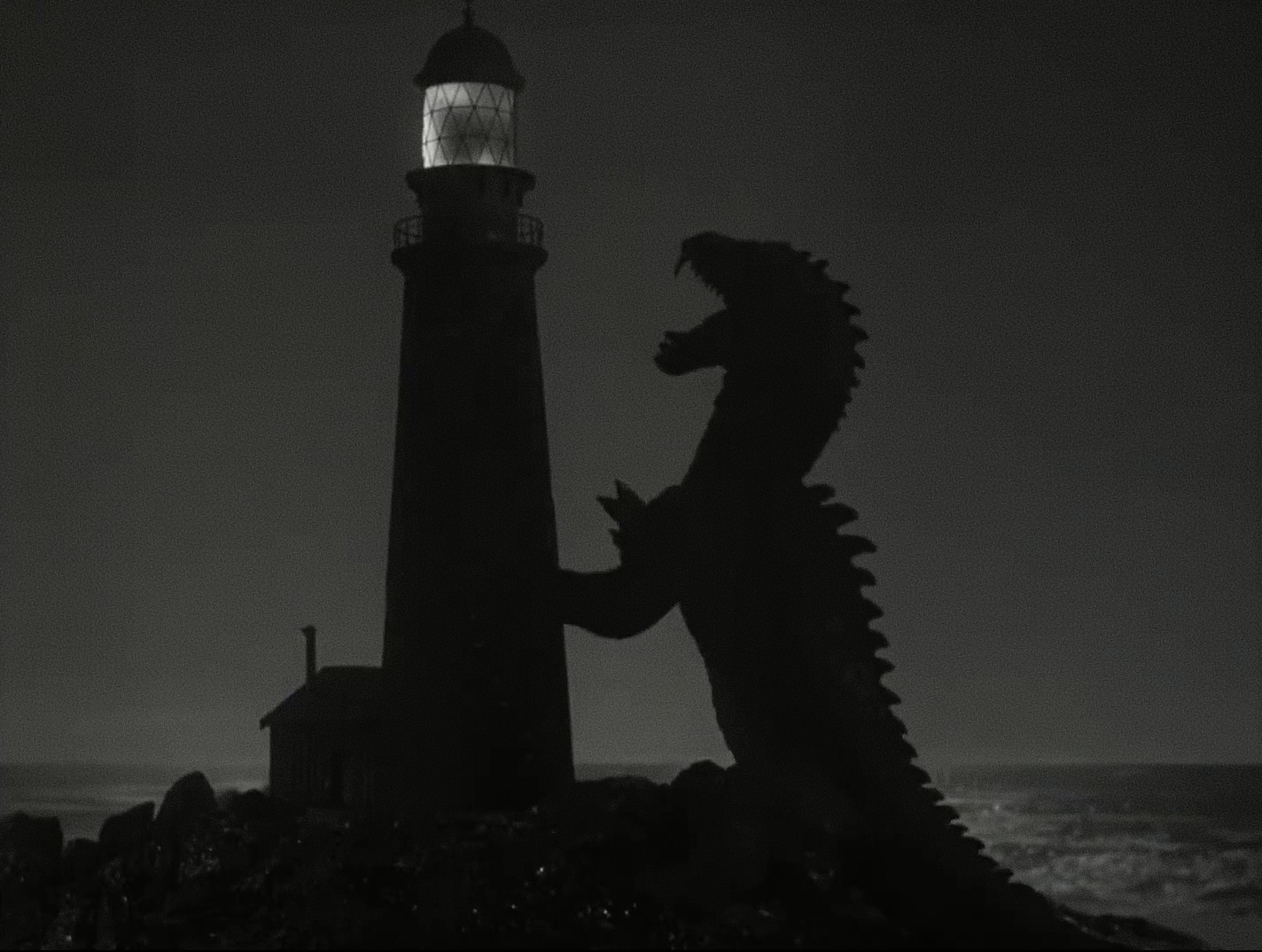
Several reviewers saw episodes of the fifth series as homages to classic science fiction works. Some presumed that The Beast From 20,000 Fathoms (pictured) was among the influences of the opening of the fifth episode.

Dan Owen of WhatCulture gave the opening episode of the fifth series a negative review, stating that the pace coming off of the previous series was washed away as the episode was "business as usual" despite the many reveals of the previous series's final episode. Owen criticised the plotline of the first episode as "weak and predictable" and felt that the cast of the fourth and fifth series was "by far [Primeval's] weakest line-up". Owen had a mixed perception of Primeval overall, though he praised the CGI of the series he felt that it "never achieved its huge potential to be Stargate-meets-Jurassic Park", that it failed to deliver substance in-between its action sequences, and that while it at times had fun ideas it was usually unable to implement them effectively.

Contrary to Owen, Robert McLaughlin of Den of Geek gave the first episode a positive review, considering it a "great, action-packed premiere" for the fifth series, "mixing the right amount of intrigue, monsters, explosions and expositions". McLaughlin reviewed the fifth series episode-by-episode. He found the second episode to be "quite epic", with a nice claustrophobic and suspenseful feel. McLaughlin also considered the third episode to be "pretty good", though he found some of the action and plot to be contrived and forced. He found the fourth episode to be akin to a "run of the mill 1980s monster in the shadows affair" but found it to "[rise] above the generic" for its subplot revolving around Connor and Abby beginning to plot against Philip; he particularly praised the cliffhanger at the end of the episode as the first on the series in a long time to be "actually tense". The fifth episode received particular praise, as a "great, gripping episode that steps up a gear or three". McLaughlin praised the visual effects of the series, writing that the CGI team had "excelled themselves". Though he found the series to not always "hit the heights of originality script-wise", he found the creatures used throughout the fifth series to be consistently "superb". He also sensed that many of the episodes of the series had been written as homages to classic films, with the second episode being an homage to classic aquatic horror such as The Abyss and DeepStar Six, the fourth episode to draw on The Mummy, and the opening of the fifth episode to be a "great homage to Harryhausen's The Beast From 20,000 Fathoms".

Paul Simpson of Sci-Fi Bulletin also reviewed each episode of the series individually. He found the first episode to be "nothing ground-breaking" but still enjoyable and a solid episode; all subsequent episodes were given high scores of 8/10. Simpson offered particular praise to the development of the characters and their relationships. He greatly praised the final episode as the series "going out with a bang" and commended it for the reintroduction of the future predators and for tying up many loose ends, as well as Alexander Siddig managing to "avoid too many clichés" in his villain performance. Like McLaughlin, Simpson also saw the series as homaging classic science fiction works, with the creatures of the first episode evoking the Bugs of Starship Troopers, the second episode Voyage to the Bottom of the Sea and the Doctor Who story The Claws of Axos, the fourth episode The Mummy and the opening of the fifth episode Godzilla.

Candice Grace of TV Equals found the first episode to be decent but predictable and enjoyed the second episode more, which she thought would have served better as a series premiere than its predecessor. Though viewing the four first episodes as mostly filler before the two-part finale, Grace greatly enjoyed the third episode, finding it to be one of the best of the series. She praised the series finale, finding the fifth episode to be the best of Primeval since the third series and the most "visually engrossing" in Primeval history and the sixth to also be among her favourites as an "entertaining finale" that wrapped up the storylines of the past two seasons. The ending itself received particular praise for its ambiguity over whether the team had actually managed to save the future. Grace criticised some of the female characters on the show, finding April's clichéd "geek" portrayal annoying and Jess to be pointless, but enjoyed the characterisations of both Abby and Emily, a character she had initially not enjoyed during the fourth series. Like other reviewers, she praised the CGI of the fifth series, particularly in the fifth episode.

Dave Golder of GamesRadar+ gave the fifth series a largely positive review, especially praising the second and fifth episodes. He considered the series to be "going out on a high", but felt that the final episode was somewhat mediocre, finding it "rather dull" with "some flashes of greatness"; although "spectacular" at points and with good character moments, Golder felt that the episode disappointed as a satisfying dramatic conclusion, lacking in surprises and revelations and being too predictable. Like the others, Golder also praised the effects as "top notch" and "excellent.

== Further series ==
The surprise 2009 cancellation of Primeval, despite its then successful run, in the wake of the third series ruined the potential of a number of plotlines and would have left the series ending on a cliffhanger had it not been recommissioned a few months later. The producers, although they had "every desire to make Series 6", were determined that the fifth series would not end in a similar way and wrote the ending of the series as a "very satisfying conclusion" in case it ended up being the final episode and to ensure any hiatus between series would not have the same impact as prior.

At the time of the broadcast of the fourth and fifth series, Adrian Hodges indicated that it was unlikely that another series would air before January 2013. According to Hodges, the production of a sixth series would have required the fifth series to not only do well on Watch but also sell well on DVD and get high ratings when it aired on ITV in 2012. Members of the cast at the time remained hopeful that a new series could get commissioned; Hannah Spearritt stated in an interview that Primeval has "been known to come back from the dead before". Ben Mansfield stated in 2017 that he did not feel that Primeval had run its course and that it still had potential to keep going after the fifth series even though it "wrapped things up nicely".

While speculation still surrounded whether a sixth series would be made, a North American spinoff, Primeval: New World was announced in September 2011. The low ratings of the fifth series on ITV in 2012 ensured that New World would be the only new Primeval media produced post-2011. New World was not a continuation of the original series, though it continued its mythology and saw some cameo appearances, and was envisioned as an "older, darker and scarier" version of the programme. New World was cancelled after only a single thirteen-episode season due to poor ratings.

Though "a little bit sad", Haines stated in a 2021 interview that the series has "been and gone". Also in 2021, Hodges stated that he would "do [another series] tomorrow, I'd do it in a heartbeat if I could"; though Andrew-Lee Potts was content with the ending, both he and Spearritt also stated in 2021 that they were interested in revisiting their characters.
