= List of Ancient Aliens episodes =

Ancient Aliens is an American television series that explores the pseudoscientific ancient astronauts hypothesis, as well as other pseudoscientific and pseudohistoric topics such as advanced ancient civilizations, extraterrestrial contact and ufology, and alleged conspiracy theories, in a non-critical documentary format. Episodes begin and end with rhetorical questions which frame the explored topics. The series has aired on History and other A&E Networks since 2010, and has been a target for criticism of History's channel drift, and criticism for promoting unorthodox or unproven hypotheses as fact. All episodes are narrated by Robert Clotworthy. The series is produced by Prometheus Entertainment.

The series is based on and inspired by the works of Erich von Däniken and Zecharia Sitchin, among other writers. The works of Graham Hancock, Robert Bauval, Brinsley Trench, Charles Hapgood, and Edgar Cayce are also referenced in many episodes. Producer Giorgio Tsoukalos and writer David Childress are often featured as guests.

The series began as a two-hour documentary special in 2009 and continued for three seasons as a flagship series on History. Seasons 4 to 7 aired on H2, with frequent re-airings of episodes on History and other A&E services. In 2015, the series returned to History after H2 was relaunched as Vice on TV. Season 15 premiered in 2020. The series continued with its sixteenth season in November 2020.

As of March 2026, 283 episodes of Ancient Aliens have aired.

== Series overview ==
Season	Episodes	Originally released	
Season	Episodes	First released	Last released
Pilot		March 8, 2009	
1	5	April 20, 2010	May 25, 2010
2	10	October 28, 2010	December 30, 2010
3	16	July 28, 2011	November 23, 2011
4	10	February 17, 2012	May 4, 2012
5	12	December 21, 2012	April 19, 2013
6	11	September 30, 2013	December 13, 2013
7	8	January 24, 2014	March 14, 2014
8	9	June 13, 2014	August 22, 2014
9	12	October 31, 2014	May 1, 2015
10	10	July 24, 2015	October 9, 2015
11	15	May 6, 2016	September 2, 2016
12	16	April 28, 2017	September 15, 2017
13	15	April 27, 2018	January 7, 2019
14	22	May 31, 2019	November 29, 2019
15	12	January 24, 2020	April 18, 2020
16	10	November 13, 2020	March 12, 2021
17	7	August 6, 2021	October 8, 2021
18	20	January 7, 2022	September 16, 2022
19	20	January 6, 2023	September 15, 2023
20	20	January 5, 2024	September 13, 2024
21	17	February 7, 2025	November 6, 2025
22	15	January 15, 2026	—

== Broadcast episodes ==
List of episodes broadcast using the Ancient Aliens title card. Availability of episodes is different in each broadcast market and language.

=== Season 1 (2009–10) ===
The 2009 documentary Ancient Aliens, produced by Kevin Burns, was a “love letter” to Erich von Däniken’s 1970 documentary Chariots of the Gods?. The documentary was retitled "Chariots, Gods & Beyond", and packaged as the pilot episode of Season 1. All episodes, except the pilot, carry the Ancient Aliens: The Series title card.

No. overall	No. in season	Title	Original release date
—	—	"Chariots, Gods & Beyond"	March 8, 2009
1	1	"The Evidence"	April 20, 2010
2	2	"The Visitors"	April 27, 2010
3	3	"The Mission"	May 4, 2010
4	4	"Closer Encounters"	May 18, 2010
5	5	"The Return"	May 25, 2010

=== Season 2 (2010) ===
No. overall	No. in season	Title	Original release date
6	1	"Mysterious Places"	October 28, 2010
7	2	"Gods and Aliens"	November 4, 2010
8	3	"Underwater Worlds"	November 11, 2010
9	4	"Underground Aliens"	November 18, 2010
10	5	"Aliens and the Third Reich"	November 25, 2010
11	6	"Alien Tech"	December 2, 2010
12	7	"Angels and Aliens"	December 9, 2010
13	8	"Unexplained Structures"	December 16, 2010
14	9	"Alien Devastations"	December 23, 2010
15	10	"Alien Contacts"	December 30, 2010

=== Season 3 (2011) ===
No. overall	No. in season	Title	Original release date
16	1	"Aliens and the Old West"	July 28, 2011
17	2	"Aliens and Monsters"	August 4, 2011
18	3	"Aliens and Sacred Places"	August 11, 2011
19	4	"Aliens and Temples of Gold"	August 18, 2011
20	5	"Aliens and Mysterious Rituals"	August 25, 2011
21	6	"Aliens and Ancient Engineers"	September 1, 2011
22	7	"Aliens, Plagues and Epidemics"	September 8, 2011
23	8	"Aliens and Lost Worlds"	September 15, 2011
24	9	"Aliens and Deadly Weapons"	September 22, 2011
25	10	"Aliens and Evil Places"	September 28, 2011
26	11	"Aliens and the Founding Fathers"	October 5, 2011
27	12	"Aliens and Deadly Cults"	October 12, 2011
28	13	"Aliens and the Secret Code"	October 19, 2011
29	14	"Aliens and the Undead"	October 26, 2011
30	15	"Aliens, Gods and Heroes"	November 16, 2011
31	16	"Aliens and the Creation of Man"	November 23, 2011

=== Season 4 (2012) ===
No. overall	No. in season	Title	Original release date
32	1	"The Mayan Conspiracy"	February 17, 2012
33	2	"The Doomsday Prophecies"	February 17, 2012
34	3	"The Greys"	February 24, 2012
35	4	"Aliens and Mega-Disasters"	March 2, 2012
36	5	"The NASA Connection"	March 9, 2012
37	6	"The Mystery of Puma Punku"	March 16, 2012
38	7	"Aliens and Bigfoot"	March 23, 2012
39	8	"The Da Vinci Conspiracy"	April 6, 2012
40	9	"The Time Travellers"	April 27, 2012
41	10	"Aliens and Dinosaurs"	May 4, 2012

=== Season 5 (2012–13) ===
No. overall	No. in season	Title	Original release date
42	1	"Secrets of the Pyramids"	December 21, 2012
43	2	"Aliens and Cover Ups"	December 28, 2012
44	3	"Alien Power Plants"	January 4, 2013
45	4	"Destination Orion"	January 11, 2013
46	5	"The Einstein Factor"	January 18, 2013
47	6	"Secrets of the Tombs"	January 25, 2013
48	7	"Prophets and Prophecies"	February 8, 2013
49	8	"Beyond Nazca"	February 15, 2013
50	9	"Strange Abductions"	February 22, 2013
51	10	"The Von Daniken Legacy"	April 5, 2013
52	11	"The Viking Gods"	April 12, 2013
53	12	"The Monoliths"	April 19, 2013

=== Season 6 (2013) ===
No. overall	No. in season	Title	Original release date
54	1	"The Power of Three"	September 30, 2013
55	2	"The Crystal Skulls"	October 7, 2013
56	3	"The Anunnaki Connection"	October 14, 2013
57	4	"Magic of the Gods"	October 21, 2013
58	5	"The Satan Conspiracy"	October 28, 2013
59	6	"Alien Operations"	November 1, 2013
60	7	"Emperors, Kings and Pharaohs"	November 8, 2013
61	8	"Mysterious Relics"	November 15, 2013
62	9	"Aliens and Forbidden Islands"	November 29, 2013
63	10	"Aliens and the Lost Ark"	December 6, 2013
64	11	"Aliens and Mysterious Mountains"	December 13, 2013

=== Season 7 (2014) ===
No. overall	No. in season	Title	Original release date
65	1	"Aliens and Stargates"	January 24, 2014
66	2	"Aliens in America"	January 31, 2014
67	3	"The Star Children"	February 7, 2014
68	4	"Treasures of the Gods"	February 14, 2014
69	5	"Aliens and the Red Planet"	February 21, 2014
70	6	"The Shamans"	February 28, 2014
71	7	"Aliens and Insects"	March 7, 2014
72	8	"Alien Breeders"	March 14, 2014

=== Season 8 (2014) ===
No. overall	No. in season	Title	Original release date
73	1	"Alien Transports"	June 13, 2014
74	2	"Mysterious Structures"	June 20, 2014
75	3	"Mysterious Devices"	June 27, 2014
76	4	"Faces of the Gods"	July 25, 2014
77	5	"The Reptilians"	July 25, 2014
78	6	"The Tesla Experiment"	August 1, 2014
79	7	"The God Particle"	August 8, 2014
80	8	"Alien Encounters"	August 15, 2014
81	9	"Aliens and Superheroes"	August 22, 2014

=== Season 9 (2014–15) ===
No. overall	No. in season	Title	Original release date
82	1	"Forbidden Caves"	October 31, 2014
83	2	"Mysteries of the Sphinx"	November 7, 2014
84	3	"Aliens Among Us"	November 14, 2014
85	4	"The Genius Factor"	November 21, 2014
86	5	"Secrets of the Mummies"	November 28, 2014
87	6	"Alien Resurrections"	December 5, 2014
88	7	"Alien Messages"	December 19, 2014
89	8	"The Great Flood"	December 23, 2014
90	9	"Aliens and the Civil War"	April 10, 2015
91	10	"Hidden Pyramids"	April 17, 2015
92	11	"The Vanishings"	April 24, 2015
93	12	"The Alien Agenda"	May 1, 2015

=== Season 10 (2015) ===
No. overall	No. in season	Title	Original release date
94	1	"Aliens B.C."	July 24, 2015
95	2	"NASA's Secret Agenda"	July 31, 2015
96	3	"Aliens and Robots"	August 7, 2015
97	4	"Dark Forces"	August 14, 2015
98	5	"The Alien Evolution"	August 21, 2015
99	6	"The Other Earth"	August 28, 2015
100	7	"Creatures of the Deep"	September 4, 2015
101	8	"Circles from the Sky"	September 18, 2015
102	9	"The Alien Wars"	October 2, 2015
103	10	"The Forbidden Zones"	October 9, 2015

=== Season 11 (2016) ===
No. overall	No. in season	Title	Original release date
104	1	"Pyramids of Antarctica"	May 6, 2016
105	2	"Destination Mars"	May 13, 2016
106	3	"The Next Humans"	May 20, 2016
107	4	"The New Evidence"	May 27, 2016
108	5	"The Visionaries"	June 10, 2016
109	6	"Decoding the Cosmic Egg"	June 17, 2016
110	7	"The Wisdom Keepers"	June 24, 2016
111	8	"The Mysterious Nine"	July 8, 2016
112	9	"The Hidden Empire"	July 15, 2016
113	10	"The Prototypes"	July 22, 2016
114	11	"Space Station Moon"	July 29, 2016
115	12	"Russia's Secret Files"	August 12, 2016
116	13	"Beyond Roswell"	August 19, 2016
117	14	"The Returned"	August 26, 2016
118	15	"Shiva the Destroyer"	September 2, 2016

=== Season 12 (2017) ===
No. overall	No. in season	Title	Original release date
119	1	"The Alien Hunters"	April 28, 2017
120	2	"Forged by the Gods"	May 5, 2017
121	3	"The Mystery of Rudloe Manor"	May 12, 2017
122	4	"The Alien Architects"	May 19, 2017
123	5	"The Pharaoh's Curse"	May 26, 2017
124	6	"The Science Wars"	June 2, 2017
125	7	"City of the Gods"	June 9, 2017
126	8	"The Alien Frequency"	June 16, 2017
127	9	"The Majestic Twelve"	July 7, 2017
128	10	"The Akashic Record"	July 14, 2017
129	11	"Voices of the Gods"	July 21, 2017
130	12	"The Animal Agenda"	July 28, 2017
131	13	"The Replicants"	August 4, 2017
132	14	"A Spaceship Made of Stone"	August 11, 2017
133	15	"The Alien Disks"	September 8, 2017
134	16	"Return to Göbekli Tepe"	September 15, 2017

=== Season 13 (2018–19) ===
No. overall	No. in season	Title	Original release date
135	1	"The UFO Conspiracy"	April 27, 2018
136	2	"Da Vinci's Forbidden Codes"	May 4, 2018
137	3	"The Alien Protocols"	May 11, 2018
138	4	"Earth's Black Holes"	May 18, 2018
139	5	"The Desert Codes"	May 25, 2018
140	6	"Area 52"	June 1, 2018
141	7	"Earth Station Egypt"	July 20, 2018
142	8	"Island of the Giants"	July 27, 2018
143	9	"The Taken"	August 3, 2018
144	10	"The Sentinels"	August 10, 2018
145	11	"Russia Declassified"	August 17, 2018
146	12	"They Came from the Sky"	August 24, 2018
147	13	"The Artificial Human"	August 31, 2018
148	14	"The Alien Phenomenon"	January 4, 2019
149	15	"Return to Mars"	January 7, 2019

=== Season 14 (2019) ===
No. overall	No. in season	Title	Original release date
150	1	"Return to Antarctica"	May 31, 2019
151	2	"The Badland's Guardian"	June 7, 2019
152	3	"Element 115"	June 14, 2019
153	4	"The Star Gods of Sirius"	June 21, 2019
154	5	"They Came from the Sea"	June 28, 2019
155	6	"Secrets of the Maya"	July 5, 2019
156	7	"The Druid Connection"	July 19, 2019
157	8	"The Reptilian Agenda"	July 26, 2019
158	9	"The Alien Infection"	August 2, 2019
159	10	"Project Hybrid"	August 9, 2019
160	11	"The Trans-Dimensionals"	August 16, 2019
161	12	"Islands of Fire"	August 23, 2019
162	13	"The Constellation Code"	August 30, 2019
163	14	"The Nuclear Agenda"	September 6, 2019
164	15	"The Alien Mountain"	October 4, 2019
165	16	"The Alien Brain"	October 11, 2019
166	17	"The Secrets of Stonehenge"	October 18, 2019
167	18	"Food of the Gods"	November 1, 2019
168	19	"Human Hieroglyphs"	November 8, 2019
169	20	"The Storming of Area 51"	November 15, 2019
170	21	"Countdown to Disclosure"	November 22, 2019
171	22	"Secrets of the Exoplanets"	November 29, 2019

=== Season 15 (2020) ===
No. overall	No. in season	Title	Original release date
172	1	"The Mystery of Nan Madol"	January 25, 2020
173	2	"The Relics of Roswell"	February 1, 2020
174	3	"Destination Chile"	February 8, 2020
175	4	"The Real Men in Black"	February 15, 2020
176	5	"The Mystery of the Stone Giants"	February 22, 2020
177	6	"The World Before Time"	February 29, 2020
178	7	"They Came from the Pleiades"	March 7, 2020
179	8	"The Immortality Machine"	March 14, 2020
180	9	"The Shapeshifters"	March 21, 2020
181	10	"The Mystery of Skinwalker Ranch"	March 28, 2020
182	11	"The Ultimate Guide to UFOs"	April 11, 2020
183	12	"Aliens and the Presidents"	April 18, 2020

=== Season 16 (2020–21) ===
No. overall	No. in season	Title	Original release date	U.S. viewers (millions)
184	1	"The Divine Number"	November 13, 2020	1.14
185	2	"The Lost Kingdom"	November 20, 2020	0.96
186	3	"The Galactic Keyhole"	December 4, 2020	0.99
187	4	"Giants of the Mediterranean"	December 11, 2020	0.93
188	5	"The Forbidden Bible"	December 18, 2020	1.02
189	6	"William Shatner Meets Ancient Aliens"	February 12, 2021	0.95
190	7	"Impossible Artifacts"	February 19, 2021	1.00
191	8	"The Space Travellers"	February 26, 2021	0.94
192	9	"The UFO Pioneers"	March 5, 2021	0.91
193	10	"The Harmonic Code"	March 12, 2021	0.83

=== Season 17 (2021) ===
No. overall	No. in season	Title	Original release date
194	1	"The Lost City of Peru"	August 6, 2021
195	2	"Top Ten Mysterious Sites"	August 13, 2021
196	3	"Top Ten Alien Cover-Ups"	August 20, 2021
197	4	"The Mystery of Mount Shasta"	September 17, 2021
198	5	"The Human Experiment"	September 24, 2021
199	6	"Top Ten Alien Encounters"	October 1, 2021
200	7	"Top Ten Alien Artifacts"	October 8, 2021

=== Season 18 (2022) ===
Six episodes were broadcast as Ancient Aliens on Location. The special episodes include highlights from previously broadcast episodes as well as on location segments.

No. overall	No. in season	Title	Original release date
201	1	"The Disclosure Event"	January 7, 2022
202	2	"Mystery of the Standing Stones"	January 14, 2022
203	3	"Beneath the Sacred Temples"	January 21, 2022
204	4	"The World on Alert"	January 28, 2022
205	5	"Recovering the Ark of the Covenant"	February 11, 2022
206	6	"Secrets of the Star Ancestors"	February 18, 2022
207	7	"Alien Air Force"	February 25, 2022
208	8	"The Shadow People"	March 4, 2022
209	9	"Decoding the Dragon Gods"	March 11, 2022
210	10	"The Time Benders"	March 18, 2022
211	11	"Ancient Aliens on Location: Incredible Structures"	July 8, 2022
212	12	"Ancient Aliens on Location: Extraordinary Encounters"	July 15, 2022
213	13	"Ancient Aliens on Location: Decoding the Alien Glyphs"	July 22, 2022
214	14	"Ancient Aliens on Location: The UFO Investigations"	July 29, 2022
215	15	"Ancient Aliens on Location: Mysterious Artifacts"	August 5, 2022
216	16	"Ancient Aliens on Location: Evidence of Alien Life"	August 12, 2022
217	17	"The Shining Ones"	August 19, 2022
218	18	"Journey to Immortality"	August 26, 2022
219	19	"Secrets of Inner Earth"	September 9, 2022
220	20	"Return of the Egyptian Gods"	September 16, 2022

=== Season 19 (2023) ===
No. overall	No. in season	Title	Original release date	U.S. viewers (millions)
221	1	"The Hotspots Connection"	January 6, 2023	0.80
222	2	"The Crop Circle Code"	January 13, 2023	?
223	3	"Mystery of the Lost Civilization"	January 20, 2023	?
224	4	"The Power of the Obelisks"	February 3, 2023	?
225	5	"The MUFON Files"	February 10, 2023	?
226	6	"Cosmic Impacts"	February 17, 2023	?
227	7	"Close Encounters of the Fifth Kind"	February 24, 2023	?
228	8	"The Mysteries of Alaska"	March 3, 2023	?
229	9	"Aliens in our Airspace"	March 10, 2023	?
230	10	"The Giants of Malta"	March 17, 2023	?
231	11	"The Top Ten Pyramid Sites"	June 30, 2023	?
232	12	"The Top Ten Mysterious Devices"	July 7, 2023	?
233	13	"The Top Ten Mysterious Islands"	July 14, 2023	?
234	14	"The Top Ten Alien Craft"	July 21, 2023	?
235	15	"Edgar Cayce: The Sleeping Prophet"	August 4, 2023	?
236	16	"The Gods of Greece"	August 11, 2023	?
237	17	"The New UFO Hunters"	August 18, 2023	?
238	18	"The Power of the Talisman"	August 25, 2023	?
239	19	"The Top Ten Mysteries of the Deep"	September 8, 2023	?
240	20	"The Top Ten Alien Petroglyphs"	September 15, 2023	?

=== Season 20 (2024) ===
No. overall	No. in season	Title	Original release date	U.S. viewers (millions)
241	1	"The Top Ten Alien Influencers"	January 5, 2024	0.72
242	2	"The Top Ten Extraordinary Creatures"	January 12, 2024	0.66
243	3	"The Top Ten Hidden Alien Bases"	January 19, 2024	0.69
244	4	"The Top Ten Scariest Encounters"	February 2, 2024	0.73
245	5	"The Top Ten Alien Codes"	February 9, 2024	0.70
246	6	"The Top Ten Alien Disasters"	February 16, 2024	0.63
247	7	"Secrets of the Sumerians"	February 23, 2024	0.82
248	8	"The UFO Superhighway"	March 1, 2024	0.69
249	9	"Mysteries of Scotland"	March 8, 2024	?
250	10	"Mystery of the Stone Spheres"	March 15, 2024	?
251	11	"Mysteries of the Maya"	June 28, 2024	?
252	12	"Unlocking the Stargates"	July 5, 2024	?
253	13	"The Whistleblowers"	July 12, 2024	?
254	14	"The Search for Extraterrestrial Intelligence"	July 19, 2024	?
255	15	"Jacques Vallée: UFO Pioneer"	August 9, 2024	?
256	16	"The Teachers"	August 16, 2024	?
257	17	"Egypt's Giant Tombs"	August 23, 2024	?
258	18	"The Linda Moulton Howe Files"	August 30, 2024	?
259	19	"The Chosen"	September 6, 2024	?
260	20	"Resurrecting Puma Punku"	September 13, 2024	?

=== Season 21 (2025) ===
No. overall	No. in season	Title	Original release date	U.S. viewers (millions)
261	1	"The Top Ten Extraordinary Discoveries"	February 7, 2025	?
262	2	"The Top Ten Mysterious Monoliths"	February 14, 2025	?
263	3	"The Top Ten UFO Crashes"	February 21, 2025	?
264	4	"The Top Ten Unexplained Technology"	February 28, 2025	?
265	5	"The Top Ten Secret Projects"	March 7, 2025	?
266	6	"The Top Ten Mysterious Mountains"	March 14, 2025	?
267	7	"Mysteries of the Aztecs"	March 21, 2025	?
268	8	"The Glowing Orb Phenomenon"	March 28, 2025	?
269	9	"The Legacy of J. Allen Hynek"	August 29, 2025	?
270	10	"The Volcano Factor"	September 5, 2025	?
271	11	"The Birdman Mystery"	September 12, 2025	?
272	12	"The Abduction Files"	September 19, 2025	?
273	13	"The Giants"	October 2, 2025	?
274	14	"Aliens In Our Midst"	October 9, 2025	?
275	15	"Britain’s UFO Files"	October 16, 2025	?
276	16	"Mysteries Of The Norse Gods"	October 23, 2025	?
277	17	"Secrets of Japan"	November 6, 2025	?

=== Season 22 (2026) ===
No. overall	No. in season	Title	Original release date	U.S. viewers (millions)
278	1	"Skulls of the Gods"	January 15, 2026	?
279	2	"Egypt's Lost Pyramid"	January 22, 2026	?
280	3	"Islands of the Gods"	January 29, 2026	?
281	4	"Extraterrestrial Engineering"	February 5, 2026	?
282	5	"UFO Hot Spots"	February 26, 2026	?
283	6	"Mysterious Monuments"	March 5, 2026	?
284	7	"Underwater Alien Bases"	June 11, 2026	?
285	8	"Secrets of the Vedas"	June 18, 2026	?
286	9	"Wars of the Gods"	June 25, 2026	?
287	10	"UFO Sightings"	July 2, 2026	?
288	11	"Alien A.I."	July 9, 2026	?
289	12	"Hidden Messages"	July 16, 2026	?
290	13	"Secrets of the Amazon"	July 23, 2026	?
291	14	"Alien Investigators"	July 30, 2026	?
292	15	"Africa's Extraterrestrial Contact"	August 6, 2026	?

== Special episodes ==
Special episodes which include new footage in addition to selections from previously broadcast episodes. Availability of special episodes depends on the broadcast market and language.

=== Special Edition (2014) ===
Ancient Aliens: Special Edition is a package of four episodes featuring highlights from previously broadcast episodes, extended interviews with guests, and new audio and visual effects. Episodes were made available for international syndication and digital purchase using the Special Edition title card, and later broadcast as part of Season 8.

No. in season	Title	Original release date
1	"Alien Transports"	June 13, 2014
2	"Mysterious Structures"	June 20, 2014
3	"Mysterious Devices"	June 27, 2014
4	"Faces of the Gods"	July 25, 2014

=== The Ultimate Evidence (2015) ===
Ancient Aliens: The Ultimate Evidence is a repackage of previously broadcast episodes presented by Giorgio Tsoukalos. Episodes were made available for international syndication, and are frequently bundled with Seasons 9 or 10 on streaming or digital home video.

No. in season	Title	Original release date
1	"Beyond Nazca"	May 15, 2015
2	"The Monoliths"	May 22, 2015
3	"The Tesla Experiment"	May 29, 2015
4	"Alien Power Plants"	June 5, 2015
5	"The Mystery of Puma Punku"	June 12, 2015
6	"Alien Messages"	June 19, 2015
7	"Aliens and the Lost Ark"	June 26, 2015
8	"Aliens and the Creation of Man"	July 3, 2015

=== Special Presentation (2022–2024) ===
Ancient Aliens: Special Presentation features highlights from previously broadcast episodes in a 90-minute format similar to Season 1. Many segments from older episodes are presented in high-definition for the first time, in addition to new interview footage and updated special effects.

==== Season 1 (2022–23) ====
No. overall	No. in season	Title	Original release date
1	1	"Aliens and Human Evolution"	September 26, 2022
2	2	"Aliens and Strange Creatures"	October 3, 2022
3	3	"Aliens and Unexplained Engineering"	October 10, 2022
4	4	"Aliens and Lost Civilizations"	October 17, 2022
5	5	"Aliens and the United States"	October 24, 2022
6	6	"Mysteries of the Outer Realms"	October 31, 2022
7	7	"Alien Codes and Messages"	November 7, 2022
8	8	"Energy Lines and Hot Spots"	November 21, 2022
9	9	"Aliens and the Superhuman Mind"	November 28, 2022
10	10	"Gone without a Trace"	December 12, 2022
11	11	"Mission to Outer Space"	December 19, 2022
12	12	"The Global Connection"	December 26, 2022
13	13	"Strange Visitors"	January 2, 2023

==== Season 2 (2023–24) ====
No. overall	No. in season	Title	Original release date
14	1	"Unidentified Aerial Phenomena"	October 2, 2023
15	2	"Extraterrestrial Informants"	October 9, 2023
16	3	"Interstellar Fallout"	October 16, 2023
17	4	"Extraterrestrial Close Encounters"	October 23, 2023
18	5	"Aliens and the Buried Past"	October 30, 2023
19	6	"Mysteries Beneath the Ice"	November 13, 2023
20	7	"Alien Outposts"	November 27, 2023
21	8	"Aliens and Mysterious Texts"	December 4, 2023
22	9	"Aliens and World Leaders"	December 11, 2023
23	10	"Alien Effigies"	December 18, 2023
24	11	"Extraterrestrial Pyramids"	January 1, 2024
25	12	"Aliens and the Unseen"	January 18, 2024

=== Origins (2024–26) ===
Ancient Aliens: Origins is a repackage of previously broadcast episodes in a panel discussion format, in addition to new on location segments and interviews. The series is similar to Ancient Aliens: Special Presentation.

==== Season 1 (2024–25) ====
No. overall	No. in season	Title	Original release date
1	1	"Extraordinary Engineering"	October 7, 2024
2	2	"Unidentified Flying Objects"	October 14, 2024
3	3	"Sky Gods And Star Beings"	October 21, 2024
4	4	"Human Genesis"	October 28, 2024
5	5	"Mysterious Underground Worlds"	November 4, 2024
6	6	"Alien Arsenal"	November 18, 2024
7	7	"Mystery of the Pyramids"	November 25, 2024
8	8	"Alien Observatories"	December 2, 2024
9	9	"Extraterrestrial Devices"	December 9, 2024
10	10	"Submerged Evidence Airs"	December 16, 2024
11	11	"Alien Beacons"	December 30, 2024
12	12	"Alien Messengers"	January 5, 2025

==== Season 2 (2025–26) ====
No. overall	No. in season	Title	Original release date
13	1	"Extraterrestrial Teachers"	October 6, 2025
14	2	"Extraterrestrial Rituals"	October 13, 2025
15	3	"Gateways to the Stars"	October 20, 2025
16	4	"Otherworldly Rulers"	October 27, 2025
17	5	"Extraterrestrial Deluge"	November 3, 2025
18	6	"The Cryptid Mystery"	November 17, 2025
19	7	"Are We Alone?"	November 24, 2025
20	8	"Messengers Among Us"	December 1, 2025
21	9	"Aliens Reinventions"	December 8, 2023
22	10	"Alien Brotherhoods and Codes"	December 15, 2025
23	11	"Alien Time Travelers"	December 29, 2025
24	12	"Extraterrestrial Lairs"	January 5, 2026
