= Future predator =

Fictional species

- A future predator attacking Connor Temple (Andrew-Lee Potts)
- First appearance: Series 1 Episode 6; 17 March 2007
- Last appearance: Series 5 Episode 6; 28 June 2011
- Created by: Tim Haines & Adrian Hodges (concept); Daren Horley (design)

In-universe information
- Type: Future descendant of bats

The future predator is a fictional future apex predator in the British science fiction television programme Primeval. The future predator was conceived by producers Tim Haines and Adrian Hodges and was designed by Daren Horley. Giant and flightless future descendants of bats, the predators are ruthless creatures that appear several times throughout the series. They were positively received and have been termed by some commentators as the "Daleks of Primeval" owing to their repeated appearances and how difficult they are to stop.

== Description and design ==
The central story of Primeval revolves around time portals (called "anomalies") opening up and letting through various prehistoric creatures into the present. While making the programme, the producers concluded that anomalies should logically be able to connect the present to the future as well. The future predators are flightless macropredatory future descendants of bats about the size of lions. They walk on their knuckles and are quadrupedal, though are also able to run and rear up bipedally at times. With their elongated arms, evolved from the wings of their ancestors, they are also able to leap and climb. Since the predators rely on advanced echolocation to hunt, their eyes have atrophied away.

The design of the future predator was created by Daren Horley, the Digital Textures Lead on the series. The description Horley received to work with was that the future predator was to be a sinister-looking (but not too fanciful) quadrupedal creature which could also rear up on two legs. Horley decided that the creature would be eyeless since this would make it more strange. The predator was initially going to be a reptile, with a dinosaur-inspired head design, but Horley changed this to the later used more unusual design after feedback from Tim Haines, the executive producer. It is possible that the concept of the future predator being a bat-descendant was inspired by the night stalker, a future giant predatory flightless bat featured in Dougal Dixon's 1981 speculative evolution book After Man; Dixon himself believes the night stalker to have been the inspiration. Other presumed sources of inspiration for the creature include the creatures of the Alien (aspects of the design and for inspiration for various shots in the episodes) and Predator (particularly for the echolocation) film series.

Though they were maintained to have been bat descendants throughout Primeval, the design of the future predators, particularly their body plan also strongly evokes primates. Whether the future predators are natural future descendants of bats or were bioengineered is never fully made clear in the programme; some commentators have suggested that they are, alongside bats, also perhaps intended to be linked to humans. Their origin story might also change throughout the programme as no matter what changes are made in the present, the future predators continue to appear.

== Appearances ==
The future predators make their debut in episode six (the finale) of the first series of Primeval when a family of future predators were first transported by an anomaly into the Permian period and then to the Forest of Dean in the present. The father future predator is killed in the present by Nick Cutter (Douglas Henshall) and the mother is killed in the Permian in a fight with an Inostrancevia, which also eats most of the young predators. The future predators made their return in series two, appearing in both episode six and seven (the finale). This time, future predators have been captured by Helen Cutter (Juliet Aubrey) and brought to the present, where Oliver Leek (Karl Theobald) uses neural clamps to control them. In episode six, one of the controlled future predators nearly kills James Lester (Ben Miller), the head of the ARC (Anomaly Research Center) until it was killed by a Columbian mammoth. In episode seven, Nick Cutter disabled the neural clamps, causing the predators to first attack and kill Leek, then kill Stephen Hart (James Murray) and then turn on each other and wipe themselves out.

Series three saw the future predators appear several times. They made brief appearances in both episode one (when they appear in the future and attack some soldiers) and episode four (when one is depicted being experimented on) before making a major return in episode eight. Episode eight saw main characters Danny Quinn (Jason Flemyng), Captain Becker (Ben Mansfield), Connor Temple (Andrew-Lee Potts) and Abby Maitland (Hannah Spearritt) step through an anomaly into the future, where they encounter numerous future predators in the ruins of a city. The future predators also made brief appearances in both episode nine and ten (the finale). After being absent throughout series four, the future predators made their last return in episode six (the finale) of series 5, which sees an incursion from mutated future predators from a future where the organization New Dawn has managed to reduce the Earth to a dying wasteland.

== Reception ==
The future predators have been described as an iconic creature of the series. Their ability to move and kill without being seen has been described as "almost supernatural". Their appearance in Primeval marked a turning point in the series since they were the first non-prehistoric creature to appear in the programme. The storyline accompanying the creature's first appearance was also strikingly different, exploring temporal paradoxes and the impact changing the past could have on the present. In later series of Primeval, further future creatures would also be introduced. The introductory episode of the future predator was ranked as the fourth best episode of the entire series by Philip Lickley of Den of Geek in 2012 and David Selby of CultFix ranked the future predator as the best creature of the series in 2013.

Some commentators have referred to the future predators, on account of their repeated appearances in the series and how difficult they are to deal with, as the Daleks of Primeval. Andrew-Lee Potts, who starred in Primeval, thought the future predator was one of the standout creatures in the series. Potts also compared the predator to the Daleks, though noted that the predators could "move a hell of a lot faster", and saw it as a creature straight out of a horror film. Douglas Henshall, who also starred in the series, likewise found the design to be "terrific", particularly since he felt it could actually be a proper animal. The palaeontologist Darren Naish praised the design of the future predator in a 2012 article for successfully incorporating numerous bat-like qualities despite its weird appearance, size and lack of flight, such as how the creature runs in a similar way to a vampire bat.

The future predators have been compared to the Death Angels featured in the 2018 post-apocalyptic horror film A Quiet Place, though it is not known whether the designers for that film drew on the future predators for inspiration.
