= Lucy Brown =

British actress

- Born: 13 February 1979 (age 47); Crawley, West Sussex, England
- Years active: 2002–present
- Spouse: Adam Rayner (m. 2015)
- Children: 2

Lucy Brown (born 13 February 1979) is a British actress best known for dual roles in the science fiction TV series Primeval.

== Biography ==
=== Early life ===
Lucy Brown was born in Crawley, Sussex, but grew up in Cambridgeshire. She is the daughter of Christopher Brown and Helen Burleigh and has a younger brother named Mark. She went to King's College Prep School in Cambridge and then on to Oundle School in Northamptonshire which she left to attend Hills Road Sixth Form College in Cambridge. She then went on to graduate from the Guildhall School of Music and Drama London. In December 2007, she was declared "Most Beautiful English Actress of the Year" by a panel of 104 actors.

=== Acting career ===
Brown's first job was in a commercial for the soap brand Lux where she appeared with Gisele Bündchen. She has appeared in Sharpe's Challenge, Malice Aforethought, North and South with Richard Armitage, Whatever Love Means, and in the dual roles of Claudia Brown and Jenny Lewis in the ITV1 science-fiction television series Primeval (2007–11). After leaving Primeval, she played a minor role in NBC's The Philanthropist. In 2010, she appeared in Bonded By Blood and Frost opposite Dean Cain. Brown returned to Primeval for Series 4 (as Jenny Lewis).

Brown also frequently takes part in live events billed as Word Theatre. She has performed for them in Los Angeles and London. She also reads for audio books.

In 2012, Brown said revealed that she and Olivia Poulet were currently writing a comedy drama. In 2014, she appeared in the television drama The Village, cast as Harriet Kilmartin.

=== Personal life ===
Brown lives in London. She married actor Adam Rayner on 31 December 2015. They have a son and daughter together.

== Filmography ==
Year	Film	Role	Notes
2002	Murder	TV journalist	TV film
2003	Canterbury Tales	Her	TV mini-series (1 episode: "The Miller's Tale")
2004	Piccadilly Jim	Understairs Woman	
2004	Frances Tuesday	Louise	TV film (uncredited)
2004	North and South	Ann Latimer	TV mini-series (3 episodes)
2005	Peter Warlock: Some Little Joy	Barbara Peache	TV film
2005	Malice Aforethought	Ivy Ridgeway	TV film
2005	Whatever Love Means	Georgina	TV film
2006	Minotaur	Didi	
2006	Sharpe's Challenge	Celia Burroughs	TV film
2007-09; 2011	Primeval	Claudia Brown / Jenny Lewis	TV series (Main role; 19 episodes)
2008	Harley Street	Maya	TV series (1 episode: "Episode No.1.3")
2009	The Philanthropist	Deborah Rougeaux	TV series (1 episode: "Myanmar")
2009	Midsomer Murders	Helen Markham	TV series (1 episode: "The Glitch")
2010	Frost Giant	Sedna	TV film
2010	Bonded by Blood	Anna Richards	
2011	New Tricks	Marie Braden	TV series (1 episode: "Old Fossils")
2013	Neil Jackson: Rocket to Mars	Woman	short
2013	This is Vanity	Angela	short
2014	Wireless	Unit White (voice)	TV series short
2014	The Village	Harriet Kilmartin	TV series (4 episodes)
2017	Bitter Harvest	Olena	
2024	Emmerdale	Maria	1 episode (E10168)
