= Mutual Friends (TV series) =

- Genre: Comedy drama
- Written by: Anil Gupta; Richard Pinto
- Directed by: Catherine Morshead; Jim O'Hanlon
- Starring: Marc Warren; Alexander Armstrong; Keeley Hawes; Sarah Alexander; Claire Rushbrook; Emily Joyce; Naomi Bentley
- Composer: Ben Bartlett
- Country of origin: United Kingdom
- Original language: English
- No. of series: 1
- No. of episodes: 6

Production
- Executive producer: Mark Redhead
- Producer: Rob Bullock
- Production locations: Henley-on-Thames, Oxfordshire, England, UK
- Running time: 57 mins
- Production company: Hat Trick Productions

Original release
- Network: BBC One
- Release: 26 August – 30 September 2008

Mutual Friends is a British comedy drama television series broadcast in six episodes on BBC One in from 26 August until 30 September 2008. The series starred Marc Warren, Alexander Armstrong, Keeley Hawes, Sarah Alexander, Claire Rushbrook, Emily Joyce, Naomi Bentley and Joshua Sarphie as a group of old friends whose lives are thrown into chaos when one of their group commits suicide.

== Synopsis ==
Marc Warren depicts a terminally useless solicitor Martin, whose life as a lawyer, husband to Jen (Keeley Hawes) and father to Dan (Joshua Sarphie) is thrown into turmoil as a consequence of his friends' various mid-life crises, starting with the suicide of his best friend Karl, who was guilt-ridden following his affair with Jen. Martin's other best friend, the suave, unreliable chancer Patrick (Alexander Armstrong), throws the situation into more chaos.

== Cast ==
- Marc Warren as Martin Grantham - 6 episodes
- Keeley Hawes as Jen Grantham - 6 episodes
- Alexander Armstrong as Patrick Turner - 6 episodes
- Claire Rushbrook as Leigh Cato - 6 episodes
- Joshua Sarphie as Dan Grantham - 6 episodes
- Sarah Alexander as Liz - 6 episodes
- Rhashan Stone as Dev - 6 episodes
- Naomi Bentley as Anita - 6 episodes
- Lee Ross as Harry Seed - 6 episodes
- Emily Joyce as Sarah - 6 episodes
- Alistair Petrie as Carl Cato - 4 episodes
- Thomas Byrne as Conor Cato - 4 episodes
- Patric Knowles as James - 3 episodes
- Ruben Crow as Tom - 2 episodes
- Paul Thornley as Darren - 2 episodes
- Karen Paullada as Policewoman - 2 episodes

== Episodes ==
Season 1
No. Overall	No. in Season	Original Air Date
1	1	26 August 2008
The suicide of Karl causes a chain reaction which puts Martin's marriage at risk after Martin finds out a secret about his wife and Carl. Martin's old friend Patrick returns to town to help Martin out but ends up causing more trouble.
2	2	2 September 2008
Patrick tries to help Martin get back into shape by taking him to play all different sports. Jen applies for a job in Norwich she sees this as her chance to start over. Carl's widow goes bankrupt because Carl had a secret second mortgage.
3	3	9 September 2008
When Martin is discharged from hospital he goes to make up with Jen but gets annoyed when she refuses to have sex with him. Leigh's house is repossessed so Jen asks Leigh and her three sons to stay with her which annoys Martin even further.Patrick tries to launch a clothing company.
4	4	16 September 2008
Patrick decides to split up with Sarah only to find out that she is 'late'. Leigh moves into her new council house but is unhappy about Dev's unwanted attentions. Martin thinks he will be made a partner in his law firm. Liz and Patrick's former business partner and rival, Harry, announce their engagement.
5	5	23 September 2008
Martin volunteers to teach reading at Dan's school although he is unhappy about this. Patrick talks Martin into taking on his case against Harry over the ownership of Qcumba. Liz starts having doubts about her real feelings for Harry. When the Qcumba case comes to court, Patrick loses and he returns to Qcumba to clear his desk to find that Martin is now working for Harry.
6	6	30 September 2008
Martin is now Harry's dogsbody and even has to stand-in as best man. Patrick comes to the hotel and runs up a massive bill on Harry's account. Martin's schoolboy crush, Ally, is one of the wedding guests and she is now divorced. Patrick vows to tell Liz his feelings. He and Martin have problems getting to the wedding on time.

== Production ==
Most of the show was filmed in Henley. Filming for the court scene in episode two was filmed in Bracknell in the summer of 2008 at Bracknell's police station.

The series was not recommissioned by the BBC due to low ratings. Anil Gupta also attributed the demise of the series to the departure of Peter Fincham, the controller of BBC One, in 2008.

== Reception ==
The series was nominated for Best TV Comedy Drama at the British Comedy Awards 2008.

== DVD release ==
The series has been released on a two-disc DVD set by 2 Entertain.
