= Naomi Bentley =

British actress

Naomi Bentley (born 1981) is an English actress known for her roles in Miranda, White Van Man, Primeval, Grownups, Dalziel and Pascoe and Casanova.

== Acting career ==
Bentley graduated from a three-year acting course at the Webber Douglas Academy of Dramatic Art in 2004 and has since been in demand for film, theatre and TV roles.

She made her 2004 TV debut in an episode of Holby City, followed by an appearance in Blue Murder, in which she played a receptionist. Other early appearances included a leading role in the drama Burn at the National Theatre, playing Martha in Martha Loves Michael at the Edinburgh Fringe and the role of Leah in Beautiful Thing at the Sound Theatre.

Bentley's other TV and film roles since 2004 have included WPC Maria Jackson in Dalziel and Pascoe, Leonilda in Casanova, Rachel in Grownups and Shelley in the Channel 4 film The Mark of Cain. The second series of Primeval, in which Bentley played a leading role, was shown on ITV in March and April 2008.

She starred in new BBC One comedy drama Mutual Friends alongside Marc Warren, Keeley Hawes, Sarah Alexander and Alexander Armstrong. She also played medical student Holly Farr in Silent Witness in 2008.

She appeared as Mina in the Jonathan Creek 2009 Christmas Special. She appeared alongside Joel Fry in both the BBC3 comedy series White Van Man and ITV2 comedy series Plebs. In January 2013 she played Rose in Miranda and also in 2013 she appeared in the ITV1 comedy drama series Great Night Out as Colleen.

== Personal life ==
In 2026, Bentley shared that she had Emotionally Unstable Personality Disorder also known as Borderline Personality Disorder and she suffers with clinical Depression. She also shared that she was a mother.

== Filmography ==
Film
Year	Title	Role	Notes
2005	Can You Take It?	Dawn	Short
2006	2 January	Zoe	
2007	The Mark of Cain	Shelley	
2007	Under One Roof	Various	Television film
2009	Mid Life Christmas	Deirdre Gumbarton	Television film

Television
Year	Title	Role	Notes
2004	Holby City	Steph Holland	One episode
2004	Blue Murder	Receptionist	"Hit and Run" (series 2: episode 1)
2005	Casanova	Leonilda	TV mini-series, One episode
2005–2006	Dalziel and Pascoe	WPC Maria 'Janet' Jackson	10 episodes
2006	Doctors	Zoe Taylor	One episode
2006	Snuff Box	Beautiful woman	One episode
2006	Extras	Linda	"David Bowie" (series 2: episode 2)
2006	Goldplated	Naomi Greengrass	Eight episodes
2007	Rush Hour	Jogger, Ian's PA	
2007	Grownups	Rachel	Six episodes
2007–2011	Ideal	Rainbow	13 episodes
2008	Primeval	Caroline Steel	TV series (7 episodes)
2008	Mutual Friends	Anita	Six episodes
2008	Silent Witness	Holly Farr	Two episodes
2009	Jonathan Creek	Mina	(26) "The Grinning Man"
2009	New Tricks	Alice Hill	S06E05 "Death of a Timeshare Salesman"
2010	Vexed	Lauren Roberts	One episode
2010–2011	My Family	Sasha	"He's Just Not That Into Ben" (series 10: episode 5) "A Night Out" (Series 11: episode 11)
2011	Casualty	Annie McLean	Four episodes
2011–2012	White Van Man	Liz	13 episodes
2012	Love Life	Alex	Two episodes
2012	Vera	Laura Deverson	One episode
2012	The Poison Tree	Dawn	Two episodes
2013	Miranda	Rose	Three episodes
2013	Great Night Out	Colleen	Six episodes
2013	Plebs	Lucretia	One episode
2014	Mount Pleasant	Angie	
