= List of Primeval characters =

The main characters of Primeval (Series 5) (l-r) Captain Becker, Jess Parker, Matt Anderson, Abby Maitland and Connor Temple

This is a list of characters in the ITV science fiction television series Primeval, including supporting characters.

The series originally features a cast of five main characters plus supporting cast who investigate time anomalies for the British government. The series 1 cast is made up of Douglas Henshall as Professor Nick Cutter, James Murray as Stephen Hart, Andrew-Lee Potts as Connor Temple, Lucy Brown as Claudia Brown and Hannah Spearritt as Abby Maitland, with Juliet Aubrey as Helen Cutter, Ben Miller as James Lester and Mark Wakeling as Captain Tom Ryan.

In the final episode of Series 1, Captain Tom Ryan is killed off, and Claudia Brown disappears. The rest of the cast carries over into Series 2. Lucy Brown plays a new character, Jenny Lewis, a savvy PR person and a doppelgänger of Claudia, but unlike her, she has no romantic attachment to Cutter and resents him referring to her as "Claudia". Karl Theobald as Oliver Leek, Naomi Bentley as Caroline Steel and Tim Faraday as "The Cleaner" support.

Stephen Hart and Oliver Leek are killed off in the final episode of Series 2, and Caroline Steel leaves. Series 3 sees the introduction of Laila Rouass as Sarah Page, Ben Mansfield as Captain Becker and Jason Flemyng as Danny Quinn. In the third episode Nick Cutter is killed, with Danny Quinn replacing him as team leader. Jenny Lewis leaves two episodes later (returning for the penultimate episode of Series 4); and in the finale of Series 3, Helen Cutter is knocked off a cliff by a Raptor.

Sarah Page was killed offscreen prior to Series 4, and Danny Quinn returned only in the finale of Series 4. Joining the cast was Ciarán McMenamin as Matt Anderson, the new team leader, Ruth Kearney as Jess Parker, team coordinator, Alexander Siddig as Philip Burton, an industrialist who is put in charge of the ARC, Anton Lesser as Gideon, Ruth Bradley as Emily Merchant and Jonathyn Byrne as Ethan Dobrowski.

The Series 4 line-up returned for Series 5 with the exception of Gideon and Ethan Dobrowski. They were joined by Janice Byrne as April Leonard, Philip Burton's assistant. At the end of Series 5, the only original cast members remaining were Andrew-Lee Potts, Hannah Spearritt and Ben Miller.

== Character appearances ==
Character	Actor	Appearances	Primeval					New World
Character	Actor	Appearances	1	2	3	4	5	1
Main
Nick Cutter	Douglas Henshall	16	Main	Main	Main			
Stephen Hart	James Murray	13	Main	Main				
Connor Temple	Andrew-Lee Potts	38	Main	Main	Main	Main	Main	Guest
Abby Maitland	Hannah Spearritt	36	Main	Main	Main	Main	Main	
Claudia Brown	Lucy Brown	6	Main					
Jenny Lewis	Lucy Brown	13		Main	Main	Guest		
Helen Cutter	Juliet Aubrey	17	Main	Main	Main			
Captain Tom Ryan	Mark Wakeling	6	Main					
James Lester	Ben Miller	28	Main	Main	Main	Main	Main	
Oliver Leek	Karl Theobald	7		Main				
Sarah Page	Laila Rouass	10			Main			
Captain Hilary Becker	Ben Mansfield	21			Main	Main	Main	
Danny Quinn	Jason Flemying	9			Main	Guest		
Christine Johnson	Belinda Stewart-Wilson	6			Main			
Matt Anderson	Ciarán McMenamin	13				Main	Main	
Jess Parker	Ruth Kearney	13				Main	Main	
Philip Burton	Alexander Siddig	10				Main	Main	
Emily Merchant	Ruth Bradley	9				Recurring	Main	
Evan Cross	Niall Matter	13						Main
Dylan Weir	Sara Canning	13						Main
Mac Rendell	Danny Rahim	12						Main
Toby Nance	Crystal Lowe	11						Main
Lieutenant Ken Leeds	Geoff Gustafson	10						Main
Angelika Finch	Miranda Frigon	10						Main
Recurring
Tom	Jake Curran	3	Recurring					
Duncan	James Bradshaw	4	Recurring			Guest		
'Cleaner'/Cleaner Clones	Tim Faraday	8		Recurring	Recurring			
Caroline Steel	Naomi Bentley	6		Recurring				
Mick Harper	Ramon Tikaram	3		Guest	Recurring			
Katherine Kavanagh	Ruth Gemmell	2			Recurring			
Jack Maitland	Robert Daniel Lowe	4			Recurring			
Captain Joseph Wilder	Alex McSweeney	4			Recurring			
Gideon Anderson	Anton Lesser	5				Recurring		
Patrick Quinn/ Ethan Dobrowski	Jack Bence	6			Guest			
Patrick Quinn/ Ethan Dobrowski	Johnathyn Byrne	6				Recurring		
April Leonard	Janice Byrne	4					Recurring	
Detective Harlow	Adrian Holmes	3						Recurring
Samantha Sedaris	Jodi Balfour	2						Recurring
Colonel Henderson Hall	Louis Ferreira	3						Recurring

=== Character Appearances ===
Character name	Actor	First appearance	Last appearance
Nick Cutter	Douglas Henshall	1.1	3.3
Stephen Hart	James Murray	1.1	2.7
Helen Cutter	Juliet Aubrey	1.1	3.10
Connor Temple	Andrew Lee Potts	1.1	5.6
Abby Maitland	Hannah Spearritt	1.1	5.6
Claudia Brown	Lucy Brown	1.1	1.6
James Lester	Ben Miller	1.1	5.6
Captain Tom Ryan	Mark Wakeling	1.1	1.6
Tom	Jake Curran	1.2	1.4
Duncan	James Bradshaw	1.2	4.2
Oliver Leek	Karl Theobald	2.1	2.7
Jenny Lewis	Lucy Brown	2.1	4.6
The Cleaner	Tim Faraday	2.1	3.3
Caroline Steel	Naomi Bentley	2.2	2.7
Mick Harper	Ramon Tikaram	2.6	3.4
Captain Hilary Becker	Ben Mansfield	3.1	5.6
Sarah Page	Laila Rouass	3.1	3.10
Christine Johnson	Belinda Stewart-Wilson	3.1	3.9
Danny Quinn	Jason Flemyng	3.2	4.7
Katherine Kavanagh	Ruth Gemmell	3.3	3.4
Captain Wilder	Alex McSweeney	3.4	3.9
Jack Maitland	Robert Daniel Lowe	3.4	3.8
Matt Anderson	Ciarán McMenamin	4.1	5.6
Jess Parker	Ruth Kearney	4.1	5.6
Philip Burton	Alexander Siddig	4.1	5.6
Gideon	Anton Lesser	4.1	4.6
Emily Merchant	Ruth Bradley	4.3	5.6
Ethan Dobrowski	Jonathyn Byrne	4.3	4.7
April Leonard	Janice Byrne	5.1	5.5

== A ==
=== Matt Anderson ===
Matthew Anderson
- First appearance: Episode 4.1
- Last appearance: Episode 5.6
- Portrayed by: Ciarán McMenamin

In-universe information
- Gender: Male
- Occupation: Team Leader
- Relatives: Gideon (father, deceased)
- Nationality: Irish (possible in the future)

Matthew "Matt" Anderson is portrayed by Ciarán McMenamin. He is a private man who guards the secrets of his past and the reason he has joined the ARC team. He is an ex-soldier and a zoologist, and can understand animal behaviour, demonstrating this ability in his first appearance by securing the escaped Dracorex inside of James Lester's (Ben Miller) office by luring it with a water dispenser, as the dinosaur was thirsty.

He and Captain Becker (Ben Mansfield) get along well enough, but neither misses the opportunity to make remarks of the other. In episode 4.2, Matt is unsure of Abby Maitland (Hannah Spearritt) and Connor Temple (Andrew-Lee Potts) when they first return, and follows Abby out of suspicion, but this brings him to save both of their lives from a Kaprosuchus before he comes to accept them. In episode 4.3, a mysterious woman goes through an Anomaly, Matt went after her because he assumed she was from the present, but upon returning he learnt that Emily Merchant (Ruth Bradley) was from the Victorian era and had been living with other people throughout time. He was sympathetic towards her and kept her in his flat because he believed the ARC would treat her like a criminal and agrees to help her find her companion Ethan Dobrowski (Jonathan Byrne). But while he is dealing with another Anomaly she is kidnapped by Ethan so he goes to Lester, who helps him track her down and saves her life when she was trapped inside a coffin. In episode 4.6 he takes Emily to the anomaly site and admits to her that a disaster is going to happen because of the anomalies. He later saw Gideon (Anton Lesser), who was on the verge of death, and promised to use Emily as bait to catch Ethan since they suspected he was involved. As he died Matt wept and told Emily that Gideon was his father. In episode 4.7, he realises Ethan, in fact Danny Quinn's (Jason Flemyng) brother Patrick, is not involved as he and Gideon suspected. In the end he tells Emily that he is from the future, explaining that in his time everyone lives underground because the Earth is sterile and cannot support life. He and his father, Gideon, were sent back in time to help prevent that future from happening. At some point between the present time and Matt's time, an "event" happened which changed the way Anomalies appear and their effect on the Earth, making it a barren wasteland. At the end of the episode, he convinces Emily to return to 1867 so that he can focus on stopping "the event".

In episode 5.1, he is caught by Abby trying to hack into Connor's computer to find out what he and Philip Burton (Alexander Siddig) are up to. After showing his knowledge of the Giant Burrowing Insects from the future, Abby realised he was from the future and he asked for her to help in his mission. In episode 5.3, he goes to Victorian London to capture a raptor they sent through the anomaly, telling Abby to steal data from Connor in the meantime, and encounters Emily again. Having earlier learned that she would end up in an asylum because of her husband Henry, he attempted to convince her to come back to the present as he regretted telling her to go, and was thankful to Abby when she handed over a copy of Connor's hard drive. He was not happy when Connor opened his own anomaly in the ARC during episode 5.4, and worked with Connor to eradicate a swarm of future beetles. In episode 5.5 he explains his mission to the whole team, and after bringing down a Tyrannosaurus he heads to New Dawn to stop Philip, only to be restrained as Philip activated his anomaly. In episode 5.6 he rescues Connor from the future, and risks himself to close the anomaly. He somehow manages to survive the implosion and returns to the ARC. However he is confronted by another version of himself who tells him to return to his home.

== B ==
=== Captain Becker ===
Captain Hilary Becker
- First appearance: Episode 3.1
- Last appearance: Episode 5.6
- Portrayed by: Ben Mansfield

In-universe information
- Gender: Male
- Occupation: Special Operations Captain

Captain Hilary Becker is portrayed by Ben Mansfield. Prior to introduction, producer Tim Haines made a statement about the character. "He is going to be a new military guy who comes onto the team to watch their backs so that none of them gets eaten". Becker hails from a military family and background, and is moved from special operations to the Primeval team. Mansfield himself stated that Becker would have "amiable friction" with Connor Temple (Andrew-Lee Potts) and he sees himself as the person who "looks after" the team.

James Lester (Ben Miller) assigned him to join the team in episode 3.1. Becker assisted the team in returning creatures, such as the Pristichampsus and Diictodon, back home, and began to become more involved in the action when a Giganotosaurus and a fungus from the future appeared. He often questioned Danny Quinn's (Jason Flemyng) judgement, but was nevertheless loyal and obeys orders, even if he disagrees with them. In episode 3.6 he appeared to be working with Christine Johnson (Belinda Stewart-Wilson) after she took control of the ARC from Lester, but this was later revealed to be a ploy between him and Lester to bring Johnson down. He helped Abby Maitland (Hannah Spearritt) rescue the Dracorex in episode 3.7, and accompanied the team into the future in episode 3.8 (almost dying in a fight against a pack of Future Predators) in order to keep them safe. In episode 3.10 he and Sarah Page (Laila Rouass) fought the Megopteran in the present day, and as a result was one of only three main cast members to be in the present at the end of Series 3 (the others being Sarah and Lester).

At the beginning of Series 4, Becker is still working for the ARC, despite wishing to resign before Lester convinced him to stay. It is shown in a prologue webisode that Becker went with Sarah to the future to try to find Abby, Connor and Danny, during which Sarah was killed. This has left Becker shaken, feeling that Sarah's death was his fault. He did not get along with Matt Anderson (Ciarán McMenamin) at first but slowly came to accept him. He is friendly with Jess Parker (Ruth Kearney), but is unaware she has feelings for him. After having one of Matt's EMD weapons used on him to test their capabilities, Becker agrees to use them. He is greatly relieved when Abby and Connor return, jokingly asking if they bought him a souvenir. In episode 4.3, he is adamant about enforcing the new policy to not allow any expeditions through the anomaly when Matt is missing and finally relents, but blames him when "tree creepers" cause trouble later. In episode 4.4, he is bitten by a Therocephalian and poisoned by its venom, but recovers and is forced to go on medical leave. In episode 4.6 he searches for the psychopath Ethan Dobrowski (Jonathan Byrne) who is causing problems for the ARC and gets caught in a trap rigged up to a bomb, but Jess saves him. In episode 4.7 he attempts to stop Ethan (Danny's brother Patrick) but is shot twice by an EMD, with his fate unrevealed.

In episode 5.1, it is shown that Becker did recover, and at one point was thrilled at the idea of being able to call in a tank if necessary. He allows Matt to go through an anomaly after accidentally sending a raptor to Victorian London, citing they had to make it right in episode 5.3. During episode 5.4 his fondness for Jess is more clearly shown when she has an allergic reaction to a future beetle bite and desperately tried to help her. He risked himself to radiation from a gamma ray after the beetles were killed, and though he found Jess some adrenaline, he made an excuse to leave. In the next episode he helped the rest of the ARC deal with several anomaly incursions, though he was cut off at his last one. In the series finale he joins the others in trying to stop Philip Burton's (Alexander Siddig) anomaly.

Mansfield was spotted for the role when auditioning for the future BBC series Merlin, the casting director (who also works as the casting director for Primeval) suggested that he come along to audition for Captain Becker.

=== Claudia Brown ===
Claudia Brown
- First appearance: Episode 1.1
- Last appearance: Episode 1.6
- Portrayed by: Lucy Brown

In-universe information
- Gender: Female
- Occupation: Home Office official

Claudia Brown is played by Lucy Brown. According to the official Primeval website, Claudia Brown (born in Oxford) joined the Civil Service after studying law at university. For two years, she was engaged to be married, but she broke it off a month before the wedding. She has had no significant relationships since. She later develops feelings for Nick Cutter (Douglas Henshall).

Much like James Lester (Ben Miller), her official role at the Home Office is unclear. Since the discovery of the first anomaly, she has worked alongside Cutter and his team, acting as a liaison with the Home Office and occasionally defending Cutter's actions to Lester, and vice versa, but is often stressed out by Cutter's methods and secrets. She is not happy when she learns Cutter's missing wife Helen (Juliet Aubrey) is alive and that he knew, since she could give them vital information. Claudia is in love with Cutter with whom she shares a passionate kiss during episode 1.5. In episode 1.6, Claudia jokingly accuses Cutter of sexual harassment, noting that it is a serious offence in the civil service. She began hallucinating, seeing anomalies and Inostrancevia throughout the Home Office, foreshadowing her fate.

When Cutter and Helen started to leave, she asked him not to go as she thought it was a mistake, but he assured her that it would be okay. She and Cutter then exchanged another kiss in front of Helen and the rest of the team, and rebuffed Lester's note of it being unprofessional. When Cutter returns from the past via an anomaly, Claudia has vanished and none of his colleagues have any knowledge of who she is or was, leading Cutter to believe that something he has done in the past has changed the present, erasing Claudia's existence. The reason for her disappearance is not yet known, though probably due to the remaining two baby Future Predators that managed to escape the Inostrancevia in the Permian. Cutter is devastated by this, describing Claudia to co-worker Abby Maitland (Hannah Spearritt) as "important to him" and saying he cared about her. Her non-existence shakes his foundation to the core as she is the first woman he had loved in his life since the disappearance of his wife, Helen.

Claudia remained out of existence for the second series, although another woman who appears to be physically identical, Jenny Lewis, first appears in episode 2.1. At the end of episode 2.2, Cutter explains to Jenny as best he can about what could have happened to change the past. Claudia's job as Lester's assistant was changed to a man named Oliver Leek (Karl Theobald), who was revealed to be working with Helen. It was implied that Helen was responsible for Claudia being replaced by Jenny, however Helen denies it. At the end of the finale, Cutter shreds Claudia's picture (although in Series 3 it is revealed that he repaired part of it). The writers alluded to Claudia's possible return in the future, but said that they had no plans at the time to rewrite Claudia into the timeline.

=== Philip Burton ===
Philip Burton
- First appearance: Episode 4.1
- Last appearance: Episode 5.6
- Portrayed by: Alexander Siddig

In-universe information
- Gender: Male
- Occupation: CEO, scientist

Philip Burton is portrayed by Alexander Siddig. As a result of the last mission of the old ARC, he appears in a new public/private partnership with the government, making him James Lester's (Ben Miller) boss after the minister. His company, Prospero Industries, is used as the new location for the new ARC. Philip is more interested in the Anomalies than the creatures. There is a secret project he is working on called New Dawn.

Neither Lester, Abby Maitland (Hannah Spearritt) nor Matt Anderson (Ciarán McMenamin) trusts him, but Connor Temple (Andrew-Lee Potts) admits he is like a groupie to Philip. In episode 4.1, he debriefs Abby and Connor when they return and tells them they no longer have field positions, but in the next episode Lester rehires them despite his objections. In episode 4.3, he has Connor do minor work in the ARC to spite him after he was placed back on the team, but is thankful when Connor saves him from dying and sees his true potential. In episode 4.4, he attempts to have the creatures in the ARC killed because of their inconvenience, but Lester blackmails him into dropping the matter. In episode 4.5, he recruits Connor to head up his own team of anomaly researchers after they discover vital new data. In episode 4.7, Danny Quinn (Jason Flemyng) confronts Philip about knowing Helen Cutter (Juliet Aubrey) and doing research with her after finding his name on a document on her body, and despite denying this all he is clearly agitated. Connor later tells Philip about a potential disaster to be caused by the anomalies; Philip assures him they will solve the issue themselves and do not need to tell the others.

In episode 5.1, he shows Connor his project "New Dawn", with which he plans to use the anomalies as an energy source to provide the whole world with free, clean energy. He also gives Connor a lab assistant, April Leonard (Janice Byrne). He also told Connor about Danny's knowledge of him and Helen, though he convinced him that she only knew of Philip. In episode 5.4, he witnesses Connor's man-made anomaly and Prospero gains much information from it. He was prepared to sacrifice the lives of the team to keep "New Dawn" from being compromised by blowing up the ARC during a future beetle incursion, though this fails, and it was shown he had built a larger version of Connor's device. In episode 5.5, he abandons Connor when their car is attacked by a Kaprosuchus, and activates the "New Dawn" machine, creating a huge anomaly, ignoring Matt's desperate protests. In episode 5.6, the anomaly becomes unstable and he realises that Matt was right and that it is a threat to humanity, with Helen having tricked him into it. He sacrifices himself in an attempt to destroy the "New Dawn" installation, but the anomaly became self-sustaining and remained.

== C ==
=== The Cleaner ===
Unknown
- First appearance: Episode 2.1
- Last appearance: Episode 3.3
- Portrayed by: Tim Faraday

In-universe information
- Gender: Male
- Occupation: Undercover mercenary
- Relatives: Numerous clones

"The Cleaner" is an experienced mercenary and the clones of him, who were portrayed by Tim Faraday.

He is introduced in episode 2.1, under-cover as a cleaner in a mall, who was sliced in the neck by a baby raptor. He later mysteriously disappears. Later in episode 2.2, Connor Temple (Andrew-Lee Potts) sees him as a soldier at the ARC, the scars from the raptor attack still visible. The mysterious cleaner is seen again by Nick Cutter (Douglas Henshall) in episode 2.4. Suspicious, he chases him, but is punched in the face by him, knocking him out. Later it is revealed that the man is working for Oliver Leek (Karl Theobald), who wants the team spied on – and Leek is working in cahoots with Helen Cutter (Juliet Aubrey). Many fans believed that the Cleaner's real name (or at least his surname) was Sciswell, due to mishearing part of Leek's conversation with Helen: "I have a lot riding on this as well." In episode 2.5, he goes into an anomaly with two soldiers. When one of them protests about leaving a girl behind, the man responds, "We're not social workers. Let someone else save her!". A callback to a similar line spoken by Captain Tom Ryan (Mark Wakeling) in episode 1.6 before his death, which aside from being a neat reference, does nothing to link the characters. He travels through an anomaly into the Silurian where his team is attacked and killed by giant scorpions. Only he survives, injured, and left only with a gun. He finds Cutter, demanding him to hand over his water supplies, but is then attacked by another scorpion, because of the vibrations in the sand created when he fired his weapon, he is dragged down into the sand, with his last words being, "I'm a professional. I don't talk. Ever...!" As an answer to Cutter's questioning on the subject of his employer, following this, he dies.

However, at the end of episode 2.7 many clones of him appear with Helen at Stephen Hart's (James Murray) grave. These clones would be revealed as the result of technology that Helen acquired from the future, though they lack any real independent thought like the original and are programmed to obey her every command even if it meant killing themselves. The clones re-appear in Series 3 and make an appearance at the conclusion of episode 3.1. One clone is killed in episode 3.2 while spying inside the ARC. Another dies when Helen orders him to jump off the roof of a tall building to test the clones' programmed loyalty, and many clones are killed when the ARC explodes.

=== Helen Cutter ===
Helen Cutter
- First appearance: Episode 1.1
- Last appearance: Episode 3.10
- Portrayed by: Juliet Aubrey

In-universe information
- Gender: Female
- Title: Professor
- Occupation: Professor of at Central Metropolitan University
- Spouses: Nick Cutter (estranged and deceased husband)

Professor Helen Cutter is played by Juliet Aubrey. It is all but confirmed that she was responsible for a string of anomalies in time and space through which both futuristic and powerful, prehistoric and extinct animals passed. At the very least, by the end of the series it had been made abundantly clear that she possessed a keen understanding of the mechanics of the space-time phenomena, which exceeded that of any other character in the series, which gave her the know-how to manipulate the anomalies for her own various reasons, and purposes, such as traveling through the anomalies with Cutter, which would be basic time travel, to recreating the temporal accident that replaced Claudia Brown with Jenny Lewis, and created Oliver Leek, scientific research that had the implied chance of destroying the universe, then using it to actively seek to change the timeline to prevent the bad future of Future Bats and Future Ants created by the Home Office after a successful takeover of the Anomaly Research Center in Series 3, an event in the normal timeline that failed, and between seasons obtaining cloning technology to create clones.

Before her disappearance, Helen had an affair with her student, a young man named Stephen Hart (James Murray), Nick Cutter's (Douglas Henshall) best friend and right-hand man. After being chased through an anomaly eight years before the main events of the series were put into motion, she used her disappearance to lead her estranged husband, Cutter, to believe she was dead. She possesses knowledge of what lies on the other sides of each anomaly, but chooses not to divulge key information; however, for some reason she chooses to save the life of Claudia Brown when her life is threatened by an attack by piranha-like Anurognathus. Helen refusing to divulge information into why the anomalies form, to the Home Office, places her as the focus of attention in series 1's storyline. Cutter, her estranged husband, also had a personal wish for her to return, and for her to stop escaping. She also seemed to disapprove of her husband's budding relationship with Claudia Brown (Lucy Brown), and it is hinted she may have had a hand in Claudia's disappearance.

At the end of episode 2.4, Helen is shown directing the team that is spying on the ARC members. During episode 2.5, Helen visits Stephen again and imparts some information about the group spying on the ARC members, but states it in a way to make it sound like Cutter is involved and Lester is in charge. In episode 2.6 Helen starts showing her feelings about Stephen and they share a passionate kiss and is revealed to be working with Oliver Leek (Karl Theobald) in attempting to experiment on the anomalies to see how they affect the future. In episode 2.7, she eavesdrops on a conversation in Cutter's cell to Jenny Lewis (Lucy Brown) about how Cutter still cared for Helen. Although this is later revealed to be a ploy on Cutter's part, Helen still believes that he does care for her. She was aware of Claudia in the time before the change and denies being behind it. Despite being shown as the brains of the operation, Leek begins to challenge Helen and when their creatures are released, she calls Stephen and lies to him saying that she was kidnapped by James Lester (Ben Miller) and that Cutter was killed. She asked Stephen to rescue her and not to trust Lester. When Stephen arrives, she attempts to convince him to leave into the Anomalies until it is safe but he is determined for revenge. He encounters Cutter and learns that Helen lied to him. Stephen, Helen and Cutter work to contain the predators contained in Leek's base by luring them into the centre where the cages are located by ringing the bell that they associated with feeding time, to trap the creatures together so they will kill each other but Stephen is killed. Helen appears at Stephen's gravesite shortly after his funeral and states that the timeline can change, at which point several clones of "The Cleaner" (Tim Faraday) appear, the result of her obtaining future cloning technology to create loyal minions.

In episode 3.1 she is seen in a future time period stealing an artefact from Christine Johnson's (Belinda Stewart-Wilson) military force and barely escapes with her life as predators are in the building. At the conclusion of the episode, Helen sets up an operational headquarters in the present day, assisted by the clones. In episode 3.3, after taking the ARC with her clones, she attempts to explain herself to Cutter that she can prevent future atrocities (such as the rise of the Future Predators) by actively changing timelines in the past so that evolution and history take a different path. Cutter rejects this, insisting that Helen has no right to meddle. Helen also seems to believe that Cutter's work with the ARC is in some way responsible for the atrocities she has seen in the future and thus intended to kill him in order to avoid it once he translates the artefact for her. She is caught in the blast from the bomb in the ARC and Cutter returns to rescue her only for her to shoot him and leave him to die. Donning the alias of Eve (Kate Magowan), she uses Danny Quinn (Jason Flemyng) to get into the new ARC headquarters to regain the artefact, now believing that the only means to ensure the Future Predators' timeline never occurs is by negating humanity itself. She attempts to do this in the finale of Series 3 and is responsible for the death of the so-called "First Family". She briefly confronts Danny in the Pliocene, stating that when humanity is gone, other species will be able to develop in peace with no war or pollution. Helen is killed by a raptor before she can complete her mission.

Her presence is still felt strongly in the fourth series, as the ARC team speculate her fate; when Danny returns in the finale, he confirms that Helen is dead "as a dodo" to Lester, who responds happily: "Excellent". Danny also tells Matt Anderson (Ciarán McMenamin) and Emily Merchant (Ruth Bradley) that Helen and Philip Burton (Alexander Siddig) worked together studying the anomalies, and that Burton is not to be trusted. In the fifth series, Connor Temple (Andrew-Lee Potts) discovered an audio of Helen encouraging Philip to find a way to make the future better by using the anomalies. However, in the series finale Philip realised Helen had tricked him by stroking his ego, having intended for his attempt at making green energy with the anomalies to wipe out humans much like her later plan, likely done in case she failed in her attempt to wipe out early humans.

=== Nick Cutter ===
Nick Cutter
- First appearance: Episode 1.1
- Last appearance: Episode 3.3
- Portrayed by: Douglas Henshall

In-universe information
- Gender: Male
- Title: Professor
- Occupation: Professor of Palaeozoology at Central Metropolitan University; Anomaly team member
- Spouses: Helen Cutter (estranged and deceased wife)

Professor Nick Cutter was played by Douglas Henshall. He was a Professor of Palaeozoology at the (fictional) Central Metropolitan University. He was one of a group of people who discover that prehistoric and extinct animals are passing through anomalies in time and space. Due to his expertise in prehistoric creatures, he was assigned to tackling the problems these creatures cause for the present civilisation by the Home Office, and was described as a "rank amateur who was amazingly good at what he did". Cutter is an expert in Palaeontology and the identification of extinct species. While little is known about his early life, the Official site states that he was born in Edinburgh and graduated from his year at University College London with First Class Honours. At some point he met and quickly married his wife Helen Cutter (Juliet Aubrey). Their marriage proved to be a failure, however, as according to Douglas Henshall's web site, the relationship between them became as stormy as it was passionate. They were estranged at the time of her disappearance, and this added to Cutter's sense of guilt when she vanished. When the series begins it is established that he had a wife, fellow palaeontologist Helen, who went missing eight years prior to his first encounter with a time anomaly. He tells the others that she went missing sometime after the two of them had a fight.

At first, his insistence that his wife Helen is alive in the first two and a half episodes is seen by some members of the time as initially somewhat foolish and unrealistic, most notably Claudia Brown (Lucy Brown). He then keeps the details of her visitations to himself, out of hurt pride that his wife could have left him alone for so long. This has terrible consequences later when the government found out. When the truth is known, not only does he lose the respect of Claudia but also brings the wrath of James Lester (Ben Miller) down on himself. After being tricked into leading Lester's troops to his wife the relationship between the two of them hit a new low as she is adamant that he had set her up and he finally lost patience with her evasions and riddles. She later escapes, and his motives for trying to follow her through the Anomaly are open to question.

Cutter started out as a somewhat aloof individual; for example he initially rather briskly brushes off Connor Temple (Andrew-Lee Potts) who comes to him with suspicions of a prehistoric creature being loose in modern times, telling him to go and get a girlfriend instead. He also keeps his encounter with his long lost wife, Helen, to himself. He can be quite spiteful at times as his last words to Stephen Hart (James Murray) before heading through the anomaly in episode 1.6 are to push Lester through the nastiest anomaly he can find if he does not make it back. He withholds information from his friends and teammates and Connor notes in episode 1.1 that he never turns up for his own seminars. He also tries to make demands of Lester in episode 1.3. He is ordered to bring Helen back only to be shocked when Lester overrules his decision and brings his wife back by force. Nick's attitude towards the Home Office involvement was at first one of mild contempt, at least for the more bureaucratic members such as Lester. He dislikes hiding things from the public. Helen says she thinks he wants to share the time anomalies with the rest of the world in episode 1.3.

However, Cutter is not uncompassionate, and he has mellowed out over time. He's developed a grudging respect for Lester, despite his claims to the contrary, and his caring side is shown when he reassures Connor on several occasions, most notably when Connor's friend, Tom (Jake Curran), is killed by a parasite. He was also very trusting of Helen, despite her comments and the others' suspicions that she may have intentionally set the parasitic dodos on mankind in episode 1.4, although he was angry to discover Helen's real reason for returning the baby Future Predators to their own time. After that, it's safe to assume whatever feelings he had left for her are now over. His relationship with Claudia was beginning to turn romantic, as demonstrated when he rushes to her rescue and later kisses her in episode 1.5 and she begs him not to leave her. Before heading into the anomaly, the two share a passionate kiss – much to Helen's anger. After the catastrophic mission to the Permian he returns to learn Helen and Stephen had once had an affair and that Claudia no longer exists.

Due to changes in the timeline, the cause of which is unknown, Cutter remains one of two of the only currently identified characters (the second being Helen) to remain unaffected for reasons that are unknown. Cutter himself is confused as to how this happened. Cutter also immediately calls new P.R. guru Jenny Lewis (Lucy Brown) "Claudia" after her doppelgänger. This confuses the team a lot, and while Connor and Abby Maitland (Hannah Spearritt) both show some sort of support, they find it hard to accept what he is saying. Stephen and Cutter are now both quietly cautious of one another after the revelation of the affair and are no longer in full agreement of their methods. Cutter is not happy when he learns Stephen and Helen have been seeing each other in secret and punches him, showing he still has some feelings for Helen. In the series finale he learned Helen was working with traitor Oliver Leek (Karl Theobald) on anomaly research and acts out that he still cares about Helen but instead reveals he's going to turn her over to Lester before she escapes. He frees Leek's Future Predators and when he meets up with Helen and Stephen they agree to put an end to the predators Leek's captured. He is willing to sacrifice himself to save others but he is punched by Stephen, who takes his place inside the predator-filled room. Stephen asks Cutter to tell Connor and Abby to stay out of trouble, and is then killed. Having spent some time trying to get to know Jenny and learning she has a fiancé, but it is revealed they broke up and asked Cutter out for a drink but they were called away to an anomaly. Cutter shreds the picture of Claudia Brown at the end of the episode, showing he's decided to move on.

In Series 3, Cutter begins creating a matrix to predict anomalies with the help of Sarah Page (Laila Rouass) after learning mythical beasts may be linked to anomalies and successfully predicts one. He also saw "The Cleaner" (Tim Faraday) again despite witnessing his apparent death and realises Helen's back. In episode 3.3, he helps deliver a baby while trapped in a hospital room. When they return to the ARC he learns Helen created a clone in his image to take over the ARC. He learns of her intent to change the timeline by killing him after learning he ordered the cloning of Future Predators in the ARC sometime in the future, but only once he translates the strange artefact from the future she possesses. Cutter attempts to stall her until his friends neutralise the Cleaner clones, forcing Helen to order the Cutter Clone to detonate a bomb in spite of the original's attempt to talk him out of it. Cutter attempts to save Helen as the ARC goes up in flames, hiding the artefact from her, but she shoots him in the chest after saying the future was more important than he was and ran off. Connor then attempts to save Cutter, but when he arrives, he is told to sit down and wait. As they are talking, Cutter asks Connor to tell Jenny/Claudia something but, decides against it. Giving Connor the artefact, Cutter charges him, as his dying wish, to find out what the artefact is, before dying on Connor's shoulder. Despite his death, the future did not change as Helen thought because he was not going to be the real reason the Future Predators appeared.

Douglas Henshall confirmed in TV Times that he would be leaving the show at the end of Series 3, quoting: "It was one of those things that happened and I thought, 'Oh God, I've done it. I've left', he told David Hollingsworth. "The show might miss me for five minutes, but then I think it will move on and be fine." "There's a little bit of me that thinks, 'this is my show, what do you mean they're still doing it without me," he says. "But it will be good for Primeval in the long term – it will have to reinvent itself."

== D ==
=== Ethan Dobrowski ===
Ethan Dobrowski (Patrick Quinn)
- First appearance: Episode 4.3
- Last appearance: Episode 4.7
- Portrayed by: Jonathan Byrne

In-universe information
- Gender: Male
- Relatives: Danny Quinn (brother)
- Nationality: English

Ethan Dobrowski (formerly known as Patrick Quinn) is the brother of Danny Quinn who is played by Jonathyn Byrne.

Patrick Quinn was fourteen years old when he and two of his friends broke into a house, however they were caught off guard by a Camouflage beast that had come through an anomaly, and Patrick's body was never found along with another one of his friends. Though presumed dead, and while his brother Danny (Jason Flemyng) spent years trying to find out what had happened to him, he had actually survived and gone through the anomaly to some point in the future. He is known to have killed several camouflage beasts in order to survive, and was left psychopathic by the experience. At some point he discovered another anomaly which took him to the year 1902 where he took the name Ethan Dobrowski, and people assumed he was originally from Russia. He killed six people, gaining a police record, and eventually left through another anomaly. At some point he joined a group of time travellers along with Emily Merchant (Ruth Bradley) and Charlotte Cameron. He became close to Charlotte, and she was able to calm him, as he was noticeably different from the other members of the group.

When Charlotte was sick, Ethan accompanied her and Emily to find an anomaly leading to a place with medicine, and arrived in the present, but she died. Angered over her death, Ethan blamed Emily as he believed her rules had caused them to be too late. He soon followed Emily and took up residence across from Matt Anderson's (Ciarán McMenamin) flat, and when he left Ethan kidnapped her. In episode 4.5, he had decided that as the only two to have known Charlotte, they were going to have their own funeral. He drove them to a cemetery where he told Emily he also blamed his family for what had happened to him and was going to make them suffer, and bound and gagged Emily inside a coffin before he fled from Matt. During episode 4.6, and after laying a trap for anyone who might come looking for him in the flat, went to his old home to find that a neighbour recognised him and claimed to be someone else before leaving. In episode 4.7, while attempting to leave through another anomaly, he was caught after he encountered his brother Danny, revealing to everyone that he was Patrick. Captured and taken to the ARC, he told Danny what had happened to make him disappear, but said he was unhappy in the modern era, and escaped, taking the still-alive Emily as a hostage. Before he went through an anomaly to the Pliocene he ignored Emily's attempts to get him to stop, and left her at the mercy of a terror bird. He was soon followed by Danny, who wanted to keep him from hurting anyone else.

=== Duncan ===
Duncan
- First appearance: Episode 1.2
- Last appearance: Episode 4.2
- Portrayed by: James Bradshaw

In-universe information
- Gender: Male

Duncan is a friend of Connor Temple (Andrew-Lee Potts) and Tom (Jake Curran) and a fellow geek. He also seems to enjoy conspiracy theories. Despite this he does not believe Connor when he tries to tell him and Tom what he has been involved in without breaking the Official Secrets Act, and he and Duncan devise their own conspiracy theories around the dodo (which he names Dodie) that they capture. Duncan seems to be the more mellow of Connor's friends and is quite willing to follow the more proactive Tom.

Duncan returned in episode 4.2, having gone into hiding for four years since Tom's death and finding proof of creature attacks for himself since no one believed him. He led Connor to the docks where homeless people had been going missing, and with Abby Maitland (Hannah Spearritt) they discovered the Kaprosuchus that had been living there for five years. After being chased into a maze of containers where the creature pursued him until it was killed, Connor returned him home, and asked that if he came across more creature reports that he tell him.

== G ==
=== Gideon ===
Gideon
- First appearance: Episode 4.1
- Last appearance: Episode 4.6
- Portrayed by: Anton Lesser

In-universe information
- Gender: Male
- Children: Matt Anderson

Gideon is portrayed by Anton Lesser.

Throughout the beginning of the fourth series, it is implied that he and Matt Anderson (Ciarán McMenamin) were working on a secret mission involving the ARC. He seemed desperate that they achieve their goal, warning Matt to keep an eye on the other members of the ARC and be wary of everyone, particularly Abby Maitland (Hannah Spearritt) and Connor Temple (Andrew-Lee Potts) when they returned after a year in the Cretaceous. In episode 4.3 he is revealed to be dying because of an undisclosed illness, but had accepted his fate and wanted Matt to forget about him as he wasn't important. He wasn't happy in episode 4.5 when Matt risked everything to rescue Emily Merchant (Ruth Bradley) from Ethan Dobrowski (Jonathan Byrne), and Gideon feared that Ethan was connected to their mission, and ordered Matt to use Emily as bait. By episode 4.6, he is close to death, and apologises to Matt for not allowing him to get close to anyone, as it was for everyone's own good, and before he died he asked Matt to complete their mission. Matt then revealed to Emily that Gideon was his father. In episode 4.7, it is revealed that he has travelled back in time from a sterile future Earth in order to prevent this future from happening.

== H ==
=== Mick Harper ===
Mick Harper
- First appearance: Episode 2.6
- Last appearance: Episode 3.4
- Portrayed by: Ramon Tikaram

In-universe information
- Gender: Male
- Occupation: Journalist

Mick Harper is a journalist who is played by Ramon Tikaram. He first appears in episode 2.6, trying to interview a survivor of a Columbian mammoth's rampage on the M25. Like everyone else he had been told it was an elephant, unaware that the creature was actually a mammoth. He was unable to complete the interview because Jenny Lewis (Lucy Brown) disrupted him. She used a sarcastic tone about it being a mammoth to throw him off, but Mick suspected there was more to the operation, and vowed to find out what was going on.

In episode 3.3, Mick convinced his boss, Katherine Kavanagh (Ruth Gemmell), to give him a chance to prove prehistoric creatures were alive in the present, and attempted to have Jenny tell him after tracking down her home, but she refused to comment. He followed the team to a hospital, and locked Nick Cutter (Douglas Henshall), Abby Maitland (Hannah Spearritt) and a pregnant woman in an operating theatre. He then found a Diictodon, taking a blurry picture which he showed Katherine, who thought he was playing games with her, but was allowed one last chance. In episode 3.4 Mick stole an anomaly detector from Jenny's car and presented it to Katherine as it went off, and they decided to go to the location on it with a camera crew. At the airport site they found an anomaly, and Mick locked Jenny and Connor Temple (Andrew-Lee Potts) in another hangar after tricking them into believing they were attacked elsewhere. Mick and others filmed a juvenile Velociraptor that comes through the anomaly while Nigel Marven described it to them. A Giganotosaurus came through the anomaly and attacked, and the car Mick and Katherine hid in was flipped over. Danny Quinn (Jason Flemyng) and Connor pulled them out and both were locked in the other hangar as they were under arrest. Mick agreed to force the door open once Katherine agreed to give him a fair share of the merchandising once they had broken the story. They grabbed a camera to film the crisis, and Mick quit when Danny nearly hit him with a helicopter. Katherine frantically filmed the Giganotosaurus as it was heading towards the anomaly, and inadvertently pushed Mick backwards through the anomaly, where they are presumably killed as Mick is heard screaming.

=== Stephen Hart ===
Stephen James Hart
- First appearance: Episode 1.1
- Last appearance: Episode 2.7
- Portrayed by: James Murray

In-universe information
- Gender: Male
- Occupation: Lab technician
- Children: none
- Relatives: unknown
- Nationality: English

Stephen James Hart is played by James Murray. He is part of a team of five people, who investigate a series of anomalies in space and time through which prehistoric and extinct creatures are travelling. Stephen is Nick Cutter's (Douglas Henshall) lab technician and "right-hand man". During the first series he was the object of fellow team member Abby Maitland's (Hannah Spearritt) affections. He did not return her affections.

According to the official site, Stephen is passionately committed to wildlife conservation and firmly believes that humanity is destroying its own environment through unchecked industrialisation. On average, he runs about 30 miles a week.

He remains a cold and aloof individual, but one with loyal and brave tendencies as he willingly braves the jaws of a Gorgonopsid and an Arthropleura in order to save his friends and innocent bystanders. He is also not afraid to stand up to Cutter as he confronts him about the way he withheld information about his wife, Helen Cutter (Juliet Aubrey) from them. In episode 1.2, Cutter risks his life to get an anti-venom which will save Stephen's life.

While he tries not to show any emotion and keep his personal life secret, he does ask Abby out for dinner and later admitted that he has a girlfriend although their relationship appears to have broken down and the official site states that he "had his heart broken when he fell in love as a student and never really got over it."

In the first series, Stephen seemed to act as a punchbag for the monsters, often being badly injured or stranded on his own. He also seems to have a big brother relationship with Connor Temple (Andrew-Lee Potts) whom he constantly puts down and yet looks out for at the same time. In episode 2.7, Stephen is killed by a collection of animals that Oliver Leek (Karl Theobald) had captured. He was killed preventing the animals from escaping, and his funeral was the only one in the history of the show. It is revealed that his middle name is James.

According to the official site, Stephen was once a junior fencing champion and also a junior shooting Olympic prospect. He later gave up both to study natural history. He appears to have had a long relationship with Cutter going back at least eight years as he states that he knew Helen himself; in the last episode it is revealed that he had an affair with her. Whether or not she is the former girlfriend who broke his heart is unclear but it is shown in episode 1.6 that it was a short-lived affair which he has regretted ever since, mainly because of his guilt over betraying his friend and partly because Helen is, as he calls her, "a real bitch".

When the series begins it is established that he is working alongside Cutter as a teacher and lab assistant. He later follows both Cutter and Connor and becomes ensnared with them in the sinister events unfolding in the Forest of Dean. He then reveals that he has some training as a tracker and in stealth combat, as he vanishes under Connor's nose to begin the hunt for the Gorgonopsid personally. He later tracks it to a school and is wounded trying to lure it away from a teacher and her student. Of Cutter's team members, he is the most proficient with armed weapons and is usually the one armed with the tranquiliser rifle.

When brought into the anomaly team, he is then sent to the underground vaults and bunkers beneath Parsons Green Station. He is then attacked, poisoned and left for dead by an Arthropleura while trying to find Cutter. It is during this time he is visited by Helen, although she also left him for dead, she gave him a message for her husband. He later remembers nothing of the incident, however. Subsequently, his memory returns; he confronts Cutter and is angered by his unconcern for his wife, stating that if she was his wife he would have gone looking for her. He later helps prepare Cutter for his trip into the underwater anomaly, arming him with a spear gun. He also tries to make amends with Abby for asking her out and then forgetting about it.

He once again proves his concern for her welfare when he runs to her rescue in episode 1.4 when she is captured by Connor's parasite-ridden friend. However, Claudia (Lucy Brown) – who is also angry for his running into trouble in the subway – and James Lester (Ben Miller) appear to have lost patience with him during the hunt for the Pteranodon.

Stephen appears to have undergone the least change of all the characters since the changes in the timeline, with most of his history remaining the same including his affair with Helen. Although the revelation of the affair causes more tension between them, they still remain loyal to each other as colleagues.

In the final episode, he is called by Lester to handle the threat posed by a Silurian scorpion that was unleashed on a beach resort by Leek. He managed to spear the creature and left it for the ARC (or Leek as it is hinted later that Leek's collection includes the presumed dead Smilodon from episode 2.3) to deal with after which he received a call from Helen who told him her location, telling Stephen that Cutter and the others were dead and that Lester had kidnapped her.

Stephen arrived at Leek's base only to discover that Helen had lied to him and that Cutter was alive. Despite feeling betrayed by Helen, Stephen showed anger towards Cutter as well believing that he was wrong on how he dealt with the Anomaly crisis. Stephen, Helen and Cutter tried to deal with the freed creatures by luring them into the central chamber where they were all held, luring them by ringing the bell that the creatures associated with feeding time. While doing this, a raptor, which also appeared in episode 2.1, attacked Helen which Stephen killed with his pistol but then Helen kicked the door mechanism which could only be closed from the inside. Cutter attempted to sacrifice himself but Stephen punched his mentor and entered the chamber, sealing it from the inside. The last sight of him was being killed by the assembled predators who killed each other after feasting on him. Having been relieved of his ARC duties some time earlier, and being fed disinformation by Helen, it appears that Stephen died still believing James Lester to be the traitor in the ARC (though Cutter told him that Lester was not the enemy moments before his death), and unaware of both Leek's role and fate.

His funeral was held by the members of the ARC but after they left, Helen arrived to visit the grave and stated that there was nothing to worry as there were ways to return.

== J ==
=== Christine Johnson ===
Christine Johnson
- First appearance: Episode 3.1
- Last appearance: Episode 3.9
- Portrayed by: Belinda Stewart-Wilson

In-universe information
- Gender: Female
- Occupation: Civil servant. Head of ARC for one episode [3.6]

Christine Johnson (played by Belinda Stewart-Wilson, ex-wife of Ben Miller) is the military liaison to the ARC in series three. Ostensibly, her role is to provide the assistance of the armed forces to deal with the problems caused by the anomalies. However, it is apparent she has other objectives.

In episode 3.1, she revealed her new role to James Lester (Ben Miller), both equally despising the other, and sent several soldiers through an anomaly into the future to retrieve a mysterious artefact. The mission failed, with only one soldier returning alive, and the artefact ultimately being stolen by Helen Cutter (Juliet Aubrey). In episode 3.4, it is revealed that she has her own facility, which contains an anomaly and a Future Predator which her team is running tests on. The anomaly that Christine has is normally cloaked from the ARC's Anomaly Detection Device (presumably by radio jamming on the frequency used by the detector), but the existence of the anomaly is revealed to the ARC team when the cloaking device goes offline. In episode 3.5 she visits the ARC and attempted to convince Lester to replace the deceased Nick Cutter (Douglas Henshall) with Captain Wilder (Alex McSweeney) so that she could control the ARC team, and blamed Lester when one of her men was killed by a fungus creature. She was annoyed even further when Lester led her to assume he would choose Wilder to be team leader, but instead appoints Danny Quinn (Jason Flemyng).

In episode 3.6, Christine's hidden cameras inside the ARC allowed her to learn they had the artefact, and had the Minister appoint her to be in charge of the ARC, getting rid of Lester, but the team escaped with the artefact. She is forced to leave when Captain Becker (Ben Mansfield) betrays her by recording her abusing the Minister, and Lester sent it to the Minister. She did so vowing "It's not over", mirroring Lester from earlier. However she did not give up trying to take control of the ARC, and in episode 3.8 she sent Wilder though her anomaly and he returned with a woman from the future called Eve (Kate Magowan). In episode 3.9 her attempts to get information from her were interrupted by Danny, who escaped with Eve. Christine had a warrant for Danny's arrest, the return of Eve and the custody of the artefact when she arrived at the ARC, however Eve was revealed to be Helen, who kidnapped Christine and stole the artefact. Helen revealed Christine was the cause of the destruction in the future because of her ambitions before kicking her through the anomaly in her HQ. She returns, blood-spattered and terrified, and the team attempt to save her, only for a Future Predator to stick its head through the anomaly and growl at them. This causes them to let go of Christine, and she is dragged screaming through the anomaly, which closes on her, and is presumably killed by the Future Predator.

== K ==
=== Katherine Kavanagh ===
Katherine Kavanagh appeared in episode 3.3 and episode 3.4 played by Ruth Gemmell. She is Mick Harper's (Ramon Tikaram) boss from Evening News HQ. She only gave his assistant one chance to find a Diictodon and when Mick gave the picture to her, she said "No, not really, you bring me a blurry picture of a Gopher with false comedy teeth, a child of ten could've faked that. Get out of my sight!" In episode 3.4, Mick gave her an anomaly detector and they followed it. She got out from being locked in a building and while filming, Katherine was killed with Mick by a Giganotosaurus while it followed Danny Quinn (Jason Flemyng) in a helicopter.

== L ==
=== Oliver Leek ===
Oliver Leek
- First appearance: Episode 2.1
- Last appearance: Episode 2.7
- Portrayed by: Karl Theobald

In-universe information
- Gender: Male
- Occupation: Assistant to James Lester (Claudia Brown's replacement)

Oliver Leek was the main antagonist of the second series. He is played by Karl Theobald.

Leek works for the ARC (Anomaly Research Centre) which investigates time anomalies and stops creatures of the past and future from coming through them.

When Helen (Juliet Aubrey) and Nick Cutter (Douglas Henshall) went to the Permian in episode 1.6, on their return the timeline had changed, Leek had replaced Claudia Brown (Lucy Brown) as James Lester's (Ben Miller) assistant.

According to the official Primeval website, Leek is "slightly nerdy, intelligent and eager to please". He went as far as buying suits from exactly the same tailor as Lester, a feeble attempt to impress his boss. At school Leek was overlooked and the last picked for sports. As an adult, he goes to the same restaurant every morning and eats at the same table, while the waiter still fails to recognise him. Apparently he is 33 years old, 170 cm (5 ft, 8 in) tall, and was born in Birmingham.

According to the website "There is more to Leek than meets the eye", pointing towards a sinister side of him. This sinister side is first shown in episodes 2.3 and 2.4, where he appears to be employing at least two individuals – a mysterious cleaner (Tim Faraday) and Caroline Steel (Naomi Bentley) – to follow the team and find out as much as they can. He also appears to be consorting with Helen who seems to have placed her trust in him for some objective. In episode 2.6 it is revealed that Leek is overseeing a private menagerie of animals, to establish a powerful place for himself in the future. Caroline eventually steals Rex, who is then used as bait to lure Cutter's team to Leek's secret facility.

Leek is highly adept at manipulating people, seeming very much in control in episode 2.7, and is able to use this ability to engineer situations to his own advantage. In addition, although Cutter realises early in series two that there is a traitor within the ARC, Leek manages to avoid suspicion until he chooses to reveal himself in episode 2.6, having set an elaborate trap for the team based on his knowledge of Connor Temple's (Andrew-Lee Potts) working methods. He seems to dislike taking orders, and reminds Helen that he is in charge multiple times throughout episode 2.7.

He seems to have a great disregard for other people's feelings and human lives – he finds the fight between Abby Maitland (Hannah Spearritt) and Caroline entertaining, and does not seem to care when Cutter tells him that if a predator was to escape it could wipe out mankind. He further demonstrates his lack of appreciation for human life by releasing a Silurian Scorpion into a popular beach resort and allowing it to kill two innocent men, as well as placing 12 more creatures at strategic locations and threatening to release them despite knowing full well the carnage and destruction they would cause. Lester and Connor both refer to him as a small, insignificant or irritating man because of his aloof nature.

His plan of releasing creatures to take control of mankind fails when a virus sends Lester all the information required. If Cutter had escaped with the others, then Leek would have almost certainly been arrested, but because Cutter remains, Leek still seems to think he is unstoppable. He threatens to kill Cutter using his army of Future Predators, but before he can command the predators to kill him, Cutter throws a neural clamp used to control the predators into an electric box, which short-circuits all the other clamps. Cutter escapes and shuts the door to the room. The Future Predators descend to the floor of the room and horrifically kill Leek as he screams in agony. This is witnessed via the Anomaly Detector by Lester and several of the ARC staff, though only Lester can bring himself to watch before turning to one of the staff, Lorraine Wickes, and casually asks her to switch the device off.

Although he is never seen at a computer terminal, it is apparent that Leek has considerable hacking skills, which he has used to install spyware on Connor's "anomaly detector", and to set a booby-trap which initiated the countdown on a bomb when Connor attempted to access Leek's personnel files.

=== April Leonard ===
April Leonard
- First appearance: Episode 5.1
- Last appearance: Episode 5.5
- Portrayed by: Janice Byrne

In-universe information
- Gender: Female
- Occupation: Prospero scientist

April Leonard is played by Janice Byrne, and is Connor Temple's (Andrew-Lee Potts) assistant following her appointment by Philip Burton (Alexander Siddig). When around Connor and the rest of the ARC team she wears glasses, though she does not need them.

She was first seen in episode 5.1 at the site of Philip's "New Dawn" facility, and Philip decided to have her assist Connor in helping work on "New Dawn" to create energy from the anomalies. She was later shown to be reporting to Philip on Connor's progress, as well as keeping an eye on anyone that Danny Quinn (Jason Flemyng) might have told about his connection with Helen Cutter (Juliet Aubrey). In episode 5.3, she subtly forces Connor to continue working, and later gives Abby Maitland (Hannah Spearritt) "friendly advice" about leaving Connor to finish his important work at the risk of losing him.

In episode 5.4, she assists Philip in watching their new data come in from Connor's anomaly, and convinced him to kill the people in the ARC by blowing it up during a future beetle incursion, saying that Philip's goals were worth more than them; however this did not come to pass. In episode 5.5, when the team is trying to prevent the "New Dawn" project going online, she has a confrontation with Abby, which ends when she is attacked and killed by a swarm of Anurognathus.

=== James Lester ===
James Lester
- First appearance: Episode 1.1
- Last appearance: Episode 5.6
- Portrayed by: Ben Miller

In-universe information
- Gender: Male
- Occupation: Senior UK government official
- Spouse: 1 (unnamed)
- Children: 3 (unnamed)
- Nationality: English

James Peregrine Lester is played by Ben Miller.

Lester works for the British government, and is leader and ultimately responsible for the team of scientists, led by Nick Cutter (Douglas Henshall), charged with investigating the appearance of time anomalies. A ruthless and sarcastic individual, he's been given the task of uncovering the secrets of the anomalies and preventing mass panic and he intends to do that by whatever means are necessary.

According to the official site he is without any real political allegiances although he believes that the ends justify the means and has no problems with torture. He is also hinted to be a British patriot with a distrust of the EU. – "And I thought the Common Agricultural Policy was far-fetched."

While remaining, for the most part, stubborn, paranoid, slow to face facts and wilfully ignorant, he has also displayed surprising bursts of astonishing foresight and knowledge as he guesses correctly that his assistant, Claudia Brown (Lucy Brown) has personal reasons for wanting Cutter to remain close by, and that Cutter was hiding something from them. He also guesses that Helen Cutter (Juliet Aubrey) was lying in order to escape, "I think I'd trust her just about as far as I can throw a Stegosaurus", but is convinced otherwise by Claudia and Cutter, which proves to be a mistake on their part. He's usually right in the final analysis, especially on matters of human nature, when Cutter is usually wrong.

However, he has also shown a softer side when he promises to have the charges against a young girl dropped, when Claudia brings the matter to his attention, even though he can simply do nothing. In Series 3, he allowed Connor Temple (Andrew-Lee Potts) to stay with him when Abby Maitland (Hannah Spearritt) asked him to move out of her flat when her brother Jack (Robert Lowe) needed somewhere to stay, despite showing previous dislike towards him. Like Cutter, Lester has slowly mellowed out over the course of the series and become far more active and reasonable when dealing with the team.

He is a smart dresser and owns over 50 suits, all made to measure in dark colours which he wears with coloured ties because someone once told him it was trendy. He plays squash and tennis as a hobby.

Little of Lester's background has been revealed, other than he has a family. While his exact role and position in the government is unclear, he has free run of Whitehall and command of intelligence and security forces. He has spent his entire career "planning for just about every crisis imaginable—up to and including alien invasion." He describes himself as "a trouble shooter without portfolio in the PM's office" and agreed with Cutter's assessment that he is a "government backed hatchet man."

For most episodes he remains a sedentary leader and problem-solver; everyone has to go to him at Whitehall, and he operates through agents like Claudia and Captain Tom Ryan (Mark Wakeling). However this is apparently not due to any lack of courage in the face of danger; he has no fear going out in the field and once met up with the team in order to confront Cutter personally and ensure the capture of Helen. During her later interrogation he is quite happy to use torture to gain information.

While having an intense dislike of Cutter, and believing his team members (Connor in particular) to be annoying, he remains professional except for regular sarcastic comments. Later in the series his relationship with Cutter did reach a breaking point; he questions Cutter's role in his wife's escape and the reason for his pursuit and claims he causes more problems than he solves, which is, as usual, an accurate assessment. By the end of the first series, however, he was prepared to forgive and forget and put his neck on the line for the Professor and, when push came to shove, was prepared to actively join in the effort to find a Future Predator and the anomaly it came from. Lester's middle name is Peregrine, which he keeps a closely guarded secret.

Due to changes in the timeline, the cause of which is unknown, Lester is now the agent in charge of the A.R.C. He now also has a personal assistant, Oliver Leek (Karl Theobald), who is apparently working with Helen. Connor later discovered that his new girlfriend, Caroline Steel (Naomi Bentley), is really working with Leek and Helen. In episode 2.6, Lester is trapped alone inside the ARC by Oliver Leek, who attempts to kill him using a Future Predator controlled by "neural clamp" (some kind of external control) on its spinal column. Lester foils the attempt by releasing a Columbian mammoth which is being kept safe inside the ARC, which impales the predator on its tusks. Lester later jokingly suggests keeping the mammoth as a pet for his kids, if the team were unable to find the creature a home. This is the first time Lester mentions having a family. Lester then decides to take charge of the next anomaly investigation himself; however, it turns out to be a false alarm, set up as a diversion by Leek while he lures Cutter's team to his secret facility. Lester arrives at the scene of the false alarm to find only a note reading "BAD LUCK". In the final episode, Lester shows much more support and concern for the team, and goes to the extent of calling Stephen Hart (James Murray) to try to help out. However, he is set up by Helen, and portrayed as a bad guy throughout the final episode (by Stephen and Helen's perspective). He also sides with Cutter, who seems willing to die to prevent anyone else from being killed. When Cutter destroys the neural clamps, releasing the predators from Leek's control, Lester insists on watching Leek being devoured by his former pets and seems unfazed by it as opposed to the horrified reactions of the other people watching, including his assistant Lorraine Wickes. When the death of Leek is over, he casually tells Lorraine to: "turn that off will you?". He also discovers the secret locations of Leek's menagerie, and mops them all up one by one. He also attends Stephen's funeral, but has to leave early because of a "high-priority anomaly".

In Series 3, Lester's fight becomes more personal when he discovers Christine Johnson (Belinda Stewart-Wilson) working against him, who he has connections to. In episode 3.3 he is rounded up and imprisoned with the rest of the ARC by Helen and her clones, and shows little surprise at Cutter's apparent betrayal "So, Cutter's finally gone native". When Cutter lies dying after the ARC explosion, Lester yells desperately for an ambulance for him. In the following episode he makes Jenny Lewis (Lucy Brown) team leader, and then assigns Danny Quinn (Jason Flemyng) to the same role the episode after. When he discovers Connor living in the ARC with the two Diictodon, he offers him his spare apartment, although later appears to be annoyed at the mess Connor and his "pets" make. In episode 3.6 he is stripped of command of the ARC by Christine, although with the help of Captain Becker (Ben Mansfield) he regains it later in the episode, telling Christine that she is "sitting in his chair" mirroring one of her lines earlier that episode. In episode 3.9 Lester commands Danny not to invade Christine's HQ to rescue Eve (Kate Magowan), and becomes annoyed at him when he does, and appears ready to hand Danny over to Christine until Eve is revealed as Helen.

In Series 4, Lester is a subordinate to Philip Burton (Alexander Siddig), whom he dislikes greatly, after the government makes a deal for Burton's company to subsidise the ARC and anomaly research. He is somewhat pleased by Abby and Connor's return, though he has to follow orders and have them fired due to new policies, but later finds a loophole to get them back on the team. He defies Burton's plan to kill the creatures in the ARC's menagerie, by blackmailing him with the fact that when the anomalies inevitably go public he will expose Burton as "the dinosaur killer" in sympathy for an upset Abby. In episode 4.5 he helps Matt Anderson (Ciarán McMenamin) locate Victorian-era woman Emily Merchant (Ruth Bradley), and in the next episode is informed of the Ethan Dobrowski (Jonathan Byrne) situation before he marries Jenny and her fiancé with special power from the Prime Minister. In the series finale he could not be more happy when Danny returned with the news that Helen was "as dead as a dodo".

Although he has previously been occasionally referred to in the credits as "Sir" James Lester, it is made clear in the first episode of Series 5 (when he thinks he is in line for one) that he does not actually have a knighthood. He was excited and thought that his interview would secure the knighthood, only to learn that it was for Philip and he had set aside any doubts. In episode 5.2, Lester is shown to have a large dislike of the Navy, especially when an admiral attempts to nuke the anomaly after the team's submarine had been pulled through, and is pleased when the admiral is berated by the Minister. When he returns in episode 5.5, he learns Matt is from the future and Philip is responsible for the end of the world, and when several anomalies begin opening he encourages Jess Parker (Ruth Kearney) to continue working, using polite words. When an anomaly opens in the ARC's carpark he goes to defend his new Jaguar from a "tree creeper" with an EMD. In the series finale he and Jess are attacked by mutated Future Predators in the ARC, and though he is heavily wounded, he survives.

=== Jenny Lewis ===
Jenny Lewis
- First appearance: Episode 2.1
- Last appearance: Episode 4.6
- Portrayed by: Lucy Brown

In-universe information
- Gender: Female
- Occupation: PR official
- Children: 0
- Nationality: English

Jennifer "Jenny" Lewis is played by Lucy Brown and replaced a physically identical but temperamentally different character, Claudia Brown, played by the same actress. She is 28 years old. At the end of the first series, Claudia disappeared off the timeline, much to the horror of Nick Cutter (Douglas Henshall), who found it difficult to adjust when Jenny appeared, looking exactly like Claudia.

Jenny's attitude contrasts with Claudia's. She is bossy and stubborn, ignoring Cutter's order to take the stairs in episode 2.2. Cutter states in episode 2.3 that Jenny is a "real piece of work" to which Jenny replies, "Thank you, I'll take that as a compliment".

Jenny was engaged, but in episode 2.7, Jenny states that she no longer has a fiancé, as he broke up the engagement after he thought that she had met another man, although as Jenny says, "I couldn't really tell him that it wasn't another man, as much as a something-a-saurus."

Cutter explains to Jenny that he has not had luck with women – Helen disappeared eight years before, and he claims the last woman in his life (Claudia Brown) left him.

Jenny is initially employed by James Lester (Ben Miller) to create cover stories for the activities of the Anomaly Research Centre, without being told what the ARC is really doing. She only discovers that the centre is involved in dealing with prehistoric animals when she disobeys a direct order and accidentally comes face-to-face with one that has come through the office block anomaly in episode 2.2. However, once she has got over the initial shock, Jenny quickly adjusts and takes the unusual nature of the job in her stride. Although her job is officially just public relations, she has no difficulty in taking a leadership role when necessary. She led an armoured team to investigate the church anomaly in episode 2.6 (though it is in fact a deliberate false alarm) and taking charge of the escape from Leek's secret facility in episode 2.7. In the latter she is also revealed to be a crack shot, shooting one of Leek's men from afar. She explains her ability by saying that her "friends preferred pony riding, I preferred clay pigeon shooting". Lester regards her as the most dependable member of the team, and makes her interim leader following the death of Cutter.

One quirk of Jenny's character is that she always wears high heeled shoes, which are not necessarily appropriate or practical for the work she does and sometimes hamper her. It was her reluctance to climb stairs in her high heels that first led her, in episode 2.2, to learn the truth about the ARC's purpose. In Series 3, she was more "sensible" in the way she dressed, wearing more suitable clothing, with her hair down, and less make-up, causing her to resemble Claudia much more.

Claudia remains out of existence for the rest of the series, although Jenny first appears in episode 2.1. At the end of episode 2.2, Cutter explains to Jenny as best he can about what could have happened to change the past. Claudia's job as Lester's assistant was changed to a man named Oliver Leek (Karl Theobald), who was revealed to be working for Helen Cutter (Juliet Aubrey). It was implied that Helen was responsible for Claudia being replaced by Jenny; however, this is thought not to be the case when Helen explains that the first change was an accident. It is still possible that Helen intentionally messed with Claudia/Jenny's past in order to enact revenge or to, as her obsessing in episode 2.7 would imply, re-set the stage for her and Nick to get together again.

In episode 3.3, Jenny confessed to Sarah Page (Laila Rouass) that she has fallen in love with Cutter. When Cutter was preparing to go back inside the burning ARC to look for Helen in episode 3.3, Jenny asked him not to go and thought it was a mistake, which is a reference to what Claudia Brown said the last time Cutter saw her before going through the Permian Anomaly. Later, as Cutter was dying in Connor Temple's (Andrew-Lee Potts) arms, he started to ask Connor to tell Claudia something, but then changed his mind and said nothing. When Cutter dies as the ARC explodes, Jenny bursts into tears along with Abby Maitland (Hannah Spearritt) and Connor, while Sarah watches on silently. Jenny said there was something she wanted to tell Cutter and that was that she loved him. Jenny is promoted by Lester temporarily to team leader in episode 3.4, though she has difficulty dealing with Cutter's death. In the following episode, Jenny discovers a photograph of Claudia Brown amongst Cutter's possessions, realising that she had in fact lived another life. At the end of the episode, after dying within the ARC and then being resuscitated by the team, she makes the decision to leave her position for the Anomaly Research Centre.

Later though in Series 4 of Primeval an anomaly opens in a mansion where Jenny and her fiancé are to be wed. Although she did not want to bump into them, she invites them to the wedding. Connor then reopens the anomaly after locking it and releases two prehistoric carnivorous mammals, Hyaenodon, on the loose causing havoc. Matt Anderson (Ciarán McMenamin), Jenny, Abby, Connor and Emily Merchant (Ruth Bradley) take care of the creatures, and Lester marries Jenny and her fiancé.

== M ==
=== Abby Maitland ===
Abby Maitland
- First appearance: Episode 1.1
- Last appearance: Episode 5.6
- Portrayed by: Hannah Spearritt

In-universe information
- Gender: Female
- Occupation: Zookeeper
- Family: Jack Maitland (brother)

Abigail Sarah Maitland is played by Hannah Spearritt.

ITV's official site says that while Abby has arachnophobia, she developed a love of reptiles when her parents took her on holiday to the Galapagos Islands as a child and has had a love affair with lizards ever since. Although she started university, she later left after only one term when she became a zookeeper. Always fit and athletic, her hobbies include gymnastics, Ashtanga yoga, karate, kick boxing, swimming and diving. She keeps gym equipment in her flat. Actress Hannah Spearritt also stated that Abby was abused as a child. In Series 1 she seemed to be attracted to Stephen Hart (James Murray), but in the second season she seems to be falling in love with Connor Temple (Andrew-Lee Potts).

She openly admits to falling in love with the wrong type of men – moody and dangerous. She also appears to have her feelings hurt easily but struggles to remain upbeat and positive. She can also be remarkably deceitful in order to get her own way as she lies to the government and to her teammates about her experiences with spiders so they will take her with them. She would not tell anyone that Rex came back through the anomaly with Nick Cutter (Douglas Henshall).

She is a zookeeper who first appears in the series when a small boy called Ben who alerts the zoo she works at about an escaped lizard he misidentifies as a modern-day lizard named Draco volans. She later angers Cutter when she and Connor go off to find an anomaly by themselves, but is allowed to stay because he admits he needs her skills. She later allows Connor to move into her flat on a purely platonic basis. She remains as the team lab assistant and sidekick up until episode 1.4 when she is almost contaminated by a deadly parasite by a student friend of work/flatmate Connor Temple.

Her love/hate relationship with Connor reaches a peak in episode 1.5 when she is enraged that he let everyone know that she's been keeping Rex in secret but later says that if he makes her breakfast on the weekends and does the washing up for a month then he can stay. She admits that this compromise is really because she actually likes having him around. Connor hugs her, prompting Abby to say she likes having him around as a friend, hinting that she is beginning to fall in love with him. How Abby has been changed by the changes in the timeline is unknown. Connor now has a girlfriend, Caroline Steel (Naomi Bentley), in this new timeline, but how this affects their relationship is unknown. Connor's girlfriend, much to Abby's horror, hates lizards, and the two do not get along. Also, her crush on Stephen, and their closeness because of it, seems to have completely disappeared in the second season.

In episode 2.1, Abby and Connor seem to have a much closer relationship than they did previously. This comes to the extent that Abby pays for Connor's slushie and lets Connor use her gun, even though there is a pack of raptors on the loose. Abby has a much better flat in the second series, and the reptile species that she keeps includes Rex the Coelurosauravus, a corn snake, a milk snake, leopard geckos, bearded dragons and a boa constrictor. In episode 2.2, Abby is quietly jealous of Caroline who Connor seems to have a relationship with. It is clear that Abby disapproves however, as she shows no sympathy when Connor has to leave for work or when he accidentally washes his number off. In episode 2.4, Abby is attacked by a futuristic Mer, and dragged through an anomaly to the future. Connor runs through, despite being injured, alone to help her, and tries to pull her over an overhang, and as he appears to be able to get her over, an enormous MerQueen looms over them, preparing to kill them. Abby begs him to let her go and escape, but he refuses, finally bursting out, "I can't! I love you!" She would later confront him about the matter but at this point Caroline comes for her date with Connor. Ironically, at one point Abby defeats a Mer using a kickboxing move that Caroline showed her, thus Caroline probably indirectly and unknowingly saved Abby's life.

In the Series 2 finale, Abby is captured with the rest of the team and held captive. When Caroline is thrown into the cell with Connor and Abby, the two girls fight, punching and kicking each other. Eventually, Abby slams Caroline against a wall, but Caroline uses her superior strength to pin Abby down. Abby bites her and she lets go, and the two continue to grapple briefly, much to Connor's shock and Oliver Leek's (Karl Theobald) amusement. Connor succeeds in breaking up the fight but when Caroline thanks him, he says "I didn't do it for you" and seems to remain close to Abby throughout the episode. She later forgives Caroline and even saves her life when they are kept in a room with a Smilodon. Abby splits off from the group as a distraction, and inadvertently turns off the power system and releases the creatures. Rex is shot in the episode, and Abby looks after him (but not before thanking Caroline for saving him). At the end of the episode, Abby and the rest of the team are at Stephen's funeral, where Abby lays flowers for him. As they leave, Abby reaches to hold Connor's hand, but the team get called out to an anomaly.

In Series 3, she and Connor continued to grow closer, though they were reluctant to do anything about their attraction. In episode 3.4, she is revealed to have a brother, Jack (Robert Lowe), who stays with her and forces Connor to move out temporarily. During episode 3.8, Abby desperately went through an anomaly to rescue Jack after he went through accidentally, risking her own life and the others because she did not want to lose him. At the end of the episode she and Connor kissed after Jack admitted to her that Connor had helped him get Rex back and losing him in a poker game, thankful that he had not made Jack look bad. At the start of episode 3.9, Abby visits Connor and explains that she does not want things to be 'weird' between them, making their relationship indefinite. However, when the pair are trapped in the Cretaceous while chasing Helen Cutter (Juliet Aubrey) with new team leader Danny Quinn (Jason Flemyng), she helps him to relax, and agrees to let him move back into her flat once they return home.

In episode 4.1, Connor and Abby have been living in the Cretaceous period for a year and by this time, Abby had lost all faith in getting back to the present. However, after finding an anomaly device they do manage to get back to the present, and both are told by the ARC that they are fired, due to new regulations stating that employees must be from a military/police background; although James Lester (Ben Miller) later reinstates them in episode 4.2. The opening episodes also show that Connor and Abby are a couple, this is shown by the two kissing at the end of 4.1, and Abby telling Duncan (James Bradshaw) that she is Connor's girlfriend. However their relationship becomes strained as they readjust to their jobs, particularly when Connor does not stay to support her as she tries to stop Philip Burton (Alexander Siddig) from killing the Rex and the other creatures in the ARC in episode 4.4, and when he blurts out about the possibility of getting married in episode 4.6.

In the fifth series she learned of Matt's mission and lent her help, though her relationship with Connor became strained as she could not tell him why she was trying to stop his obsessive work for Philip. In episode 5.3, she was not happy when Connor's new assistant April Leonard (Janice Byrne) suggested that she was nothing but a distraction for him, and this emboldened her to copy Connor's hard drive, despite refusing Matt Anderson (Ciarán McMenamin) earlier requests. When he caught her near his lab she tried to appeal to him by revealing Helen and Philip's association, though his apparent knowledge made him adamant she only wanted him away from Philip, creating further tension between them. She was furious at him when he opened his own anomaly in the ARC in episode 5.4, and set out to find Rex when he was loose in the ARC with an imminent gamma ray to kill a swarm of future beetles. In episode 5.5, she rescued Connor from a Kaprosuchus after he had been abandoned by Philip, and the two made up as Connor had realised he should have trusted Abby over Philip. At the "New Dawn" facility she threatened April with her EMD, and tried to go after Connor when he was pulled through the anomaly as it opened. In the series finale she and Matt go to rescue him from a pack of mutated Future Predators, and encourages Connor to return when he gives up hope, whispering something in his ear. After returning she comes up with a plan to paralyse the Future Predators in the ARC by using high frequency sounds, and once the crisis is over she asks Connor to marry her (what she told him in the future), which he agreed to.

In the first-season finale of Primeval: New World, Connor mentions that he has a wife, meaning that he and Abby have since gotten married following Series 5.

=== Jack Maitland ===
Jack Maitland
- First appearance: Episode 3.4
- Last appearance: Episode 3.8
- Portrayed by: Robert Lowe

In-universe information
- Gender: Male
- Family: Abby Maitland (sister); Connor Temple (brother-in-law)

Jack Maitland is the brother of Abby Maitland (Hannah Spearritt), played by Robert Lowe. He first appears in episode 3.4, when Connor Temple (Andrew-Lee Potts) mistakenly believes that Jack is Abby's boyfriend after he answers Abby's phone while she's out of the room. At the end of the episode Abby explains that Jack is her brother but asks Connor to move out for a couple of days so that Jack can stay with her. In episode 3.6, he invited his friends for a game of poker and used Rex. He gambled Rex and put him up for auction and neither Connor or Abby were happy with him. Connor felt he could've made Jack feel bad after he got Rex back from his friend, Tony, but he did not. In episode 3.8, he stole Abby's anomaly detector and found out she worked in a dangerous place and while playing around in a sports car, he went through the anomaly. He fell in a trap underground and broke his arm. He shouted "Help!" and Abby heard him. They got him safe and they all shouted at him for nearly killing Captain Becker (Ben Mansfield) (and almost himself). Jack moved out at the end of series three, and it was implied that Connor then moved back in with Abby. It is unknown if he knew of Abby's year-long disappearance.

In the first-season finale of Primeval: New World, Connor mentions that he has a wife, meaning that he and Abby have since gotten married following Series 5; this also means that Jack is Connor's brother-in-law.

=== Emily Merchant ===
Emily Merchant
- First appearance: Episode 4.3
- Last appearance: Episode 5.6
- Portrayed by: Ruth Bradley

In-universe information
- Gender: Female
- Spouse: Henry Merchant (deceased)
- Nationality: English

Lady Emily Merchant is a 28-year-old English woman who appeared in a theatre via an anomaly in episode 4.3. Born in London in 1840, she is familiar with travelling in time and was previously living with a group in the Cretaceous. She carries a stiletto and is capable of holding her own in a fight with humans or creatures.

She and Ethan Dobrowski (Jonathan Byrne) brought a sick woman, their friend Charlotte Cameron, to modern London in the hope of finding medical treatment. After Charlotte died she returned to the Cretaceous, but Matt Anderson (Ciarán McMenamin) brought her back thinking she was from the present and been attacked by a "tree creeper". She then asked him to keep her presence secret while she tried to find Ethan. In episode 4.4 she was kidnapped by Ethan from Matt's flat. In episode 4.5 Ethan took her to a cemetery and left her tied and gagged in a coffin, until she was rescued by Matt. She forms a close relationship with Matt, but in episode 4.6, she is revealed to have been married before she went through the anomalies, but told Matt that she had only married out of her father's wishes and had never loved him. In episode 4.7 she returns to the 19th century so as not to distract Matt from his mission to save humanity, which he admitted after she figured out he was not from the present day.

She features in episode 5.3, where she has been trying to find a raptor that has been killing people in 19th-century London, while being forced back into a subservient role by her husband Henry. She reunites with Matt, and refuses to hear what Matt has learned about her future until Henry arrives. Abby and Matt had discovered that Henry would institutionalise her for apparent insanity, though mostly for the position she has been putting him in lately. After capturing the raptor she initially refuses to return with him to the present, but does so when Henry arrives and threatens Matt at gunpoint, and after he is killed by the raptor she decides to stay. During the next few episodes she becomes part of the ARC team, helping with creature incursions.

== P ==
=== Sarah Page ===
Sarah Page
- First appearance: Episode 3.1
- Last appearance: Episode 3.10
- Portrayed by: Laila Rouass

In-universe information
- Gender: Female
- Occupation: Egyptologist

Sarah Page studies Egyptology before joining the ARC team in Series 3. She joins after witnessing a Pristichampsus attack the British History Museum in the first episode. Nick Cutter (Douglas Henshall) is impressed with her skills and asks her to join the team, which she accepts. after she makes a remark, Cutter sets her the task of finding out if the old myths and legends of the past could have a link with the anomalies. Sarah is shown to have a brother and sister type relationship with Connor Temple (Andrew-Lee Potts). When the ARC is attacked by Helen Cutter's (Juliet Aubrey) Cleaner Clones (Tim Faraday) in episode 3.3, she is captured along with Jenny Lewis (Lucy Brown) and James Lester (Ben Miller). She is the one who makes the audio tape that eventually stops Helen's clones. Sarah makes it out of the fire raging inside the ARC and watches on in shock while Cutter is lying dead on the floor after Connor has brought him from the exploding building.

In episode 3.4, Sarah works with Connor on cleaning up the "artifact" that Cutter took from Helen and finds out that it contains a map of the matrix of anomalies that Cutter had created at the beginning of the series. In episode 3.6, she is forced to go into hiding with Danny Quinn (Jason Flemyng), Abby Maitland (Hannah Spearritt) and Connor after Christine Johnson (Belinda Stewart-Wilson) takes over the ARC, she and the rest of the team are forced to take refuge in an old abandoned cabin. When Lester is reinstated to the ARC thanks to Captain Becker (Ben Mansfield), Sarah kisses Becker on the cheek as a reward. After episode 3.6, she takes a more hands on approach and goes out with the team to the anomaly sites, she goes back in time to find out information about the knight who came through an anomaly. In episode 3.9, she finds out that the woman who Danny is with is actually Helen Cutter in disguise, but she is too late to stop her from taking Christine hostage. In episode 3.10, she and Becker are the only two members of the team to be in the present day, with Connor, Abby and Danny stuck on the other sides of different anomalies. She ends by saying she has an idea although it is unexplained what this is.

Sarah did not return in Series 4. Her death was implied through Becker's flashback in a Series 4 webisode. Becker and Sarah are known to have led rescue missions to try to find the others by going through the future anomaly. During their last attempt, Sarah was killed by an unknown creature, though it is implied to be a Future Predator as her cries to Becker are heard over a visual of a Future Predator attacking the car she was probably in.

=== Jess Parker ===
Jess Parker
- First appearance: Episode 4.1
- Last appearance: Episode 5.6
- Portrayed by: Ruth Kearney

In-universe information
- Gender: Female
- Occupation: Field Coordinator

Jessica "Jess" Parker is the team's field coordinator, using her skills to help the team and direct their movements, all from her control station at the ARC. Although only 19, Jess displays an outstanding level of organisation and efficiency, providing a stable environment for the team during their missions, and also has a crush on Captain Becker (Ben Mansfield).

Jess accidentally released the Dracorex from the ARC's manergerie in the beginning of Series 4, and later coordinated the team as they dealt with a Spinosaurus that had followed Connor Temple (Andrew-Lee Potts) and Abby Maitland (Hannah Spearritt) through the Anomaly. She was sympathetic towards Connor as his job had been rendered unnecessary since his disappearance, and offered for him and Abby to stay at her flat. When Matt Anderson (Ciarán McMenamin) was gone she asked him to get her some chocolates but he forgot, however Becker got her some, leaving her flustered as she later asked about the old team and Becker. She did not seem to realise the seriousness of the job until she witnessed a teenager being killed on CCTV footage in episode 4.4. She was afraid when Becker was poisoned by a creature, but relieved when he recovered and tried comforting him. In episode 4.6, she joins Becker on his stakeout to catch Ethan Dobrowski (Jonathan Byrne) and instead of fleeing a trap that Becker was caught in stayed to disarm the bomb, and she hugged him in relief.

She is allergic to insect bites and keeps an epi pen, as shown in episode 5.4 when she is bitten by a future beetle and almost dies. Becker takes care of her throughout this ordeal, determined to get her help, showing her feelings may be returned. In the final episode, Jess and Lester are trapped in the ARC with a creature on the loose

== Q ==
=== Danny Quinn ===
Danny Quinn
- First appearance: Episode 3.2
- Last appearance: Episode 4.7
- Portrayed by: Jason Flemyng

In-universe information
- Gender: Male
- Occupation: Former Police Officer Team Leader
- Relatives: Patrick Quinn (Ethan Dobrowski) (brother)
- Nationality: English

Danny Quinn is a former police officer and team leader, and is played by Jason Flemyng.

He was investigating the death of two teenagers (one being his brother, Patrick) in a house believed to be haunted. He suspected Ryan Mason as the murderer, as he was the third teenager in the house, who escaped. Danny frequently went to the house to arrest trespassers, and at first thought the team were breaking in. He then arrests Connor Temple (Andrew-Lee Potts) and discovers a futuristic Camouflage beast, as well as the anomalies. He discovers that the creature was the one that murdered his brother. He shoots the Camouflage beast back through the anomaly. He returns, following the team on his motorbike when they arrive in an airport and pilots a helicopter through the anomaly so the Giganotosaurus that had come through followed him back. He is lucky to escape, as when he returns to the present he is being hunted by a pack of Giganotosaurus, and Connor locks the anomaly just in time. In the next episode he breaks into the ARC and, armed with flamethrowers, searches for a fungus from the future in the London underground with the team. He plans to burn it but Sarah Page (Laila Rouass) phones Jenny Lewis (Lucy Brown) to warn him not to use the flamethrowers. The team manage to get the fungus into a van, then he drives it back into the ARC. They then lose the creature briefly, but it appears in the communications room, while Jenny is still there. He risks his life to go in the frozen room to distract the creature, thus saves Jenny's life. James Lester (Ben Miller) decides he will be the new team leader, as suggested by Jenny, who decided to leave. It was implied that he fancied Jenny, but she left the team too soon for any relationship to occur between them.

While checking security in the ARC he breaks through the ventilation shafts and then battles the terror birds, tricking them into the anomaly by using a loud speakerphone recording of their calling. He later battles Sir William, a medieval knight, and is almost run through by his sword. He is revealed to know Latin fairly fluently. During a trip to the future in episode 3.8, he witnessed Eve (Kate Magowan) – Helen Cutter (Juliet Aubrey) in disguise – enter the present, and in the following episode rescued her from Christine Johnson's (Belinda Stewart-Wilson) base, returning her to the ARC before realising who she really was. Along with Connor, Sarah, Abby Maitland (Hannah Spearritt) and Captain Becker (Ben Mansfield) he follows her back to Christine's HQ and witnesses the death of Christine at the hands of a Future Predator. In the following episode he travels back to the future with Connor and Abby, only to chase Helen into the past, and onwards into the deeper past alone, after Connor is injured. Danny witnesses the death of Helen in the deep past, and assures that the human race survives, before finding himself stranded when the anomaly closes. Trapped, alone in the past, Danny cries out in anger as Series 3 draws to a close.

Danny returned in the episode 4.7, having survived his time in the Pliocene. However, as he came through the anomaly he was shot by Matt Anderson (Ciarán McMenamin) with an EMD. He woke up sometime later, relieved to be back. While the team were also dealing with a man named Ethan Dobrowski (Jonathan Byrne), Danny helped Abby and Connor in sending a Terror Bird through a satellite anomaly. When Ethan held Danny at gunpoint, he recognised him as his brother Patrick, who had survived his encounter with the camouflage beast and had been driven mad while going through the anomalies. He reported Helen's death to a pleased Lester, and was suspicious of Philip Burton (Alexander Siddig) when they met, having found a document on Helen's body with Philip's name on it. While speaking with Patrick he pleaded to be allowed to go through the anomaly, only to be knocked out. He and Matt went after Patrick, who escaped into the Pliocene. Danny decided to follow him, unwilling to risk Patrick making it to another human inhabited era. Before he departed he left a warning to Matt that Philip could not be trusted, asking him to warn the others.

== R ==
=== Tom Ryan ===
Tom Ryan
- First appearance: Episode 1.1
- Last appearance: Episode 1.6
- Portrayed by: Mark Wakeling

In-universe information
- Gender: Male
- Title: Captain
- Occupation: Special Operations Captain

Captain Tom Ryan is played by Mark Wakeling. He was the leader of the special forces unit that supported Nick Cutter (Douglas Henshall) and his team. Ryan was said to have joined the army at 17, saw active service in both Gulf wars, joined the SAS, then transferred to a special elite unit engaged in top secret operations. He had led an army walking team to the South Pole and back in record time and commented that it was chilly on his return. He was attacked by a Future Predator at the end of Series 1 and died shortly afterwards. He was replaced in Series 3, by Captain Becker (Ben Mansfield).

Ryan was a background character who was in charge of the military support, but generally followed Cutter's orders, whilst deferring to the government officials. When told to shoot the flying creature on the golf course he does so despite Cutter's protests, and in episode 1.3 he is willing to capture Helen Cutter (Juliet Aubrey) when ordered to, despite Cutter's disapproval. In general, he does not appear to have a close relationship with the rest of the team.

In his final scene, he attempts to save Cutter by opening fire on the Future Predator, knowing full well it will give his position away and he is mortally wounded. Cutter rushes to him after the Future Predator is killed by a Gorgonopsid, and Ryan reminisces about their first trip through the anomaly. It soon becomes clear that Ryan's role in the series is as a catalyst for the change in the timeline that occurs at the end of Series 1.

In episode 1.1 he first appears towards the end as they are about to perform an expedition into the anomaly. It is said he has seen action in the first gulf war and has had experience in desert combat. When Cutter refuses to leave towards the end of the expedition he knocks Cutter out with the handle of his pistol. When Cutter comes round he hits him but Ryan hits him back harder and tells him not to do that, he says he will stay with Cutter if he refuses to leave but both decide to leave. In episode 1.2, he leads the special forces unit into the London underground where they come into contact with giant spiders, the team cannot fire in enclosed spaces and try to fight them off with their fists but are forced back because of the sheer number of them. He then later accompanies Cutter and Connor Temple (Andrew-Lee Potts) to collect venom from the Arthropleura in the tube station, once the venom has been collected Cutter tells him to finish off the centipede but despite initial success shooting him the centipede disarms him but Connor comes in with a chair forcing him in to a generator electrocuting and killing it. In episode 1.3, he firstly helps operate the rope on Cutter when he dives through the underwater anomaly and helps pull him out when a Mosasaur destroys his oxygen tank then leads the special forces into the anomaly to capture Helen Cutter and forcibly bring her back.

In episode 1.4, his team accompany Helen to an anomaly where a pack of sabre-toothed cats are supposed to be, and when she escapes he pursues her but she escapes through a series of anomalies on the other side. Then a flock of dodos come through the anomaly. Cutter and his team, with difficulty, round up all but one of the dodos and send them back through the anomaly. When an infected Tom (Jake Curran), Connor's friend, attacks Abby Maitland (Hannah Spearritt), he and his special forces team arrive and fix their laser sights on him, but, before they can shoot him, Connor blocks the way, and despite his protest he is forced not to shoot and Connor talks Tom out of his rage. In episode 1.5, his team accompany Cutter to a golf course where a flying creature is killing people. When ordered to shoot a Pteranodon (which is not the creature killing the humans) he obeys but Cutter pushes him, making his shot miss. He looks at Cutter resentfully. At the end, when the Pteranodon flies back into the Anomaly while everyone else in Cutter's team are cheering, he simply lowers his gun and appears happy. In episode 1.6 when pursuing the futuristic creature he says to Cutter he is happy that the team is allowed to kill this one as he was starting to feel "like a bloody social worker." He is mortally wounded by the Future Predator, and correctly predicts himself to be the skeleton they found in the first episode.

The BBC America website revealed that initially Captain Ryan was going to be killed off in the first episode, but Mark Wakeling acted so well that they commissioned him for the entire series. Henshall also stated that he would have wanted Ryan to be like the character of Kenny McCormick in South Park, being killed and resurrected throughout the different series.

== S ==
=== Caroline Steel ===
Caroline Steel
- First appearance: Episode 2.2
- Last appearance: Episode 2.7
- Portrayed by: Naomi Bentley

In-universe information
- Gender: Female

Caroline Steel is a supporting villain played by Naomi Bentley. Steel meets Connor Temple (Andrew-Lee Potts) in episode 2.2 in a local DVD store where Connor was looking for science fiction DVDs.

She loves cats and dogs, but is scared of lizards (possibly all reptiles) much to the shock of Abby Maitland (Hannah Spearritt). It is eventually revealed that Caroline is working for Oliver Leek (Karl Theobald) – though she is largely ignorant of Leek's plans – and is using Connor to get to the team. Caroline has plans to appear on television, but so far has failed to appear upon Big Brother and X Factor. Apparently she is 22 years old, 157 centimetres tall and was born in Hackney, London. She enjoys running, dancing, fencing, squash, kick boxing, paintballing and "metal detector". Her bitter rivalry with Abby arises from Abby's suspicions that Caroline's interest in Connor is not genuine.

In episode 2.5, furious about being dumped by Connor, Caroline attacks Rex, so as to avenge herself against Abby. She takes Rex to Leek, who pays a substantial bounty. When Caroline asks what the job was about, Leek offers to show her and takes her to see his secret facility, knowing that Cutter's team will attempt to retrieve Rex by triangulating the signal from Caroline's mobile phone – thereby leading them into Leek's trap.

In episode 2.7, Caroline arrives to look at what Leek is actually doing with Rex. She is immediately repulsed, and keeps asking Leek why she cannot go home. Leek takes her and the rest of the team hostage. In their cell, she is threatened by Abby, and the two of them fight, punching and kicking each other. Connor splits them up, and Caroline thanks him. Connor replies "I didn't do it for you". She explains that she was money – driven and asks Connor for forgiveness. Not only does Connor accept her apology, but Abby saves Caroline's life from a Smilodon. Later on, as they escape, Caroline even shows sympathy to Rex, rescuing him after he is injured.

Later on, Caroline is seen briefly at Stephen Hart's (James Murray) funeral, despite the two characters never meeting on screen, and tries to remind Connor that he still has her mobile number. She then leaves and does not return to the series.

== T ==
=== Connor Temple ===
Connor Temple
- First appearance: Episode 1.1
- Last appearance: Episode 5.6
- Portrayed by: Andrew-Lee Potts

In-universe information
- Gender: Male
- Nationality: English

Connor Temple is played by Andrew-Lee Potts, who relates strongly to his character. He is one of the main characters, a student of Palaeontology at the (fictional) Central Metropolitan University. He is one of a group of people who discover that prehistoric and extinct animals are passing through anomalies in time and space. When the Home Office assigns his professor Nick Cutter (Douglas Henshall) to tackling the problems these creatures cause, Connor tags along and is accepted as an aid to the rest of the team.

Connor is seen as a geek, he enjoys science fiction television and films such as Blake's 7, Battlestar Galactica and Star Wars. He has an enormous interest in dinosaurs and other prehistoric animals, and has created a database of prehistoric creatures. He is also interested in conspiracy theories and cryptozoology. It is this interest in these that piques his interest in a reported monster sighting (of a Gorgonopsid near the Forest of Dean), which he takes to Cutter and eventually leads him and the others into discovering an Anomaly over the course of episode 1.1. At the beginning of series one, Connor is seen as a student of Cutter's, although he has already completed his dissertation, despite Cutter never showing up for his lectures. Later in episode 1.1, he claims he has "sinus issues and allergies", but his database proves invaluable and he becomes part of the team. In episode 1.2, he admits he started the Duke of Edinburgh's Award, but did not complete it, due to a sprained ankle.

While Connor finds the idea of the time anomalies exciting, he questions his own usefulness after he leads Abby Maitland (Hannah Spearritt) on a wild goose chase in episode 1.2, especially after being reprimanded for it. He is also admittedly unsettled and afraid of some of the more dangerous creatures. Later, he almost leaves the team after one of his friends is killed by a parasite from the past in episode 1.4, but is persuaded to stay by Cutter. He has a well known crush on Abby, who he is currently living with. Although, he ended up dating a girl named Caroline Steel (Naomi Bentley) in the new timeline.

Connor still lives in Abby's flat in Series 2, and the pair still have a close bond. In episode 2.1 Abby and Connor seem to spend a lot more time together than they did in the previous series. Connor is also irritated by the fact that the rest of the team do not trust him with firearms. In episode 2.1 he accidentally shoots Abby with a tranquilliser dart intended for a baby raptor and in episode 2.3 he shoots a costumed man playing the furry mascot of an adventure park, mistaking him for a Smilodon (though being such a poor shot, he does no real damage). Connor makes himself useful to the team by building, programming and operating the Anomaly Detection Device, based on Cutter's discovery that anomalies cause radio interference. Connor is also the first character to notice that the team is being followed by a mysterious man, who later turns out to have been working for Oliver Leek (Karl Theobald).

In the second series, Connor also gets a new girlfriend called Caroline. Caroline and Connor meet in a DVD store and he invites her back to Abby's flat with him. After Connor nearly gets eaten by a giant worm in the episode and gets covered in giant worm slime, he accidentally wipes Caroline's number off his hand. Connor clearly worries about Caroline, and by the end of the episode seems to put her ahead of Abby, much to the latter's confusion. In episode 2.4, Connor is distraught when Abby is mistaken as dead, and searches for her. He does eventually find her, but is dragged into the future by the Mer. When Abby is dangling from the side of a cliff, Connor tells her that he loves her. Abby later confronts Connor about this, but due to embarrassment, did not re-approach the matter, and went on a date with Caroline, leaving Abby upset and confused. In episode 2.5, Connor dumps Caroline after he believes that the two are not ideal for one another. (In fact, unknown to him, Caroline has been paid by Leek to spy on Connor.) This now opens him up to Abby, and seeks Stephen Hart's (James Murray) help as he is still unsure of whether Abby is interested in him. Connor remained faithful to Abby throughout the final episode of the season, and drags her out of a fight with Caroline. Connor was shocked to find out that Caroline only went out with him because she was getting paid. Leek says that he and Connor are similar, saying that they are both "Uncool, nerdy and never get the attractive girls". To this Connor makes another sarcastic remark, saying "Speak for yourself". Connor is very caring towards Abby, Caroline and Jenny Lewis (Lucy Brown), whom he makes sure all climb the ladder to escape before he does. Finally, Connor is seen at the end of the episode at Stephen's funeral. He seems close to Abby, but Caroline is invited to the funeral, despite the fact the two characters never met. Caroline reminds Connor he has her mobile number and then quickly leaves. As Connor and Abby themselves leave, Abby makes to hold Connor's hand, but Cutter receives an urgent call of a high-priority anomaly. In one of the final scenes, Connor is seen in the back of Cutter's car with a gun, suggesting that Cutter is trusting him with guns.

In the third season his and Abby's relationship continues to grow stronger, though neither continue to do anything about it. In episode 3.3, he adopts a pair of Diictodon trapped in the present, naming them Sid and Nancy. After the ARC exploded Connor ran back into the building to find Cutter. When he did he found that he had been shot. Connor wants to help him, but Cutter tells him to sit down and they start to talk. Cutter tells him that he is now in charge and has to carry on his work of tracking and exploring the anomalies. He then gives him the mysterious artefact that Helen Cutter (Juliet Aubrey) was trying to work out what it was. Connor is then seen carrying Cutter's body out of the burning building and then after everyone realises he is dead he is seen crying and comforting a crying Abby. In episode 3.4 Connor was still distraught over his death, and set about creating a device to lock anomalies, and was worried when he heard Abby was hanging out with someone else. However it was only Abby's baby brother Jack (Robert Lowe), who was going to be staying at her flat, forcing him to move out for a while. He eventually moves in with James Lester (Ben Miller) after a short time staying in the ARC. In episode 3.6, he and Sarah Page (Laila Rouass) get the artefact to open for a short while, revealing that it predicted anomalies and that Cutter had been right about its importance, and did his best to keep it safe when the team was hiding from Christine Johnson (Belinda Stewart-Wilson) and a flock of terror birds. At the end of episode 3.8, Abby kisses Connor after she finds out from Jack, that Connor got Rex back after Jack lost him in a game of poker which he did as he did not want to hurt Abby when she was already distraught. In episode 3.9, they agree to try to not make things weird between them, and realised Helen had invaded the ARC with Sarah. In the Series 3 finale he, Abby and Danny Quinn (Jason Flemyng) go in pursuit of Helen and he discovers that Helen will be the cause of Site 333, the location of the First Family, a group of thirteen homonids who all died mysteriously at once, from Helen poisoning them. Connor was injured while fighting a pack of raptors in the Cretaceous, and Abby stays with him in the while Danny pursues Helen. They are last seen hiding in a tree as night falls, talking about going home.

In episode 4.1, it is highlighted that Connor and Abby have been living in the Cretaceous period for a year. After a raptor steals Abby's blanket, Connor goes to retrieve it from the raptor's nest and finds Helen's anomaly device that she dropped in the series 3 finale. After using it to get back to the present, both are told by the ARC that they are fired, due to new regulations stating that employees must be from a military/police background (which neither are). Connor and Abby are a couple at this point, shown by the two kissing at the end of episode 4.1, and Abby saying that she is "his" (Connor's) girlfriend to Duncan (James Bradshaw) in episode 4.2. In the same episode Connor decided to track down his old friend after not being reinstated like Abby, and came to learn of a Kaprosuchus that had been causing trouble, and after helping deal with the Kaprosuchus got his old job back. Connor accidentally trapped Philip Burton (Alexander Siddig) and Rex in a room with the oxygen being sucked out in episode 4.3, and after rectifying the situation Philip thanked him, seeing his talent. In episode 4.4, he saved two students from Therocephalians, and did not support Abby's campaign to save the menagerie creatures following Philip's plan to kill them all. In episode 4.5, Philip asked Connor to work for him at Prospero studying the anomalies, and Connor was unsure, not wanting to abandon the team. After learning that acid was what was affecting an unstable anomaly, he believed that a Labyrinthodont had killed Abby he attacked it in a rage, only to learn she was okay and asked her not to make him worry like that again. He then agreed to work for Philip, but only in his spare time. In episode 4.6, he and Abby meet up with Jenny when she is getting married, and Connor blurted out the possibility of him and Abby getting married, which helped to create more tension in the relationship, particularly after he had not supported Abby. In episode 4.7, he became worried after figuring out two anomalies had opened on the same spot, and began to look into the ARC's anomaly data, discovering they were going to continue multiplying. After telling Philip, he asked they keep it between them until they found a solution.

In episode 5.1, Philip shows him his machine called "New Dawn", from which he hopes to take energy from anomalies and turn it into green energy, and assigned Connor an assistant named April Leonard (Janice Byrne) when he agreed to help. He was later taken by a burrowing creature from the future, but survived, and came up with a plan to blow up the rest of the creatures in a warehouse. In episode 5.3, Connor was kept busy by April, and when he caught Abby near his lab she tried to appeal to him by revealing Helen and Philip's association, though Philip had told him this already (having made him believe Helen had only known of Philip), and was adamant Abby only wanted him away from Philip, creating further tension between them. At the end of the episode he created his own anomaly in the ARC, and in episode 5.4 told Abby he only wanted to do what he thought what would make Cutter proud, and his anomaly caused a swarm of future beetles to invade the ARC. Connor tried to make up for what he had done, and came up with a plan to kill all the beetles by closing his anomaly and unleashing a gamma ray, though only after Abby and Matt Anderson (Ciarán McMenamin) revealed they possessed a copy of his laptop's hard drive (which Matt had earlier blasted) in order to allow this. He later learned that Philip had tried to blow the building up, and then went through Prospero's files, learning of Philip and Helen's partnership and that Philip had created a larger version of his machine. In episode 5.5, he attempted to slow down Philip on the way to "New Dawn", but when a Kaprosuchus attacked Philip refused to believe Connor's claims that "New Dawn" would destroy the world and was left behind. After being rescued by Abby, the two made up as Connor realised he should have trusted Abby over Philip. At the "New Dawn" facility he tried to go sabotage "New Dawn", only to fail and fall through the anomaly as it opened. In the series finale he is rescued from a pack of Future Predators by Abby and Matt. He gave up hope until Abby whispered something in his ear which convinced him to continue. After returning he came up with a plan to merge his anomaly with the "New Dawn" one, which succeeded as it imploded. Once the crisis was over, it was revealed Abby had asked Connor to marry her while they had been in the future, which he agreed to.

Connor appears in two episodes of the spin-off series, Primeval: New World. He first appears in episode 1, The New World. He arrives in Vancouver to locate a handheld Anomaly Detector in Evan Cross's possession. He first spots Evan and Tony Drake using his own version of a detector to try to locate an anomaly in Stanley Park. After breaking into the Tank, smooth-talking his way past Angelicka Finch, Connor finds the detector hidden in the frame of Evan's deceased wife. He later appears at the scene of Drake's death after a creature attack, and confronts Evan about the detector. He warns Evan of the dangers of tampering with the anomalies, and suggests that he leave the whole situation alone. However suspecting that Evan will not listen, he advises Evan to make sure that everything goes back to where it belongs before he leaves. He returns in the finale The Sound of Thunder, Part 2, chasing an Albertosaurus through the streets of London, using the new "Type V" EMD, and follows new ARC member Kieran through an anomaly into a Spaghetti Junction. Looking for Kieran, he instead comes upon Dylan Weir, and they work to rescue Evan in the Silurian, before they go to find Kieran in another anomaly. Upon returning to the Junction, Connor is taken into Colonel Hall's custody. He speaks with Mac, who was an ARC member in an alternate timeline, and convinces Ange to let him and Kieran go, warning her before he leaves through the anomaly that messing with them is bad news.

In the season finale of New World, Connor mentions that he has a wife, meaning that he and Abby may have since gotten married following series 5 as he does not mention her name.

=== Tom ===
Tom, played by Jake Curran, should not be confused with Tom Ryan (Mark Wakeling), an SAS soldier. He is a friend of Connor Temple (Andrew-Lee Potts) and Duncan (James Bradshaw) and a fellow geek. He appears to be the bossier "leader" of Connor's friends and is the one that seems to come up with the "plans" whereas Duncan is quite happy to follow, he also seems to be slightly more aggressive than Duncan, both with and without the parasite infecting him.

He also seems to enjoy conspiracy theories. Despite this he does not believe Connor when he tries to tell he and Duncan what he has been involved in without breaking the Official Secrets Act, and he and Duncan devise their own conspiracy theories around the dodo that they capture (none of which are particularly rational).

He is infected by a prehistoric parasite which makes him more aggressive, photophobic, and he attempts to pass on the parasite. He manages to avoid biting anyone apart from a doctor, who was examining him. The team did not find him in time to save him which resulted in his death with his last words being "I'm a hero."

== W ==
=== Captain Wilder ===
Captain Wilder
- First appearance: Episode 3.4
- Last appearance: Episode 3.9
- Portrayed by: Alex McSweeney

In-universe information
- Gender: Male
- Occupation: Security

Captain Wilder, played by Alex McSweeney, is Christine Johnson's (Belinda Stewart-Wilson) head of security in Series 3. He takes an active role in several episodes and is Christine's choice to succeed Nick Cutter (Douglas Henshall) as leader of the anomaly response team, as part of her plot to seize control of the ARC from James Lester (Ben Miller). This fails, and Lester appoints Danny Quinn (Jason Flemyng) instead. It is also revealed that Captain Becker (Ben Mansfield) from the ARC knew Wilder at Sandhurst. Later Wilder is recognised by Danny at a distance, leading to the discovery that Wilder and Christine have captured Eve (Kate Magowan) – actually the disguised Helen Cutter (Juliet Aubrey) – from the future. In episode 3.9 he points his gun at Helen who threatens to kill Christine if the artefact is not given to her.
