= List of Primeval episodes =

This is a list of episodes for the British television drama series Primeval. It premiered on ITV on 10 February 2007 and ran for five series and 36 episodes in total. It was cancelled in June 2009 after the third series, with the network stating it was struggling to fund any more original programming. On 29 September 2009, the station announced it had formed a deal with the digital channels Watch, BBC America, and German broadcaster Pro7, to recommission the programme for the fourth and fifth series. Series 5 of six episodes began on 24 May 2011 on digital channel Watch and was repeated on ITV from 16 June 2012.

== Series overview ==
The first series revolves around "the team" forming, following several creature attacks in the Forest of Dean, as well as Nick Cutter's search for Helen Cutter, his missing wife, who had suddenly reappeared after eight years. Throughout the series, Nick becomes romantically involved with James Lester's PA, Claudia Brown. In the first series' finale Cutter travels through a time anomaly, and upon his return he discovers that Claudia Brown no longer exists, and the timeline has changed. In Series 2, Cutter adjusts to the new timeline while hunting for a traitor in the group. It marks the last appearance of the character Stephen Hart, who dies at the end of the series. In the third series, Cutter is killed, while Jason Flemyng joins the cast as Police Officer Danny Quinn. Ben Mansfield also joins as Captain Becker, the team's armed support, replacing Stephen Hart. The climax has Connor, Abby, and Quinn pursuing Helen through anomalies to prevent her exterminating the human ancestors. They succeed, Helen is killed, but they remain trapped in past eras.

A year later, both in real and series time, Series 4 began (introduced by a webisode prologue) with Lester now reporting to an industrialist, Philip Burton, who has secret plans to use anomalies, and with a new team leader, Matt Anderson. Abby, and Connor return and have to win back their places on the team.

Series	Episodes	Originally released			Average UK viewers (millions)
Series	Episodes	First released	Last released	Network	Average UK viewers (millions)
1	6	10 February 2007	17 March 2007	ITV	6.39
2	7	12 January 2008	23 February 2008	ITV	6.29
3	10	28 March 2009	6 June 2009	ITV	4.99
4	7	1 January 2011	5 February 2011	ITV	4.03
5	6	24 May 2011	28 June 2011	Watch	0.67

== Episodes ==
=== Series 1 (2007) ===
No. overall	No. in series	Episode	Directed by	Written by	Original release date	UK viewers (millions)
1	1	Episode 1 "Leapin' Lizards"	Cilla Ware	Adrian Hodges	10 February 2007	7.09
2	2	Episode 2 "Underground Infestation"	Cilla Ware	Adrian Hodges	17 February 2007	6.29
3	3	Episode 3 "Helen Makes Contact"	Cilla Ware	Adrian Hodges	24 February 2007	6.17
4	4	Episode 4 "Dodo Madness"	Jamie Payne	Richard Kurti and Bev Doyle	3 March 2007	5.81
5	5	Episode 5 "Pter-able News"	Jamie Payne	Chris Lang	10 March 2007	6.46
6	6	Episode 6 "Future Foe"	Jamie Payne	Adrian Hodges	17 March 2007	6.52

=== Series 2 (2008) ===
No. overall	No. in series	Episode	Directed by	Written by	Original release date	UK viewers (millions)
7	1	Episode 1 "Jurassic Mall"	Jamie Payne	Adrian Hodges	12 January 2008	6.32
8	2	Episode 2 "Mealworms, Indeed"	Andrew Gunn	Adrian Hodges	19 January 2008	6.05
9	3	Episode 3 "Catfight"	Jamie Payne	Richard Kurti and Bev Doyle	26 January 2008	6.27
10	4	Episode 4 "Underwater Menace"	Jamie Payne	Cameron McAllister	2 February 2008	6.39
11	5	Episode 5 "Silurian Sands"	Andrew Gunn	Ben Court and Caroline Ip	9 February 2008	6.33
12	6	Episode 6 "Traitor Revealed"	Nick Murphy	Paul Cornell	16 February 2008	6.44
13	7	Episode 7 "Concrete Menagerie"	Nick Murphy	Adrian Hodges	23 February 2008	6.20

=== Series 3 (2009) ===
No. overall	No. in series	Episode	Directed by	Written by	Original release date	UK viewers (millions)
14	1	Episode 1 "Crocodile Fears"	Tony Mitchell	Steve Bailie	28 March 2009	5.89
15	2	Episode 2 "Haunted House"	Cilla Ware	James Moran	4 April 2009	4.94
16	3	Episode 3 "Medical Mayhem"	Tony Mitchell	Mike Cullen	11 April 2009	3.28
17	4	Episode 4 "A Gigantic Problem"	Mark Everest	Paul Mousley	18 April 2009	4.97
18	5	Episode 5 "Future Epidemic"	Mark Everest	Catherine Linstrum and Paul Mousley	25 April 2009	5.20
19	6	Episode 6 "For the Birds"	Cilla Ware	Paul Farrell	2 May 2009	5.27
20	7	Episode 7 "Dragon Tales"	Richard Curson Smith	Andrew Rattenbury	9 May 2009	5.34
21	8	Episode 8 "Oh, Brother"	Richard Curson Smith	Cameron McAllister	16 May 2009	5.13
22	9	Episode 9 "Herd Logic"	Matthew Thompson	Paul Farrell	23 May 2009	4.97
23	10	Episode 10 "The Chase Continues"	Matthew Thompson	Steve Bailie	6 June 2009	4.95

=== Series 4 (2011) ===
No. overall	No. in series	Episode	Directed by	Written by	Original release date	UK viewers (millions)
24	1	Episode 1 "Back from the Cretaceous"	Mark Everest	Paul Mousley	1 January 2011	4.45
25	2	Episode 2 "Be Inconspicuous"	Mark Everest	Steve Bailie	2 January 2011	3.29
26	3	Episode 3 "Lockdown"	Cilla Ware	Debbie Oates	8 January 2011	4.17
27	4	Episode 4 "Breakfast Club"	Cilla Ware	Paul Gerstenberger	15 January 2011	4.15
28	5	Episode 5 "The Worm"	Robert Quinn	Adrian Hodges & John Fay	22 January 2011	4.21
29	6	Episode 6 "The Brave Bride"	Robert Quinn	Matthew Parkhill	29 January 2011	3.83
30	7	Episode 7 "Surprising Visit"	Mark Everest	Paul Mousley	5 February 2011	4.09

=== Series 5 (2011) ===
No. overall	No. in series	Episode	Directed by	Written by	Original release date	UK viewers (millions)
31	1	Episode 1 "Matt's Secret"	Mark Everest	Chris Lang	24 May 2011	0.857 (Watch) 2.55 (ITV)
32	2	Episode 2 "The Submarine"	Robert Quinn	Steve Bailie	31 May 2011	0.761 (Watch) 1.77 (ITV)
33	3	Episode 3 "In The Good Old Days"	Robert Quinn	Paul Mousley & Gabbie Asher	7 June 2011	0.755 (Watch) 1.85 (ITV)
34	4	Episode 4 "The Prototype"	Robert Quinn	Helen Raynor	14 June 2011	0.650 (Watch) 1.59 (ITV)
35	5	Episode 5 "The End of the Future: Part 1"	Cilla Ware	Michael A. Walker	21 June 2011	0.477 (Watch) 1.79 (ITV)
36	6	Episode 6 "The End of the Future: Part 2"	Cilla Ware	Steve Bailie & Adrian Hodges	28 June 2011	0.496 (Watch) 1.38 (ITV)

== Webisodes (2010) ==
ITV released a series of 5 webisodes on 23 December 2010, 2–4 minutes long, written by Sarah Dollard, that provided background to the upcoming series 4.

Webisode No.	Episode	Directed by	Written by	Original release date
W1	Episode 1	Tim Bradley	Sarah Dollard	23 December 2010
Interview with James Lester and Captain Becker about the disappearance of team members (at the end of series 3). Introduction of Jess Parker as team coordinator with Matt Anderson and Phillip. Sarah Page's death is revealed.
W2	Episode 2	Tim Bradley	Sarah Dollard	23 December 2010
Becker arrives at the new ARC HQ. New team leader Matt Anderson is shown to have a secret agenda, reporting to "Gideon".
W3	Episode 3	Tim Bradley	Sarah Dollard	23 December 2010
Matt Anderson begins work at the ARC and meets the team.
W4	Episode 4	Tim Bradley	Sarah Dollard	23 December 2010
Matt addresses and impresses the newly formed ARC team.
W5	Episode 5	Tim Bradley	Sarah Dollard	23 December 2010
The team successfully deals with creature attacks. Matt reports to an impatient Gideon.
