= James Murray (English actor) =

English actor (born 1975)

James Murray MBE
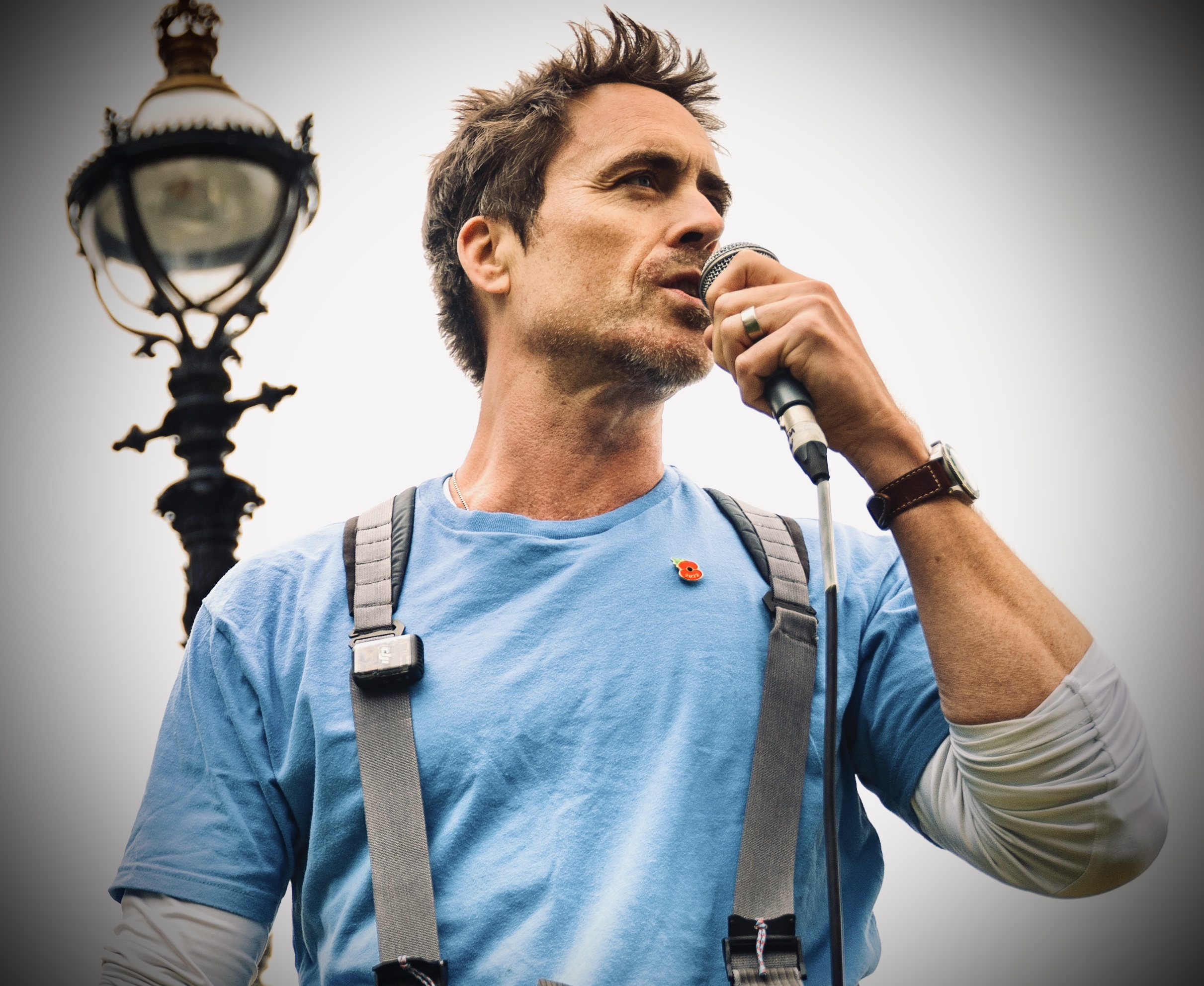
- At the March for Clean Water in London, 2024.
- Born: 22 January 1975 (age 51); Manchester, England
- Other name: Jim Murray
- Occupation: Actor
- Years active: 1998–present
- Spouse: Sarah Parish (m. 2007)
- Children: 2
- Website: https://jimmurray.art/

James Murray (born 22 January 1975) is an English actor, artist, and river conservationist. He is well known for his work campaigning for British rivers and is a wild salmon advocate. He currently holds the position of Deputy Chair for River Action, and founded Activist Anglers in 2023.

Murray and his wife, Sarah Parish, set up The Murray Parish Trust in 2014 in memory of their late daughter Ella-Jayne and have raised more than £5 million for paediatric facilities. They were both appointed MBE in the 2025 New Year Honours.

His television roles include Stephen Hart in Primeval (2007–2008), Niles Pottinger in Defiance (2014), Daniel Coltrane in Cucumber (2015), Chief Superintendent John Houseman in McDonald & Dodds (2020–2021), Prince Andrew, Duke of York in The Crown (2022–2023), and Colonel Neil "Chick" Harding in Masters of the Air (2024).

== Early life ==
Murray was born in Manchester. He was awarded a Classics scholarship by Malvern College, and has a degree in film. His great-grandfather, Richard Hollins Murray, invented the reflecting lens in 1927.

== Career ==
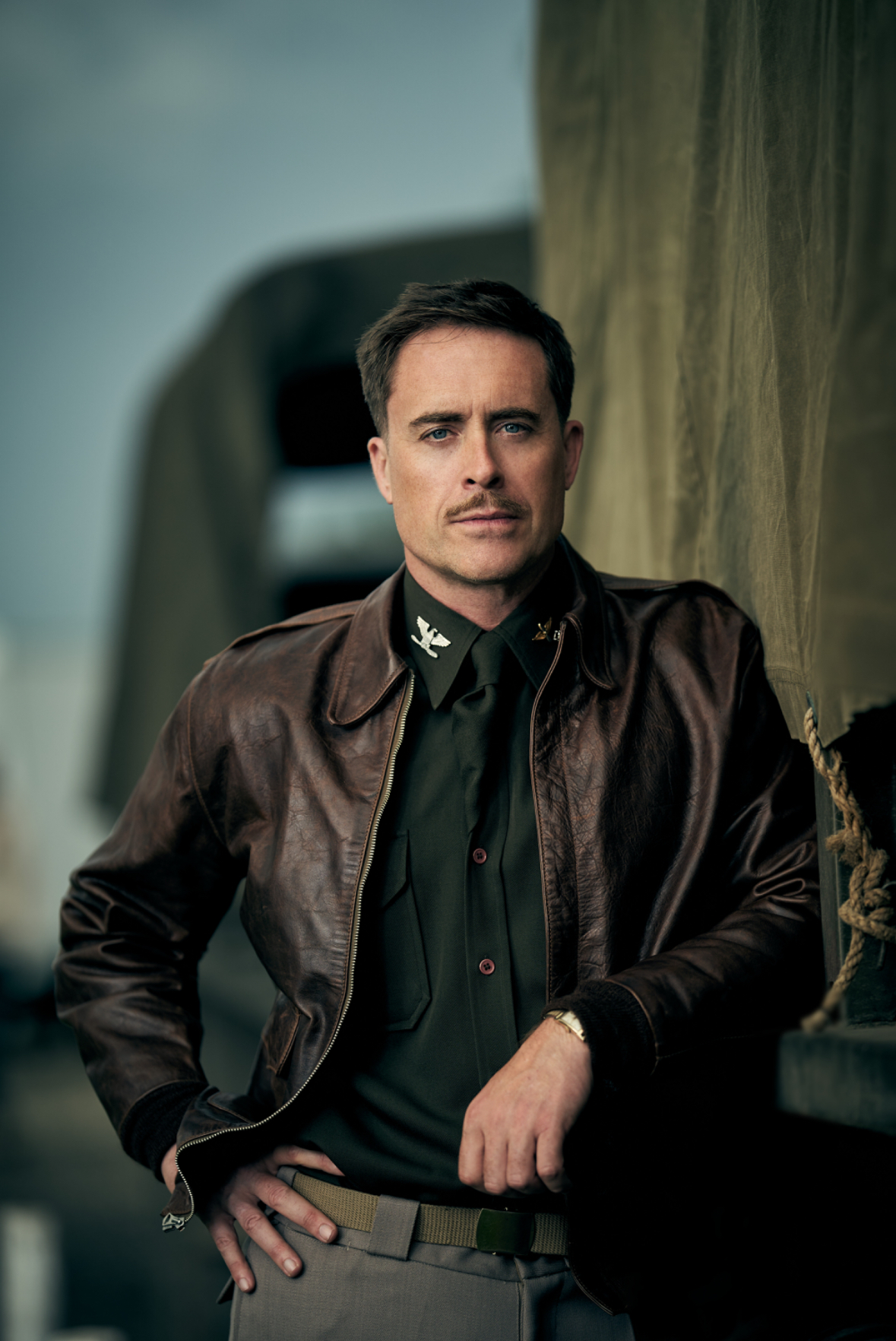
Murray in Masters of the Air

Murray's mainstream roles were in Primeval (ITV, 2008) as expert tracker Stephen Hart, and in Cucumber (Channel 4, 2015) as conflicted character Daniel Coltrane. Earlier on in his career he starred in a series of both film and television pieces, including the comedy series Roger Roger (1999), legal drama series North Square (2000), mini series Other People's Children (2000) and Sons & Lovers (2003), a Granada production of The Sittaford Mystery (2006) as Charles Burnaby, a film of the Thomas Hardy story Under the Greenwood Tree (2005) as Dick Dewy, plus earlier films Nailing Vienna (2002) as Peter, All the King's Men (1999) as Pvt Will Needham, and Phoenix Blue (2001) as Rick. He also found more permanent roles in Channel 4's 20 Things to Do Before You're 30 (2003) playing Glen and BBC One's season four of Cutting It (2005) as Liam Carney.

Murray appeared in the ITV science fiction series Primeval as Stephen Hart, Nick Cutter's lab technician, in both series one (2007) and series two (2008).

Murray had the leading role of the father, Frank Davis, in It's Alive (2008) a remake of the 1970s horror classic by Larry Cohen.

He had a role in Kröd Mändoon and the Flaming Sword of Fire, a comic fantasy series for Comedy Central and BBC Two, which began airing in April 2009. His character is Ralph Longshaft.

In the US, Murray was a lead in the CBS spy caper series CHAOS from 2010 to 2011. His character was called Billy Collins.

He was cast as Mayor Niles Pottinger, in the second series of Defiance, which first aired on 19 June 2014. Murray appeared in one episode ("Dead Air") of the third series which aired on 27 June 2015.

He took over from Fay Ripley as lead DCI in the completely improvised show Suspects as DCI Daniel Drummond, which aired in August 2016 (all six episodes).

He appeared as the father, Edward, in the three part ITV supernatural series HIM.

In 2016, Murray played The Doge of Venice in season 1 of Netflix's Medici, before playing the lead role of Wesley opposite Polly Walker in BBC One's Age Before Beauty.

In 2017, Murray directed veteran actor Robert Hardy in his last role alongside Nina Sosanya in his short film La Familia.

He appeared as Caleb in the Ryan Reynolds film 6 Underground released in December 2019. He was Chief Superintendent John Houseman in the ITV series McDonald & Dodds.

In 2021, Murray was cast as Colonel Neil "Chick" Harding in Apple TV's WW2 epic bomber drama Masters of the Air. The series is directed by Cary Joji Fukunaga and executive produced by Steven Spielberg and Tom Hanks. It premiered in 2024.

Murray directed and co-presented with Robson Green ITV's Robson and Jim's Icelandic Flyfishing Adventure (July 2021), a passion project about the therapeutic values of fly fishing set in the bountiful rivers in Iceland.

Murray played the role of Prince Andrew in the final two seasons of Netflix's The Crown.

== Personal life ==
Murray married his Cutting It co-star Sarah Parish in Hampshire on 15 December 2007, following a two-year romance. On 18 January 2008, it was announced that Parish was pregnant with their first child. Their daughter, Ella-Jayne, was born five weeks premature in May 2008 and died in January 2009 aged 8 months due to a congenital heart defect.

Their daughter Nell was born on 21 November 2009.

In honour of Ella-Jayne, Parish and Murray began raising funds for the Paediatric Intensive Care Unit at Southampton General Hospital, where she was cared for. Their efforts led to their creating the Murray Parish Trust in 2014, to enhance overall paediatric emergency care serving Southern England.

== Honours ==
Murray and his wife Sarah Parish were appointed MBE in the 2025 New Year Honours for services to "children with an illness and their families" through their charitable foundation, The Murray Parish Trust, and as patrons of Friends of Picu at Southampton Children's Hospital.

== Filmography ==
=== Film ===
Year	Title	Role	Notes
2000	Kevin & Perry Go Large	Candice's Adonis	
2001	Phoenix Blue	Rick	
2002	Nailing Vienna	Peter	
2009	It's Alive	Frank Davis	
2019	6 Underground	Caleb	
2024	Lee	Colonel Spencer	
2027	Narnia: The Magician's Nephew	TBA	Post-production

=== Television ===
Year	Title	Role	Notes
1998	Coronation Street	Sandy Hunter	5 episodes
1999	Roger Roger	Jason the Gardener	Episode: "Two Much Wine, Too Many Stars"
1999	All the King's Men	Pte. Will Needham	TV film
2000	Peak Practice	Marcus Johnson	Episode: "Turning Tides"
2000	Other People's Children	Lucas	Episode #1.3
2000	North Square	Johnny Boy	10 episodes
2002	Clocking Off	Mark Talbot	2 episodes
2002	Always and Everyone	Dr. Danny Barton	8 episodes
2003	Sons and Lovers	William Morel	TV film
2003	20 Thing's to Do Before You're 30	Glen	7 episodes
2003	Keen Eddie	Colin Kinney	Episode: "Eddie Loves Baseball"
2004–2005	Cutting It	Liam Carney	12 episodes
2005	Under the Greenwood Tree	Dick Dewy	TV film
2006	Agatha Christie's Marple: The Sittaford Mystery	Charles Burnaby	TV film
2007–2008	Primeval	Stephen Hart	13 episodes
2009	Kröd Mändoon and the Flaming Sword of Fire	Ralph Longshaft	4 episodes
2011	CHAOS	Billy Collins	Pilot and 12 episodes
2012	New Tricks	Luke Oswald	Episode: "Dead Poets"
2013	Death in Paradise	Ronnie Stuart	Episode: "A Dash of Sunshine"
2013	Midsomer Murders	Ollie Tabori	Episode: "A Christmas Haunting"
2014	Defiance	Niles Pottinger	Series 2; series 3, episode 3
2015	Cucumber	Daniel Coltrane	Series 1, 6 episodes
2016	Suspects	D.C.I. Daniel Drummond	Series 5, 6 episodes
2016	HIM	Edward	3 episodes
2016	Medici: Masters of Florence	Doge Foscari	Series 1, episode 5
2018	Age Before Beauty	Wesley	6 episodes)
2020–2021	McDonald & Dodds	Chief Superintendent John Houseman	3 episodes
2022–2023	The Crown	Prince Andrew, Duke of York	Supporting role (seasons 5–6)
2024	Masters of the Air	Colonel Neil "Chick" Harding	Miniseries
2024	Geek Girl	Mr. Fiennes	2 episodes
2026	Adultery	Paul	

== Awards and nominations ==
Year	Association	Category	Project	Result	Ref.
2024	Screen Actors Guild Awards	Outstanding Performance by an Ensemble in a Drama Series	The Crown	Nominated	
