= Drained (2024 film) =

2024 vampire film directed by Sean Cronin & Peter Stylianou

- Promotional release poster
- Directed by: Sean Cronin; Peter Stylianou
- Written by: Peter Stylianou
- Produced by: Sean Cronin; Peter Stylianou; Daniel Patrick Vaughan
- Starring: Ruaridh Aldington; Madalina Bellariu Ion; Angela Dixon; Craig Conway; Andrew-Lee Potts; Natasha patel; Andrew Lyle-Pinnock
- Cinematography: Daniel Patrick Vaughan
- Edited by: Peter Stylianou
- Production companies: House54; Magnificent Films; Red Guerilla Films
- Release dates: May 14, 2024 (Cannes); January 28, 2025 (United States)
- Country: United Kingdom
- Language: English

Drained is a 2024 British romance vampire film co-directed and produced by Sean Cronin and co-directed, written and produced by Peter Stylianou. It stars Ruaridh Aldington, Madalina Bellariu Ion, Angela Dixon, Craig Conway, Andrew-Lee Potts, Natasha Patel, Ayvianna Snow and Andrew Lyle-Pinnock. The film is about a jobless artist who falls in love with a mysterious woman.

== Plot ==
Thomas, a reclusive, disillusioned post-graduate concept artist in London, is trapped in a monotonous existence. He spends his days sketching dark imagery, often inspired by his nightmares. Still living with his overbearing mother, his life grows more unbearable when her domineering boyfriend, John, moves in. Their frequent shouting matches drive Thomas to leave home and rent a gloomy, damp flat in a crumbling part of the city, a setting that mirrors his internal decay.

One night, Thomas stumbles into a dimly lit jazz bar, where he meets Rhea, a hypnotically beautiful and distant woman. Her presence is magnetic, and their conversation flows with uncanny ease. Thomas brings her back to his flat, and they fall asleep on the couch. In the dead of night, he awakens to a strange, tingling pain. Rhea is silently feeding on his wrist. Her eyes glow faintly, and her mouth is smeared with blood. She licks the wound closed and calmly tells him it will heal. Terrified yet oddly exhilarated, Thomas does not resist.

Over the following days, Rhea returns, and Thomas allows her to feed again, this time more willingly. She tells him she can only take small amounts or risk damaging him permanently. But soon, the feeding sessions grow longer and more intense. He starts to crave the euphoric sensation of being drained, losing focus on art, friends, and even eating. He becomes pale, thin, and sickly, his body deteriorating as Rhea blossoms, glowing with vitality.

Rhea tells Thomas stories of her long life, being turned during the Victorian era, witnessing the world evolve while she remained unchanged, and the agony of needing others to survive. Despite this, her tone lacks remorse. In one chilling monologue, she describes draining an abusive nobleman dry over hours, slicing his skin with a bone comb so every pore bled. She calls it “therapeutic.”

John follows Thomas to his flat to bring him home. He bursts in one night while Rhea is there. Furious and disgusted, John strikes Thomas and demands that Rhea leave. Rhea responds by pinning him to the floor with unnatural strength, baring her fangs and gouging his throat with her teeth. Blood floods the floorboards, soaking into Thomas’s sketches. She drags John’s twitching body into the bathtub and slits his wrists to stage a suicide.

Thomas, already mentally fragile, is horrified, but part of him feels vindicated. Rhea comforts him and tells him John was always going to die, and now he’s free. When Thomas’s mother discovers John's death, she tries to get Thomas committed. Rhea intervenes again, but this time with more flair. One evening, as Thomas's mother prepares dinner, Rhea sneaks in and uses her fingernails to slash open her Achilles tendons. The older woman collapses, screaming. Rhea toys with her before biting her carotid artery and whispering, “You always tried to mold him into something hollow.” She leaves her sprawled across the kitchen, blood painting the linoleum like art.

Thomas is found catatonic next to the corpse and is committed to a psychiatric hospital. During his time there, he sees visions of Rhea, sometimes real, sometimes hallucinated, smiling at him from the corners of his padded cell. Upon his release, Thomas becomes obsessed with understanding what Rhea is, even sketching intricate diagrams of vampire anatomy, feeding rituals, and dreamlike murals of blood-slick lovers.

An investigating officer, Sergeant Kade, warns him to stop digging. One night, Kade reveals himself as a vampire and says there are others who do not tolerate Rhea’s recklessness. He offers a chilling warning, “You’re still food to most of us. Don’t forget your place.”

Despite the warning, Thomas tracks Rhea to an abandoned flat, where he finds her feeding on his old friend Dano, who is barely alive. The room is a bloodbath, walls smeared with frantic handprints, furniture overturned, Dano's body twitching as Rhea drinks from his inner thigh. She slices open her chest, exposing her still-beating heart.

Thomas kneels before her. As she dies, he carves out her heart with a broken shard of mirror and consumes it raw. His screams echo through the building as the transformation begins: veins blackening, eyes dilating, senses exploding. By the time the authorities arrive, the flat is empty. Only bloodstains remain.

The final scene shows Thomas, now clean, confident, and sharply dressed, watching a young couple from across a café window, and he smiles.

== Cast ==
- Ruaridh Aldington as Thomas
- Madalina Bellariu Ion as Rhea
- Angela Dixon
- Craig Conway
- Andrew-Lee Potts
- Natasha patel
- Andrew Lyle-Pinnock
- Timothy Blore
- Kenton Lloyd Morgan
- Ayvianna Snow
- Diana Yekinni

== Production ==
The film was co-directed and produced by Sean Cronin and Peter Stylianou by the screenplay of Stylianou. It was filmed in London, England under Magnificent Films, House 54 and Red Guerilla Films. Additional producers include Daniel Patrick Vaughan and Tony Currier. Special makeup effects are by Francesca Reidie, with Ellie Campbell handling production design and cinematography by Daniel Patrick Vaughan.

== Release ==
The film was premiered at Cannes Film Festival on May 14-25, 2024. It also screened at Screamfest Horror Film Festival on October 8-17, 2024.

The film is released in VOD at US and Canada on January 28, 2025 via Level 33 Entertainment, in UK on February 11, 2025, and also available on Fandango at Home, Apple TV, Amazon Prime Video and Hoopla.

== Reception ==
Chris Catt of Creepy Catalog gave the film a positive review and a rating of 4 out of 5, and he wrote: Drained is one of the best indie films released in the United States during the first month of 2025, so if you haven’t seen it already, put it near the top of your list now.

Matthew Orozco of Macabre Daily gave the film a positive review, and he said that: “Drained” is a sexy and stylized addition to the vampire genre that toys with tired tropes while introducing new metaphors that serve to expand the utility of the sub-genre and those bloodsucking freaks we all love!
