= Leapin' Lizards =

Leapin' Lizards may refer to:

- "Leapin' lizards!", a catchphrase from the comic strip Little Orphan Annie
- "Leapin' Lizards" (CSI), an episode of CSI: Crime Scene Investigation
- "Leapin' Lizards" (Frasier) an episode of Frasier
- "Leapin' Lizards" (Primeval), a 2007 television episode
