= Primeval series 2 =

2008 series of British sci-fi programme

Primeval
- Series 2
- DVD box set cover art
- Starring: Douglas Henshall; James Murray; Andrew-Lee Potts; Lucy Brown; Hannah Spearritt; Juliet Aubrey; Ben Miller; Karl Theobald; Naomi Bentley
- No. of episodes: 7

Release
- Original network: ITV
- Original release: 12 January – 23 February 2008

Series chronology
- ← Previous; Series 1 Next → Series 3

The second series of the British science fiction programme Primeval began on 12 January 2008 and concluded on 23 February 2008 after airing seven episodes. Primeval follows a team of scientists tasked with investigating the appearance of temporal anomalies across the United Kingdom through which prehistoric and futuristic creatures enter the present. Most of the main cast from the first series returned for the second; the cast was also expanded with the additions of characters played by Karl Theobald and Naomi Bentley.

Following the success of the first series, the second series of Primeval was commissioned in March 2007, with storylines and scripts being worked on for three months before shooting began in June. The second series was envisioned as more ambitious than the first, with more creatures and more action sequences, and was also written to be rougher, with more people being killed by the various creatures. The second series also introduced the Anomaly Research Centre (ARC), created using a massive set in a building formerly for military use at Longcross Film Studios in Chertsey.

The second series replicated the success of the first in terms of ratings, being seen by over six million viewers in the United Kingdom. Reception was overall positive; critics enjoyed that it did not take itself too seriously and found the second series to be both entertaining and overall an improvement over the first in terms of its central story arc. The last two episodes of the series received particular praise as a hard-edged and surprisingly good series finale. The visual effects received a more mixed response than in the previous series; some critics found them to be an improvement whereas others considered them worse than in the first series.

== Episodes ==
| No. overall | No. in series | Episode | Directed by | Written by | Original release date | UK viewers (millions) |
|---|---|---|---|---|---|---|
| 7 | 1 | Episode 1 "Jurassic Mall" | Jamie Payne | Adrian Hodges | 12 January 2008 | 6.32 |
As Nick Cutter tries to come to terms with Claudia Brown's disappearance, he struggles to adjust to working with her replacement, the slimy Oliver Leek. Meanwhile, bloodthirsty Velociraptors are rampaging through a shopping mall and the team are called in to deal with the situation. When the team arrives back at the ARC, they are introduced to Jenny Lewis, the ARC's new PR officer, and a doppelgänger of Claudia Brown.
| 8 | 2 | Episode 2 "Mealworms, Indeed" | Andrew Gunn | Adrian Hodges | 19 January 2008 | 6.05 |
Cutter and his team find themselves pursuing giant, carnivorous worms from the Precambrian that start to appear through an eerie fog in a local office block after emerging through another anomaly. As the team deals with the problem, Cutter becomes preoccupied with the team's new PR executive, Jenny Lewis, whom he is convinced is actually Claudia Brown.
| 9 | 3 | Episode 3 "Catfight" | Jamie Payne | Richard Kurti and Bev Doyle | 26 January 2008 | 6.27 |
Connor's new anomaly detector is set up in the ARC, but there are fears that the device will not work when another violent attack is reported at Blue Sky amusement park. Investigations lead the team to deduce the attacks took place before the detector came online. The team discover a Smilodon is roaming the park, killing at will, but as their hunt continues, they begin to suspect someone knows of the creature's presence and is covering up for it.
| 10 | 4 | Episode 4 "Underwater Menace" | Jamie Payne | Cameron McAllister | 2 February 2008 | 6.39 |
After a teenager mysteriously disappears, the team investigate, and narrowly save Jenny from death at the jaws of a highly unusual shark lurking in the River Thames. Cutter is convinced that the shark's unique morphology is the result of further evolution – that it's a species from the future. They then split up to find the creature's lair but trouble brews when Abby Maitland is dragged through an anomaly by another carnivorous species from the future: the Mer.
| 11 | 5 | Episode 5 "Silurian Sands" | Andrew Gunn | Ben Court and Caroline Ip | 9 February 2008 | 6.33 |
A young girl searching for her dog ends up stuck on the other side of an anomaly, leading Cutter and Stephen Hart to mount a rescue mission into the sandy deserts of the Silurian. But when the anomaly closes, the trio end up trapped with a horde of giant Silurian scorpions which track them from hearing vibrations in the sand. As the three of them fight for survival, Cutter realises they are not alone: someone is actively trying to sabotage their work.
| 12 | 6 | Episode 6 "Traitor Revealed" | Nick Murphy | Paul Cornell | 16 February 2008 | 6.44 |
A Columbian mammoth slips through an anomaly, rampaging along the M25 scattering cars and lorries in its wake. As Cutter, Abby, Connor Temple and Jenny take on the task of stopping it, Stephen is shocked when Helen Cutter returns with plans of her own. After taking the mammoth back to the ARC, Cutter decides to set a trap to root out the traitor in their midst, leaving Lester to fight for his life against a future predator that has infiltrated the ARC.
| 13 | 7 | Episode 7 "Concrete Menagerie" | Nick Murphy | Adrian Hodges | 23 February 2008 | 6.20 |
Cutter and the team are kidnapped and held in a military bunker by Oliver Leek, who has plans to be the most powerful man in the world using an army of fearsome predators he has captured from past anomalies, while his partner, Helen, furthers her own nefarious schemes. As the team fight for their survival, Stephen deals with a Silurian scorpion which Leek has unleashed onto a busy beach. Back at the bunker, the team find a way to stop Leek, but at the cost of Stephen's life.

== Cast ==
=== Main cast ===
- Douglas Henshall as Nick Cutter
- James Murray as Stephen Hart
- Andrew-Lee Potts as Connor Temple
- Lucy Brown as Jenny Lewis
- Hannah Spearritt as Abby Maitland
- Juliet Aubrey as Helen Cutter
- Ben Miller as James Lester
- Karl Theobald as Oliver Leek
- Naomi Bentley as Caroline Steel

=== Guest cast ===
- Tim Faraday as The Cleaner
- Simon Naylor as Security Guard 1
- Anthony Adjekum as Security Guard 2
- Martin Miller as Duty Manager
- Scott Hazell as Boy 1
- James Bellamy as Boy 2
- Jason Thorpe as Terry
- Ruth Millar as Shelley
- Togo Igawa as Mr. Nagata
- Ged Simmons as Fireman Armstrong
- Shelley Minto as Fireman Cooper
- Sidney Cole as Fire Chief
- Rupert Young as Mike
- Eloise Joseph as Young Woman 1
- Ashley Mulheron as Young Woman 2
- Thomas Aldridge as Warren
- Gillian Kearney as Valerie Irwin
- Rick Warden as Peter Campbell
- Heather McHale as Mother
- Ian Ralph as Mr. West
- Rory MacGregor as Kenny Johnson
- John Henry Keating as Mechanic
- Jacob Anderson as Lucien Hope
- Loick Essien as Basketball Player
- Chris Nayak as ARC Technician
- Drew Edwards as Mini-Sub Operator
- Mabel Rogers as Taylor
- Jay Simpson as Steve
- Bill Hurst as Mercenary 1
- Errol Clarke as Mercenary 2
- Susan Salmon as Dina
- Reuben Lee as Jake
- Ramon Tikaram as Mick
- Claire Spence as Lorraine Wickes
- Robin Pirongs as Father on Beach
- Elliot James Langridge as Youth on Beach

== Production ==
=== Development and writing ===
Following the success of the first series, Primeval was recommissioned for a second series in March 2007. The second series was written to be more ambitious than the first, with more creatures and more action sequences. The series was also written with a rougher attitude, with more people being killed by creatures than in the first. The first series of Primeval had not used any dinosaurs at all but dinosaurs were introduced in the second, beginning with dromaeosaurs in the first episode. Nearly all of the main cast of the first series of Primeval returned for the second. Given that the production team saw it as important to also introduce new characters to keep the series fresh and exciting, they were joined by new additions Karl Theobald and Naomi Bentley. The writing of the second series was also intended to emphasise a stronger team feel between the different characters. Naomi Bentley, who plays Caroline Steel, a romantic interest of Connor Temple (Andrew-Lee Potts), was cast as someone who was "out of Connor's league". Karl Theobald's Oliver Leek was envisioned as James Lester's (Ben Miller) ambitious and sinister assistant.

James Murray's Stephan Hart was written to be subtly alienated from the rest of the team following the revelation early in the second series that he has had an affair with Nick Cutter's (Douglas Henshall) wife Helen (Juliet Aubrey). In later interviews, Murray suggested that the affair may not have happened in the original timeline, only existing as a result of the inadvertent changes to the timeline at the end of the first series.

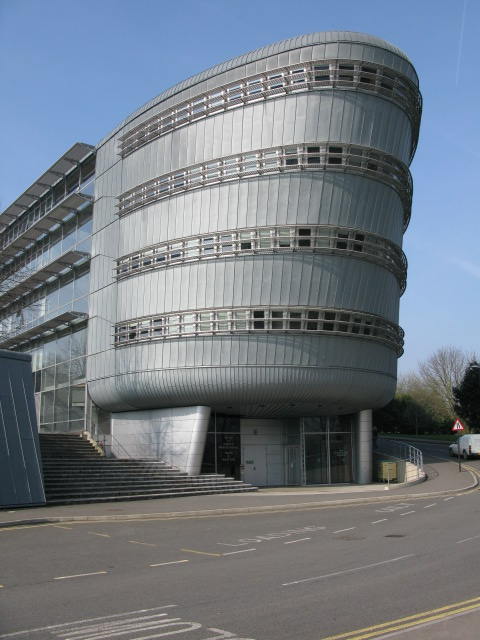
The Duke of Kent Building seen in the show as the exterior of the Anomaly Research Centre.

In order for Lucy Brown to portray Jenny Lewis, she had to be made to look quite different from the character she played in the first series (Claudia Brown); Jenny wore more contrasting colors, had her hair up and had more full-on makeup. To portray Lewis, Brown spoke with some of her old friends who worked in PR. Given that Jenny was higher up in the hierarchy, Brown also portrayed her as more confident and more in her element.

=== Visual effects ===
As for the first series, the visual effects of the second series of Primeval were produced by the London-based visual effects company Framestore. Following lessons learnt during the production of the first series, the effects team for the second series made an effort to match the creatures better with the reactions and eyelines of the actors better. The second series also used much fewer animatronics than the first, with nearly everything being CGI.

=== Filming ===
The second series of Primeval was filmed mostly in and around London. Shooting began in June 2007 and wrapped in September. The second series introduced the Anomaly Research Centre (ARC). The interior shots of the ARC were shot at the Building 64/63 at Longcross Film Studios in Chertsey. The building, originally used for military testing purposes, was seen by production designer Paul Cross, who thought it would be great to shoot in. In order to be able to use the whole building and to leave the impression that it was sunk into the ground, its windows were covered up. The exterior for the ARC is the Duke of Kent Building on the Stag Hill Campus at the University of Surrey. The first episode, featuring dromaeosaurs in a shopping mall, was filmed primarily in Bentall Centre, Kingston upon Thames. There was also location shooting at Fuerteventura in the Canary Islands for the future world seen in the fourth episode and for the desert seen in the fifth episode. The fourth episode was partly filmed in Canary Wharf. Footage was also shot at the Battersea Power Station.

== Release ==
=== Broadcast and ratings ===
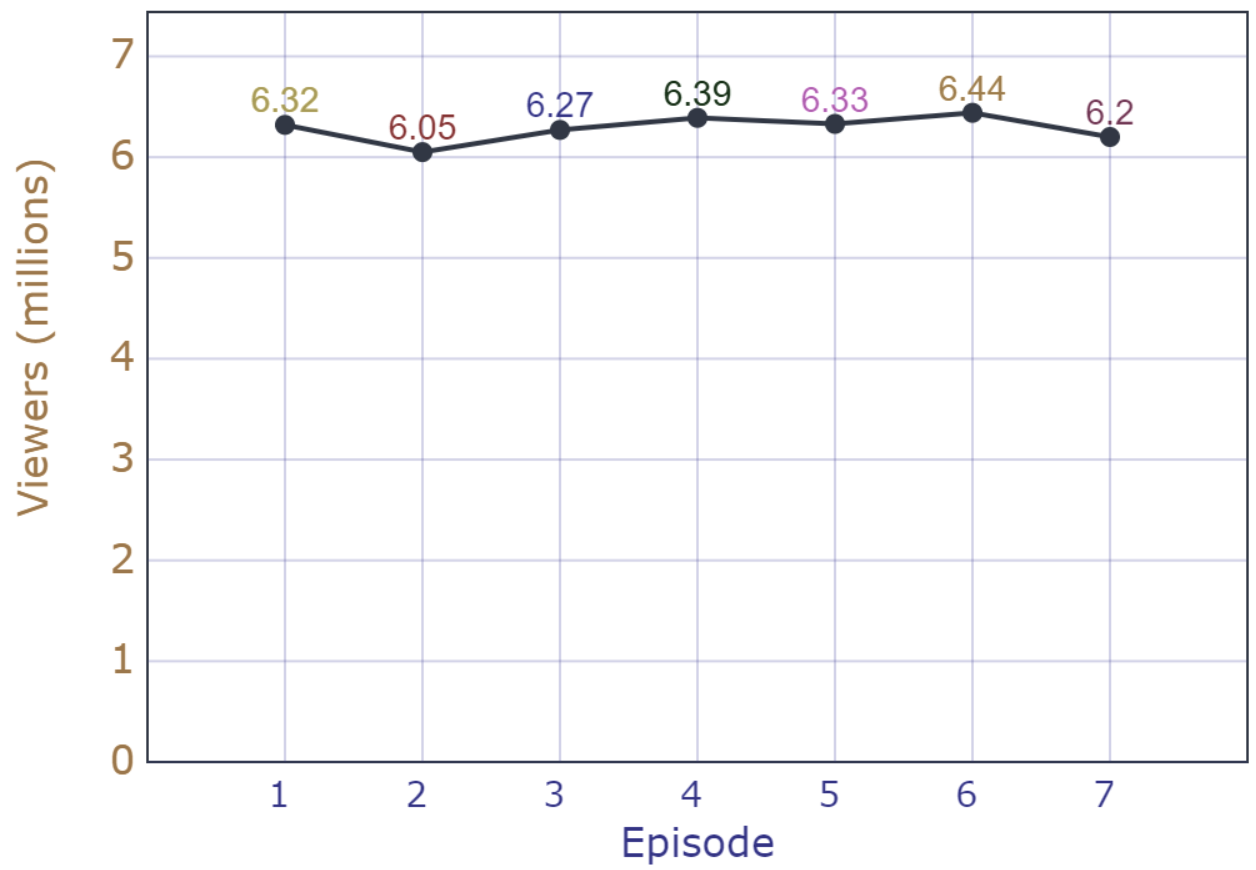
UK ratings for the episodes of the second series

The production of the second series was announced by ITV on 8 June 2007. The second series had a much larger pre-publicity campaign, both by ITV and by unaffilited TV magazines. The series consistently received more than six million viewers, roughly on par with the first series, and had an audience share of over 25%. The least viewed episode was the second episode, with 6.05 million viewers, and the most viewed episode was the penultimate episode, with 6.44 million viewers.

=== Home media ===
The DVD release of the second series included the 40-minute behind-the-scenes documentary Through the Anomaly, presented and created by Andrew-Lee Potts.

| DVD title | Number and duration of episodes | Release date |
|---|---|---|
| Primeval: The Complete Series Two | 7 x 45 min. | 17 March 2008 |
| Primeval: The Complete Series One & Two | 13 x 45 min. | 17 March 2008 |
| Primeval: Series One - Three | 23 x 45 min. | 1 June 2009 |
| Primeval: The Complete Series One - Five | 36 x 45 min. | 7 November 2011 |

== Critical reception ==
Eamonn McCusker of The Digital Fix gave the second series of Primeval a cautiously positive review, finding some of the situations to require suspension of disbelief but overall finding the series to be enjoyable and its story arc to be an improvement over the first series. McCusker praised the final two episodes as an entertaining and satisfying conclusion to the series. McCusker felt that although Juliet Aubrey, Lucy Brown and Ben Miller all "[did] their part", it was Douglas Henshall who carried the series and that he was perhaps "too good for this material". McCusker was also positive towards the CGI of the series, finding most of it to be "slightly better" than the first series, in particular the Smilodon, but finding the Mer-creatures of the fourth episodes to be "the least well-realised" creatures of the series.

Robert McLaughlin of Den of Geek reviewed each episode individually; although he found the scripts to be "formulaic" and the CGI to be "average", looking cheaper and as if less time had been spent on them than in the previous series, he ultimately gave Primeval as a whole a positive review, noting that "it never pretends to be anything it isn't" and that it was "unashamedly entertaining". McLaughlin concluded that Primeval would never be able to compete with American science fiction series and that "it's not able to hold a candle to Doctor Who" but that it was also "infinitely better" than the contemporary Robin Hood TV series. McLaughlin especially praised the final two episodes, which he found to be "surprisingly good", but gave the third episode a negative review due to the CGI of the Smilodon, which he thought was "an embarrassment".

Paul Simpson of Sci-Fi Bulletin also reviewed each episode individually and praised the second series, giving all episodes a score of 8/10, except for the fourth episode, which he gave 9/10 as the "best of the show to date". Simpson found the script of the second series to be "as sharp" as in the first series and praised Primeval's ability to take "other genre ideas and give them its own spin", noticing homages to films such as Tremors and Jaws. Simpson also praised the character interactions and character development of the second series, finding many of the characters to have been more fleshed out and finding them to be "well played" by the actors.

Another episode-by-episode reviewer was Rob Buckley of The Medium is not Enough, who thought that Primeval overall "wasn't bad" and "far less up its own arse than most of the new [Doctor] Who has been" and "more mature than new Who and Torchwood". Buckley did not enjoy the second episode, although he felt it was "not a complete waste of an hour". After finding the first four episodes to be "threading water", Buckley thought the series improved with the fifth episode, which he found to be "very good", and he enjoyed the two-part finale, stating that it was "certainly a bit harder edged than your normal Primeval". Buckley criticised the CGI of the Smilodon in the third episode and also complained that Caroline Steel, Primeval's first non-white main character, turned out to be a spy and an antagonist.
