= Barun Rai and the House on the Cliff =

- Official release poster
- Directed by: Sam Bhattacharjee
- Written by: Sara Bodinar
- Screenplay by: Sudhanshu Dube; Mitch Wicking
- Produced by: Sam Bhattacharjee; Mitra Bhattacharya; Firuzi Khan
- Starring: Priyanshu Chatterjee; Nyra Banerjee; Sid Makkar; David Bailie
- Cinematography: John Raggett
- Music by: Sohail Sen
- Production companies: Unicorn Motion Pictures; Big Films Media
- Distributed by: Do it Creative (UK)
- Release dates: 29 October 2021 (United Kingdom); December 2021 (India)
- Running time: 120 minutes
- Countries: India; United Kingdom
- Language: English

Barun Rai and The House on the Cliff is a paranormal, psychological horror thriller film directed by Sam Bhattacharjee and produced by Sam Bhattacharjee, Mitra Bhattacharya and Firuzi Khan. It stars Priyanshu Chatterjee, Nyra Banerjee, Sid Makkar, David Bailie, Tony Richardson and Ayvianna Snow. The film was produced by Unicorn Motion Pictures and was released under the banner of Big Films Media. The film was released on 29 October 2021, in the United Kingdom.

== Plot ==
The film is set in the 1970s and shot in Little Tawney Hall, Romford and Cornwall, England. The film revolves around a parapsychologist detective named Barun Rai, who can see what the normal eye cannot, using his powers to investigate crimes of a paranormal nature. It portrays the story of newlyweds Harmesh and Soumili, who move into their dream house, unaware of the spate of mysterious suicides disturbing the area and local police.

== Cast ==
- Priyanshu Chatterjee as Barun Rai
- Nyra Banerjee as Soumili
- Sid Makkar as Harmesh
- George Dawson as Brian
- Tony Richardson as Father Paul
- Aakash Shukal as Sukhbir
- Ayvianna Snow as Polly
- Adam Day as Reporter
- Mirabel Stuart as Camilla
- Emma Galliano as Inspector Jenny Jones
- David Bailie as Mentor
- Debbie Bird as Brian's mum

== Production ==
The film's shooting took place at locations in the United Kingdom such as Southampton, Camden, Cheshunt, North Weald, Stapleford Tawney, and Hackney, London.

== Release ==
The film was released on 29 October 2021, in the United Kingdom and scheduled to be released in December 2021 in India.
