= Take Cover (film) =

- Directed by: Nick McKinless
- Screenplay by: Joshua Todd James
- Produced by: Ben Jacques; Melissa Massey
- Starring: Scott Adkins; Alice Eve; Jack Parr; Madalina Bellariu Ion; Nik Goldman
- Cinematography: Rick Joaquim
- Edited by: Liviu Jipescu
- Production company: Signature Entertainment
- Distributed by: Signature Entertainment
- Release dates: 4 October 2024 (United States); 14 October 2024 (United Kingdom)
- Running time: 90 minutes
- Country: United Kingdom
- Language: English

Take Cover is a 2024 British action thriller film directed by Nick McKinless and starring Scott Adkins and Alice Eve. The plot follows a professional sniper trapped in an all-glass penthouse apartment by a deadly rival.

The film was a global streaming hit, a top ten film on Hulu and #1 on the Paramount+ worldwide top 10.

== Plot ==
Sam, a sniper, and Ken, a spotter are watching their high profile target. Sam finds a perfect shot, but accidentally hits the girlfriend of the target as well. Sam is regretful, believing that the girl he killed may have been innocent and seemed to be protecting the target.

Sam decides to retire and talks to his boss, Tamara, about it. She convinces him to take one last assignment in Frankfurt and Sam agrees. They enter a luxurious apartment and are told it is an upgrade from Tamara herself, seen as a parting gift for Sam while Ken remains in disbelief. Two massage girls, Mona and Lily, join them as a gift from the boss.

The manager brings up food and suddenly opens the curtains, and a sniper begins firing. He tries to close the curtains, but the manager stops him and tries to kill him. Sam manages to knock him and another assassin down. Ken makes a call to Tamara using Lily's phone and asks for backup. The assassin wakes up again, but Ken throws him out of the window. However, he is shot and heavily injured by the sniper.

Sam finds that Tamara is trying to kill them because she fears Sam using his skills for another employer. In a chaotic skirmish, Lily is killed. Once reinforcements arrive, Sam uses his rifle and several other tactics to keep himself and Mona alive despite the low chances of survival. Mona makes Sam promise to take care of her 8 year old daughter and sacrifices herself as he finally kills the sniper. Ken suddenly wakes up but forces Sam to save himself after realizing he is on borrowed time. While a drone sent by Tamara is destroyed by Sam, Ken uses the last of his energy to help Sam before succumbing to his wounds. Using an old technique from their past, Sam escapes the attack.

With the help of Mona's daughter, Sam kills Tamara in the restroom at a train station.

== Cast ==
- Scott Adkins as Sam Lorde
- Alice Eve as Tamara
- Jack Parr as Ken
- Madalina Bellariu Ion as Mona
- Alba De Torrebruna as Lily
- Billy Clements as Assassin (cameo)
- Ada Michaels-Mason as The Blonde (cameo)

== Production ==
Principal photography started June 19, 2023 in England.

== Release ==
Take Cover was released in select US theaters and on VOD on October 4, 2024. It was released in the UK and Ireland on October 14, 2024.

== Reception ==
Filmhounds rated it as a 4/5 movie and said "You could argue there's almost no one better to helm an action film with awesome fight scenes than someone who has been working in stunts for years. Director Nick Mckinless (Fast X, Gangs of London) has some amazing credentials and the action sequences in Take Cover are clearly choreographed by someone who knows and loves the genre' and ' Look out for one particularly spectacular scene between Adkins and an aggressor in an elevator. Brilliant stuff."

Gazettely also scored it as a 4/5 and said "McKinless keeps the thrills flowing skillfully despite constraints of setting and budget. By the climactic conclusion, you’ll be on the edge of your seat cheering these battle-worn heroes on. Take Cover may not reinvent the genre but delivers non-stop entertainment through old-school action fundamentals. Fans of the lean and mean DTV style will find this a consummate example of the form."

Fortress-Of-Solitude stated "There’s no disputing that Take Cover delivers on what it promises. It hardly stops to catch its breath and unleashes a busting dose of action and excitement for an hour and a half. Much like Scott Adkins’ Sam, it’s clean, efficient, and hits the mark."

Nerdly scored it a 3.5/5 and said "Overall, Take Cover is an enjoyable action film that should lead to more director’s gigs for McKinless. The cast do well despite some clunky, and familiar, dialogue about God, government and morality popping up during the film’s early stages and occasional lulls in the action. While it doesn’t get any points for originality, it does get more than enough for the mayhem it puts on the screen to more than make up for it."

Eye-For-Film also gave it a 3.5/5 score and said "Though it is by no means deep, and some aspects of it are so knowingly cheesy as to be comedic, Take Cover is nicely put together and a lot of fun to watch."

AV-Forums rated it at 7/10, stating that "Take Cover is hardly game-changing, but it's a very solid concept-driven single-location affair that makes the most of Adkins' prowess without exceeding the reach of its stylish-but-minimalist budget-driven approach. It's a pretty impressively slick directorial debut from stuntman Nick McKinless, who clearly knows how to stage action."

The Guardian rated Take Cover at 2/5 stars, providing a mixed review, writing that it was not "astute enough to methodically work the stripped-down predicament for everything it’s worth. Surely no elite sniper would give his position away with a lens flash, for starters – and why are the characters all hiding behind furniture that is presumably easy to penetrate with high velocity bullets?"

Common Sense Media was critical of its unoriginal premise, stating "What the movie can't deliver, however, is a break from the familiar "one last job" cliches, or a climax packed with any surprises."

Cinema Crazed was more favorable, calling it "decent Scott Adkins fare, an action film with plenty of bullets and hand to hand combat, made to showcase what the actor can do and going for it while it’s at it."
