= Bogieville =

2024 horror film by Sean Cronin

- Official release poster
- Directed by: Sean Cronin
- Written by: Henry P. Gravelle
- Produced by: Djonny Chen; Sean Cronin
- Starring: Arifin Putra; Eloise Lovell Anderson; Sean Cronin; Daniel P. Lewis
- Cinematography: Daniel patrick Vaughan
- Edited by: Pj Harling; Will Simpson
- Music by: Archie Benton; Guy Dagul
- Production companies: Magnificent Films; Silent D Pictures; Instant Entertainment
- Release dates: May 14, 2024 (Cannes); June 3, 2025 (United States)
- Running time: 108 minutes
- Country: United States
- Language: English
- Budget: $200,000

Bogieville is a 2024 American horror film written by Henry P. Gravelle and directed by Sean Cronin. It stars Arifin Putra, Eloise Lovell Anderson, Sean Cronin and Daniel P. Lewis. The film is about a young couple that are on the run across trailer park Bogieville.

== Synopsis ==
A young couple on the run come across a derelict trailer park, BOGIEVILLE. Convinced to stay by the sinister caretaker 'Crawford' they soon learn that he is a guardian to the residents of Bogieville, a pack of Vampires headed by the formidable Madison.

== Cast ==
- Arifin Putra as Ham
- Eloise Lovell Anderson as Jody
- Sean Cronin as Madison
- Daniel P. Lewis as Sheriff Jim Barry
- Jonathan Hansler as Crawford
- Sarina Taylor as Tess
- Angela Dixon as Doctor Carol Mills
- Poppy Jae Hughes as Lily
- Alex Reece as Deputy
- Natalie Hopkins as Deputy Sheriff Pickering
- Darren Tassell as Deputy Jamison
- Joe Riley as Deputy
- Nino Fernandez as Deputy
- Rico Morris as Deputy Davis
- Ryan Livingstone as Nick
- Fredi 'Kruga' Nwaka as Sergeant
- Julian Gamm as Billy Cupps
- Mollie Hindle as Billy Cupps Wife
- Polly Fey as Creature
- Glenn Salvage as Creature
- Andrew-Lee Potts as John
- Katie Sheridan as Cathy
- Otilia de Royer as Jesse
- Sandra Alexandra Marks as Gail
- Louis James as Mel
- Sophie Rankin as Betsy
- Ayvianna Snow as Mary
- Dan Robins as EMT Paul Matthews
- Richard Dee-Roberts as Reverend Michael
- Mark Beauchamp as Vigilante
- Ash Valley as Cody
- Melly Myers as Bella
- Toby Sauerback as Vigilante
- Ellis India as Melinda
- Frazer Brown as Patient
- Paige Alexandra as Cladia
- Nicholas Brown as Railway Worker
- Henry Thompson as Dudley
- Ann Wainaina as Creature

== Production ==
Tequila Carter provided the special effects, while Steve Askey handled the VFX.

Cronin says;

"One of the most bizarre things in directing Bogieville was doing it often in full makeup. Of the forty-day shoot, I think I was in full vampire regalia, with blackout lenses and fangs, for about half of it, which posed a challenge in both vision and speech. The other challenge for the production, and something we worked hard to do, was to faithfully recreate the look and feel of a small rural town in the deep south of the United States, but in Surrey, England, where it was freezing cold and spent most of the shoot pissing down rain. Our production designer, Abbie Cornwell, did an incredible job, however, as did the entire cast and crew, and I’m quite looking forward to unleashing Bogieville onto the world. It’s a wild, scary ride."

LevelK and Brick Lane Entertainment has the rights of the film for North American distribution.

== Release ==
The film premiered at the Cannes Film Festival on May 14, 2024. It also premiered at FrightFest on August 25, 2024.

The film hit premium VOD in North America on June 3, 2025 via Level 33 Entertainment, also released in UK on June 9, 2025 via Trinity Creative Partnership. The film is available on Amazon Prime Video, Apple TV, Fandango at Home, Sky Store.

== Reception ==
Kat Hughes of The Hollywood News gave the film a rating of 3/5 and she wrote: An interesting take on the vampire film, Bogieville is very much not the film it would lead you to believe, the result being a mixed bag of peaks and troughs.

Leslie Felperin of The Guardian gave the film a negative review and a rating of 2 out of 5 stars and wrote: A cheap as chips but not unamusing farrago.

Matthew Orozco of Macabre Daily gave the film a positive feedback and he wrote: “Bogieville” is a country-fried vampire romp that delivers a grizzly vampire design complemented by some outstanding practical effects and production design. The story isn’t as straightforward as it could’ve been, but fans of bloodsucking creatures of the night will enjoy this addition to the blossoming Southern Vampire genre!

Chris Catt of Creepy Catalog gave the film a negative review and a 2 out of 5 rating and he said: Bogieville is only recommended for fans of slower-paced vampire movies, and for people who enjoy bizarre “Southern” accents.
