= Love Actually =

2003 film by Richard Curtis

- Theatrical release poster
- Directed by: Richard Curtis
- Written by: Richard Curtis
- Produced by: Duncan Kenworthy; Tim Bevan; Eric Fellner; Debra Hayward; Liza Chasin
- Starring: Hugh Grant; Liam Neeson; Colin Firth; Laura Linney; Emma Thompson; Alan Rickman; Keira Knightley; Martine McCutcheon; Bill Nighy; Rowan Atkinson; Thomas Brodie-Sangster
- Cinematography: Michael Coulter
- Edited by: Nick Moore
- Music by: Craig Armstrong
- Production companies: StudioCanal; Working Title Films; DNA Films
- Distributed by: Universal Pictures (International); Mars Distribution (France)
- Release dates: 14 November 2003 (United States); 21 November 2003 (United Kingdom); 3 December 2003 (France)
- Running time: 135 minutes
- Countries: United Kingdom; United States; France
- Language: English
- Budget: $40-45 million
- Box office: $252.6 million

Love Actually is a 2003 Christmas romantic comedy film written and directed by Richard Curtis. The film features an ensemble cast, composed predominantly of British actors, many of whom had worked with Curtis in previous projects. An international co-production of the United Kingdom, United States and France, it was mostly filmed on location in London. The film delves into different aspects of love as shown through nine separate stories involving a variety of individuals, many of whom are interlinked as the plot progresses. The story begins five weeks before Christmas and is played out in a weekly countdown until the holiday, followed by an epilogue that takes place in the New Year.

The film, Curtis's first as director, was released in the US on 14 November 2003 and a week later in the UK during its theatrical run. Love Actually was a box-office success, grossing $252.6 million worldwide on a budget of $40–45 million. The film received mixed reviews and a nomination for the Golden Globe Award for Best Motion Picture – Musical or Comedy. It later developed a cult following, and is often a staple film shown during the Christmas period in both the United Kingdom and United States. A made-for-television short sequel, Red Nose Day Actually, aired in two different versions on BBC One and NBC in 2017, as part of the fundraising event Red Nose Day 2017.

== Plot ==
David, the British Prime Minister, reflects that despite global conflict and tragedy, love can often be seen in everyday life, recalling scenes of affection at the arrivals gate of London Heathrow Airport. The film then follows several interconnected stories about love in the weeks leading up to Christmas.

Aging rock star Billy Mack records a novelty Christmas version of the song "Love Is All Around" with the help of his long-time manager Joe. Although he openly mocks the single during promotional appearances, the song unexpectedly becomes the UK's Christmas number-one. On Christmas Day, Billy realises that Joe has been the most important person in his life and chooses to spend the holiday celebrating quietly with him instead of attending a celebrity party.

Juliet and Peter have a joyous wedding organised by Peter's best friend Mark, who acts aloofly towards Juliet. Later, when Juliet forces Mark to show her the wedding video he made, she realises it focuses almost entirely on her. Later, Mark knocks on her door and, telling her he knows he will get nothing in return, confesses his feelings silently through a display of cue cards. Juliet shows her appreciation by kissing him briefly and returns to her husband. Mark tells himself that he can now move forward.

Writer Jamie discovers that his girlfriend is having an affair with his brother. Heartbroken, he retreats to a cottage in France, where he develops a bond with his Portuguese housekeeper Aurélia despite their inability to speak the other's language. Months later Jamie returns to propose to her, speaking halting Portuguese; Aurélia accepts in broken English, revealing she has also been learning his language "just in cases."

Harry, the managing director of a design firm, is married to Karen, with whom he has two children. His flirtatious secretary Mia encourages his attention and hints she wants a special Christmas gift. Karen later finds evidence suggesting Harry bought Mia an expensive necklace, which devastates her and forces Harry to confront the damage his behaviour has caused to their marriage.

Karen's brother David, the newly elected Prime Minister, is attracted to Natalie, a junior member of his household staff, on first sight. After witnessing the visiting US president behave inappropriately toward her, David distances himself from Natalie. On Christmas Eve, however, he realises his feelings and searches for her door-to-door in her neighbourhood. They reunite during a school nativity play and publicly reveal their relationship.

Daniel, recently widowed, struggles to support his stepson Sam in their shared grief. Sam reveals that he is infatuated with an American classmate named Joanna and resolves to win her attention by learning the drums for the school's Christmas concert. Encouraged by Daniel, Sam later rushes to Heathrow Airport to confess his feelings before she returns to the United States.

At Harry's company, Sarah quietly longs for her colleague Karl. Their relationship begins to develop, but Sarah repeatedly interrupts their attempts at intimacy to answer phone calls from her institutionalised brother Michael, for whom she feels responsible. Ultimately, her devotion to caring for him prevents the relationship from progressing.

Interconnections between the Love Actually characters

Elsewhere, a shy romance develops between John and Judy, two film stand-ins who simulate sex scenes professionally but struggle with intimacy in their personal lives. Meanwhile, Colin, frustrated with his lack of romantic success in Britain, travels to the United States convinced his accent will make him appealing, and finds enthusiastic attention from several American women.

A month later, the characters' stories converge at Heathrow Airport, where several of them reunite with loved ones as Billy Mack appears on the airport TV screens accepting his prize with a big reveal.

== Cast ==
- Emma Thompson as Karen
- Hugh Grant as David, the Prime Minister
- Alan Rickman as Harry
- Liam Neeson as Daniel
- Martine McCutcheon as Natalie
- Colin Firth as Jamie
- Bill Nighy as Billy Mack
- Thomas Brodie-Sangster as Sam
- Laura Linney as Sarah
- Andrew Lincoln as Mark
- Lúcia Moniz as Aurélia
- Keira Knightley as Juliet
- Olivia Olson as Joanna
- Martin Freeman as John
- Joanna Page as Judy
- Heike Makatsch as Mia
- Gregor Fisher as Joe
- Rodrigo Santoro as Karl
- Kris Marshall as Colin
- Abdul Salis as Tony
- Chiwetel Ejiofor as Peter
- Billy Bob Thornton as the American President
- Rowan Atkinson as Rufus – jewellery salesman
- Sienna Guillory as Jamie's girlfriend
- Marcus Brigstocke as Mikey
- Joanna Bacon as Natalie's Mum
- Jill Freud as the housekeeper at No. 10
- Claudia Schiffer as Carol
- Nina Sosanya as Annie
- Margery Mason as Harris Street old lady
- Gillian Barge as Cabinet minister
- Ivana Miličević as Stacey – American dreamgirl
- John Sharian as Wisconsin taxi driver
- Wyllie Longmore as Jeremy
- Dan Fredenburgh as Jamie's bad brother
- Lynden David Hall as the wedding singer
- Sheila Allen as Jamie's mum
- Junior Simpson as wedding DJ
- Jo Whiley as Radio DJ
- January Jones as Jeannie – American angel
- Elisha Cuthbert as Carol-Anne – American goddess
- Laura Rees as record company executive
- Wes Butters as Radio 1 Chart Show DJ
- Lulu Popplewell as Daisy
- Brian Bovell as Radio Watford DJ
- Julia Davis as Nancy
- Ruby Turner as Jean
- Adam Godley as Mr Trench
- Élisabeth Margoni as Eleonore
- Edward Hardwicke as Sam's grandfather
- Caroline John as Sam's grandmother
- Meg Wynn Owen as Mary, the PM's secretary
- Nancy Sorrell as Greta
- Shannon Elizabeth as Harriet – the sexy one
- Denise Richards as Carla – the real friendly one
- Richard Curtis as trombone player (uncredited)
- Rebecca Frayn as Joanna, Daniel's wife (uncredited)
- Jeanne Moreau as taxi passenger at Marseille Airport (uncredited)
- Ant McPartlin as TV host Ant (himself)
- Declan Donnelly as TV host Dec (himself)
- Michael Parkinson as TV host Parkinson (himself)

== Production ==
=== Development ===
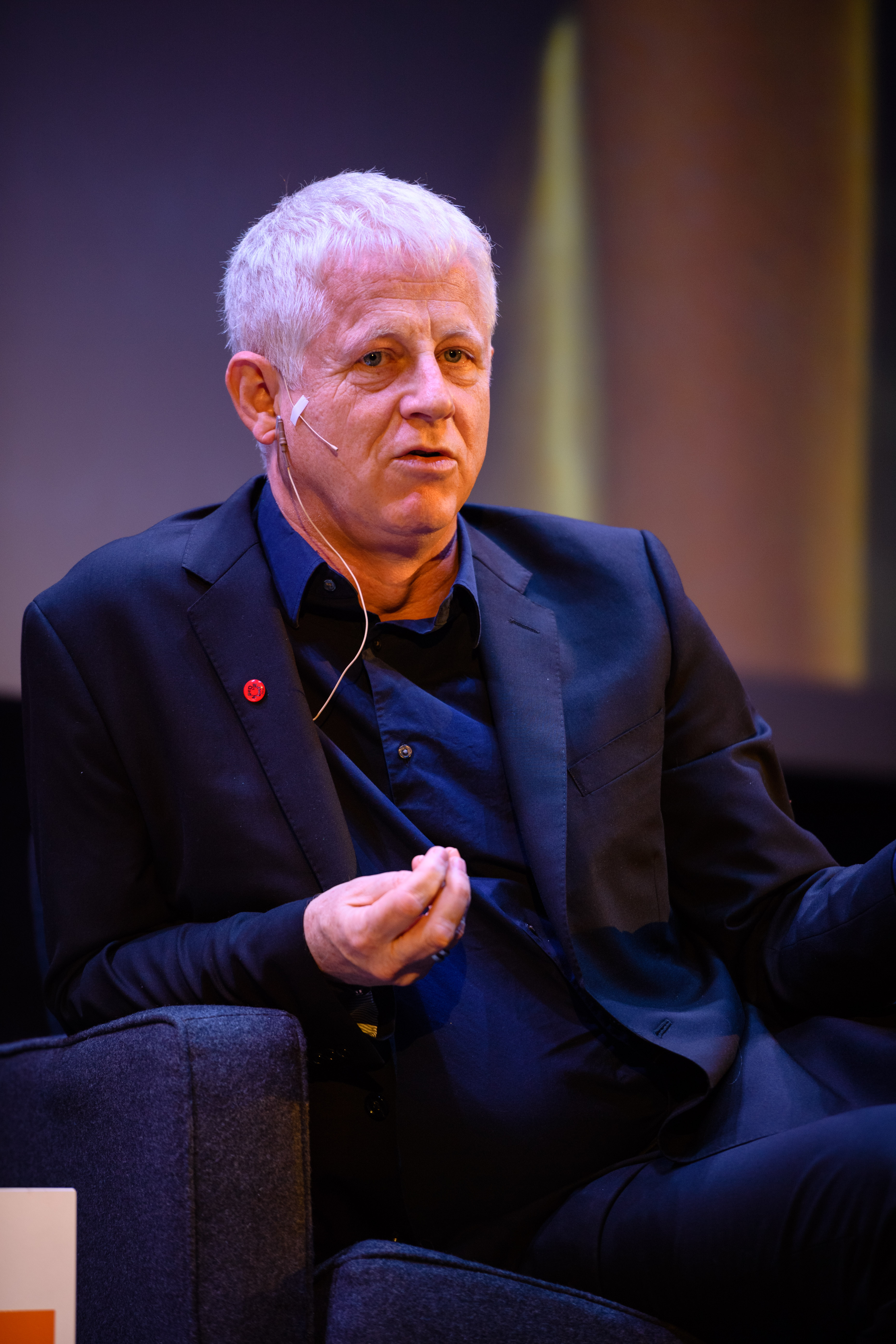
The film's director, Richard Curtis

Initially, Curtis started writing with two distinct and separate films in mind, each featuring expanded versions of what would eventually become storylines in Love Actually: those featuring Hugh Grant and Colin Firth. He changed tack and became frustrated with the process. Partly inspired by the films of Robert Altman as well as films such as Pulp Fiction, and inspired by Curtis having become "more interested in writing a film about love and what love sort of means" he had the idea of creating an ensemble film. The film initially did not have any sort of Christmas theme, although Curtis's penchant for such films eventually caused him to write it as one.

Curtis's original concept for the film included fourteen different scenarios, but four of them were cut (two having been filmed). The scene in which Colin attempts to chat up the female caterer at the wedding appeared in drafts of the screenplay for Four Weddings and a Funeral, but was cut from the final version. The music video for Billy Mack's song, "Christmas Is All Around", is a tribute to Robert Palmer's 1986 video, "Addicted to Love". Curtis has spoken negatively about the editing process for the film, which he labelled in 2014 as a "catastrophe" and "the only nightmare scenario that I've been caught in". The film was rushed in order to be ready for the 2003 Christmas season which he likened to "three-dimensional chess". For the scene in which Rowan Atkinson's character Rufus annoys Harry, Alan Rickman's reaction was reportedly genuine, having been "driven insane" by the time constraints. Hugh Grant disliked filming the dance scene as he called it "excruciating" and "absolute hell". In a 2023 interview, Curtis would later call the card scene "a bit weird".

=== Casting ===
Ant & Dec played themselves in the film with Nighy's character referring to Dec as "Ant or Dec". This refers to the common mistaking of one for the other, owing to their constant joint professional presence as a comedy and presenting duo. The veteran actress Jeanne Moreau is seen briefly, entering a taxi at the Marseille Airport. The soul singer Ruby Turner appears as Joanna's mother, one of the backing singers at the school Christmas pageant. Helder Costa plays Mr Barros, Aurelia's father. He is a veteran actor in Portuguese cinema. Thompson used the experience of her own marriage breaking up for the role of Karen. Joe Alwyn auditioned for the role of Sam; Alwyn read scenes with Grant and Curtis.

Curtis cast his mother-in-law, actress Jill Freud, as the Prime Minister's cleaner. Curtis cast his daughter Scarlett in the film; she was given the choice of being an angel or a lobster, and played the part of Lobster number 2 in the nativity play, on the condition that she meet Keira Knightley. Curtis originally had two actors in mind for the part of Mack, but he could not decide and then told casting director Mary Selway to find someone who would do the part well but whom he would never think to cast; she suggested Nighy.

=== Locations ===
Most of the film was made on location in London, including Heathrow Airport, Trafalgar Square, the central court of Somerset House in the Strand, Grosvenor Chapel on South Audley Street near Hyde Park, St Paul's Church, Clapham, the Millennium Bridge, Selfridges department store on Oxford Street, Lambeth Bridge, the Tate Modern in the former Bankside Power Station, Canary Wharf, Marble Arch, St. Luke's Mews off All Saint's Road in Notting Hill, Chelsea Bridge, the OXO Tower, London City Hall, Poplar Road in Herne Hill, Elliott School in Pullman Gardens, Putney, and Marseille Airport. Scenes set in 10 Downing Street were filmed at Shepperton Studios.

=== Standing up to the US president ===
Following Tony Blair's resignation as Prime Minister, pundits and speculators commented on a potential anti-American shift in Gordon Brown's cabinet as a "Love Actually moment", referring to the scene in which Hugh Grant's character stands up to the US president.

In 2009, during President Barack Obama's first visit to the UK, American political commentator Chris Matthews referred to the president in Love Actually as an example of George W. Bush and other former presidents' bullying of European allies. Commenting on this, Mediaite's Jon Bershad described the U.S. president character as a "sleazy Bill Clinton/George W. Bush hybrid".

In the scene in question, the swaggering president bullies the prime minister and then sexually harasses a member of the household staff. In September 2013, David Cameron made a speech in reply to Russia's comment that Britain was "a small island no one listens to", which drew comparisons with Hugh Grant's speech during the film.

=== Cut storyline ===
One storyline consisting of two scenes, featuring the only gay love story, was cut and not included. In the first scene, Anne Reid, as the headmistress of Karen's children's school, is revealed to be going home to her terminally ill partner, Geraldine, played by Frances de la Tour. In the second scene, while speaking at the Christmas concert, Karen acknowledges Geraldine's recent death. Curtis said he regretted losing this storyline.

== Music ==
The UK and US versions of the film contain two instances of alternative music. In the UK cut, the montage leading up to and continuing through the first part of the office party is set to the song "Too Lost in You", by the British group Sugababes. In the US version of the film, this song is replaced with "The Trouble with Love Is", performed by the American singer Kelly Clarkson. Subsequently, in the UK version's end credit roll, the second song is a cover of "Jump (For My Love)" performed by Girls Aloud; in the US version, this song is replaced with "Too Lost in You".

Several songs were heard in the film but did not appear on either soundtrack:

- "Bye Bye Baby (Baby Goodbye)" performed by Bay City Rollers
- "Puppy Love" performed by S Club Juniors
- "All I Want for Christmas Is You" performed by Tessa Niles
- "River" performed by Joni Mitchell
- "Rose" from the Titanic score, written by James Horner
- "Like I Love You" performed by Justin Timberlake
- "All Alone on Christmas" performed by Darlene Love
- "Smooth" by Santana featuring Rob Thomas
- "Silent Night" performed by Pre Teens
- "Good King Wenceslas" performed by Hugh Grant (as David) and Andrew Tinkler (as Gavin)
- "Catch a Falling Star" performed by child cast

== Reception ==
=== Box office ===
Love Actually grossed $60.3 million in the United States and Canada, $62.7 million in the United Kingdom, and $191.7 million in other territories, for a worldwide total of $252.6 million, against a budget of $40-45 million. It spent its first five weeks in the Top 10 at the U.S. box office.

=== Critical response ===
On the review aggregator website Rotten Tomatoes, 65% of 231 critics' reviews are positive. The website's consensus reads: "A sugary tale overstuffed with too many stories. Still, the cast charms." Audiences polled by CinemaScore gave the film an average grade of "B+" on an A+ to F scale.

Michael Atkinson of The Village Voice called it "love British style, handicapped slightly by corny circumstance and populated by colorful neurotics". Roger Ebert of the Chicago Sun-Times gave the film three and a half out of four stars, describing it as "a belly-flop into the sea of romantic comedy ... The movie's only flaw is also a virtue: ... It feels a little like a gourmet meal that turns into a hot-dog eating contest."

Nev Pierce of the BBC awarded it four of a possible five stars and called it a "vibrant romantic comedy ... Warm, bittersweet and hilarious, this is lovely, actually. Prepare to be smitten." In his review in The New York Times, journalist A. O. Scott wrote "the film's governing idea of love is both shallow and dishonest, and its sweet, chipper demeanor masks a sour cynicism about human emotions that is all the more sleazy for remaining unacknowledged."

In Rolling Stone, Peter Travers rated it two stars out of a possible four, saying: "There are laughs laced with feeling here, but the deft screenwriter Richard Curtis dilutes the impact by tossing in more and more stories." Christopher Orr of The Atlantic was negative toward the work and described it as the least romantic movie of all time, considering its ultimate message to be "It's probably best if you give up on love altogether and get on with the rest of your life."

Since its initial release, some publications have come to regard Love Actually as a cult film, as it is habitually watched by many people as a holiday staple. Despite this, the film continues to be highly divisive amongst critics and audiences. Publications such as CNN, The Atlantic and The Telegraph have written positively about Love Actually, whilst others such as The Independent, Cosmopolitan and The Guardian have panned the film. Some publications in later years have labelled it as one of the worst Christmas films ever made.

In 2025, it was one of the films voted for the "Readers' Choice" edition of The New York Times' list of "The 100 Best Movies of the 21st Century," finishing at number 248.

== Accolades ==
Ceremony	Award	Recipient	Result	Ref.
BAFTA	Best British Film	Love Actually	Nominated	
BAFTA	Best Actor in a Supporting Role	Bill Nighy	Won	
BAFTA	Best Actress in a Supporting Role	Emma Thompson	Nominated	
Golden Globe Awards	Best Motion Picture – Musical or Comedy	Love Actually	Nominated	
Golden Globe Awards	Best Screenplay	Love Actually	Nominated	
9th Critics' Choice Awards	Best Acting Ensemble	Love Actually	Nominated	
Empire Awards	Best British Film	Love Actually	Won	
Empire Awards	Best British Actress	Emma Thompson	Won	
Empire Awards	Best Newcomer	Martine McCutcheon	Won	
Empire Awards	Best Newcomer	Andrew Lincoln	Nominated	
Evening Standard British Film Awards	Best Actress	Emma Thompson	Won	
Evening Standard British Film Awards	Peter Sellers Award for Comedy	Bill Nighy	Won	
European Film Award	Jameson People's Choice Award for Best Actor	Hugh Grant	Nominated	
European Film Award	Jameson Award	Richard Curtis	Nominated	
London Film Critics Circle Award	Best British Supporting Actor	Bill Nighy	Won	
London Film Critics Circle Award	Best British Supporting Actress	Emma Thompson	Won	
Los Angeles Film Critics Association Award	Best Supporting Actor	Bill Nighy	Won	
Satellite Awards	Best Supporting Actor, Musical or Comedy	Bill Nighy, Thomas Sangster	Nominated	
Satellite Awards	Best Supporting Actress, Musical or Comedy	Emma Thompson	Nominated	

== Other adaptations ==
The screenplay by Richard Curtis was published by Michael Joseph Ltd. in the United Kingdom and by St. Martin's Griffin in the US.

== Red Nose Day Actually ==
In 2017, Richard Curtis wrote a script for Red Nose Day that reunited a dozen characters and picked up their storylines fourteen years later. Filming began in February 2017, and the short film was broadcast on BBC One on 24 March 2017.

== Home media ==
Universal Studios Home Video released the film on VHS and DVD on 27 April 2004, and ported it to Blu-ray in November 2009. The film was released on Ultra HD Blu-ray on 21 November 2023 for the film's 20th anniversary, featuring a 4K restoration.

== See also ==
- List of Christmas films
- List of fictional prime ministers of the United Kingdom
- Love Is All (Dutch: Alles is Liefde), 2007 Dutch romantic comedy film inspired by Love Actually
- Salute To Love (Hindi: Salaam-e-Ishq), 2007 Indian film based on Love Actually
- New Year Trees (Russian: Yolki), also known as Six Degrees of Celebration, a 2010 comedy film that launched a successful movie franchise spanning multiple sequels
- Letters to Santa (Polish: Listy do M.), 2011 Polish film inspired by Love Actually
- "Glee, Actually", a 2012 holiday episode from the fourth season of the American musical television series Glee
- It All Began When I Met You, 2013 Japanese film inspired by Love Actually
