= Wyllie Longmore =

British actor (1940–2023)

- Born: 1940; Stirling, St. Ann, Jamaica
- Died: 4 January 2023 (aged 82)
- Education: Rose Bruford College of Speech and Drama, Sidcup, Bexley, London
- Known for: Coronation Street; Love Actually

Wyllie Longmore (1940 – 4 January 2023) was a Jamaican-born British actor who appeared on Coronation Street as Dr McKinnon and Love Actually as associate of the Prime Minister, played by Hugh Grant.

== Early life ==
Wyllie Longmore was born in the small village of Stirling in St. Ann parish, Jamaica in 1940 and moved to the United Kingdom in 1961 when he was 21. Longmore trained at the Rose Bruford College of Speech and Drama in Sidcup in the London Borough of Bexley, before moving to Manchester. Longmore's father thought he was going to a teacher training college rather than an acting school.

== Death ==
Longmore died of cancer on 4 January 2023, aged 82.

== Career ==
=== Stage ===
After graduation Longmore joined the Leeds Theatre-in-Education Company, and through this met theatre director David Thacker who gave him his first stage role as the nobleman Ross in Macbeth performing at The Old Vic in Waterloo, London. However many of Longmore's stage performances were in Manchester, playing Cutler in Ma Rainey's Black Bottom at the Royal Exchange Theatre, and Antonio in The Merchant of Venice, and Jesse in I Just Stopped By To See The Man, both at Bolton Octagon. He won two Manchester Evening News Theatre Awards for his stage acting, winning an award for his performance in My Children! My Africa! by South African playwright Athol Fugard directed by Ian Forrest at the Octagon Theatre in 1995. Longmore also set up Arden School of Theatre in Manchester, set up in association with The Royal Exchange Theatre where he was Head of Acting at the school, and until 1981 he taught in the Drama Department at Manchester University.

=== Screen ===
Longmore most famous screen role was on the soap opera, Coronation Street, starting in 1992, Longmore played Dr McKinnon, his character treated Don Brennan played by Geoffrey Hinsliff following Brennan's car accident. He also had a role in Love Actually (2003) as the associate of the Prime Minister, played by Hugh Grant. As well as performing in Coronation Street and Love Actually, Longmore appeared in The Bill, Between the Lines, Casualty, Merseybeat, Waking the Dead and Cold Feet.

=== Stage and Screen Performances ===
==== Stage ====
===== Acting =====
| Show | Role | Playwright | Year Performed | Theatre | Director | Ref. |
|---|---|---|---|---|---|---|
| Macbeth | Ross | William Shakespeare | | The Old Vic in Waterloo, London | David Thacker | |
| Statements After an Arrest Under the Immorality Act | | Athol Fugard | 1983 | Duke's Playhouse, Lancaster | | |
| My Children! My Africa! | | Athol Fugard | 1995 | Octagon Theatre, Bolton | Ian Forrest | |

===== Directing =====
| Show | Playwright | Year Performed | Theatre |
|---|---|---|---|
| A Raisin in the Sun | Lorraine Hansberry | | Contact Theatre, Manchester |
