= Ayvianna Snow =

British actress

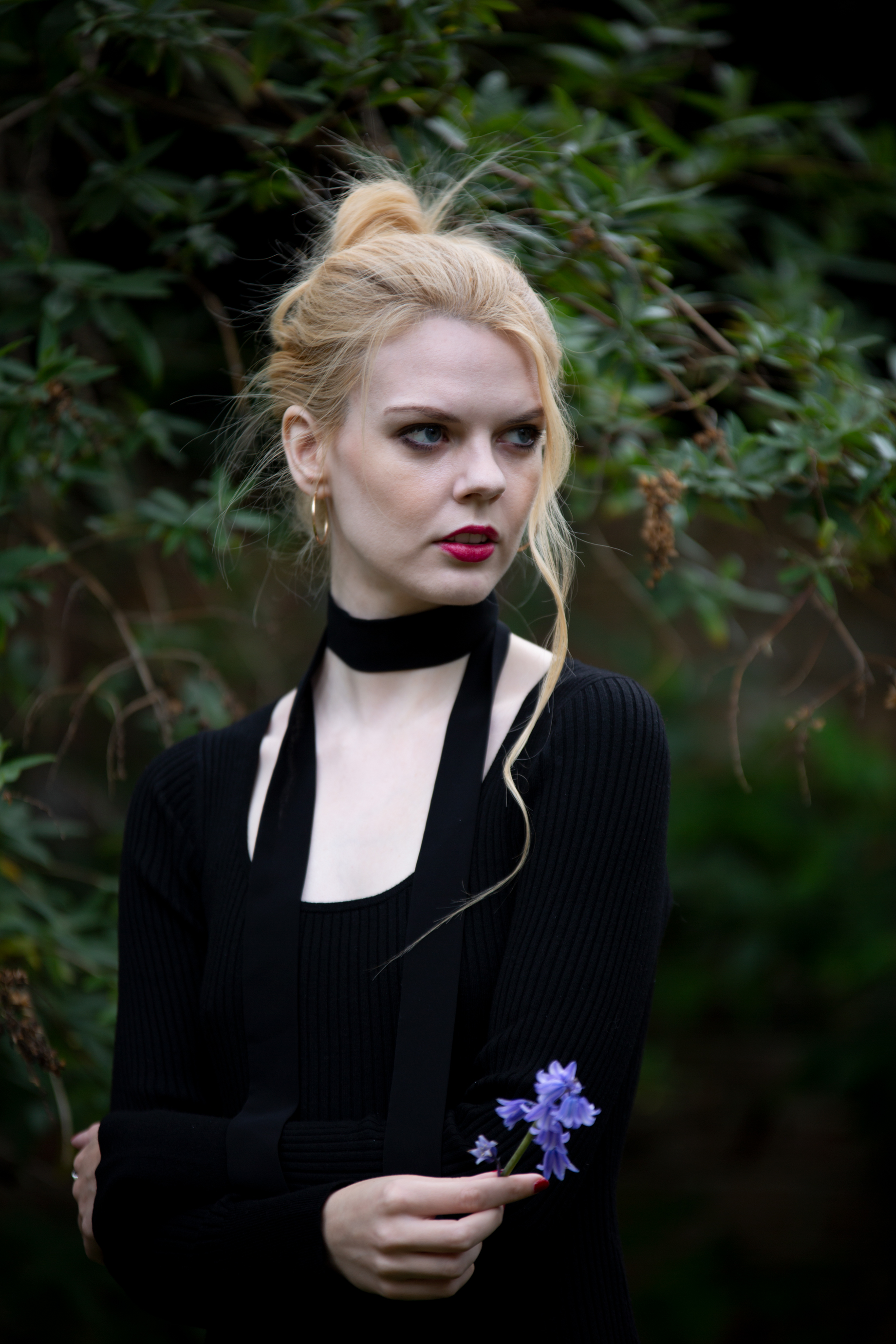
- Born: Derry, Northern Ireland
- Citizenship: British; Irish
- Education: Arden School of Theatre
- Occupation: Actress
- Years active: 2016–present

Ayvianna Snow is a British-Irish actress known predominantly for her work in the horror genre. She was born in Derry, Northern Ireland. She trained at the Arden School of Theatre.

== Film ==
Her first film appearance was in White Colour Black, directed by Joseph A. Adesunloye. White Colour Black was selected for the 2017 BFI London Film Festival and was nominated for two British Independent Film Awards.

She played Naomi in Retribution in 2017, a gangster movie starring Rishi Nair, Funda Önal, Calum Best and Alex Reid.

She followed this with an appearance as the nun Sister Lilith in 2018 British film The Convent, directed by Paul Hyett.

In 2019, she appeared in British horror film The Seven, starring American actor Dean Cain.

Snow also appeared as the antagonist of 2020 feature film Black Lake, which screened at the Renegade Film Festival where it won the Best Cinematography award.

In 2021, she appeared as the lead antagonist, in British-Indian horror film Barun Rai and the House on the Cliff opposite Priyanshu Chatterjee and Nyra Banerjee. She also appeared opposite Tony Todd as Victoria in The Lockdown Hauntings which was directed by Howard J. Ford and filmed entirely during the COVID-19 lockdown in England.

In 2022, she appeared in the Irish film LOLA as reporter Rebecca Cavendish. LOLA was selected to screen at Locarno Film Festival, Dublin International Film Festival, Edinburgh International Film Festival and had a theatrical release in 2023. It is the first Irish film to win the Melies D'Or at Sitges Film Festival. It also won the Melies d'Argent award at Trieste Film Festival. It was one of the most watched films on BFI Player in 2023. It featured a soundtrack by Neil Hannon of The Divine Comedy.

LOLA was nominated for seven IFTA Film & Drama Awards in 2024 in the categories Best Film, Best Director, Best Editing, Best Costume Design, Best Original Music, Best Script, and Best Production Design, winning two (Best Original Music and Best Costume Design).

She appeared in Video Shop Tales of Terror, playing a woman trafficked by the Nazis in the 1940s, directed by Michael Fausti with Spencer Hawken acting as executive producer. The film was inspired by the true story of Salon Kitty.

She first worked with Creativ Studios in 2022, appearing as Jessica in Ripper's Revenge, based on the Jack the Ripper legend. She worked with the studio again in 2023, this time appearing as Maria in Wrath of Dracula directed by Steve Lawson. She worked with the studio again in 2025, appearing as Kendra in Dublin-set horror The St Patrick's Day Massacre.

In 2022, she appeared as Elvina in Argh & the Quest for the Golden Dragon Skull directed by Martin Gooch, and played The Spy in the music video for "The Invisible Man" by The Damned from their Darkadelic album.

She appeared in two new horror films in the summer of 2023, both of which screened in competition at FrightFest; How To Kill Monsters directed by Stewart Sparke, and Punch directed by Andy Edwards.

In 2023, she was appointed a judge at the Romford Film Festival.

In 2024, she was appointed the host of Romford Film Festival, replacing Kevin Haldon.

In 2024, she appeared in two vampire films; Bogieville and Drained (2024 film), both directed by Sean Cronin (actor).

In 2025, she appeared as the Succubus in Andy Edwards' Rumpelstiltskin which had its world premiere at Glasgow Film Festival. Rumpelstiltskin won Best Thriller and Best Producer (Andy Edwards and Becca Hirani) at the National Film Awards UK in 2025.

In 2026, Snow was named the British Indie Horror Artist of the Year by British Horror Studios. The Studios are led by Lawrie Brewster.

In 2026, she appeared as Lauren in Red Riding, the directorial debut of actor Craig Conway, which had its premiere at the Glasgow Film Festival. She also appeared in Well-Being, directed by Kevin McNally.

Also in 2026, she appeared in Jailbroken starring Scottish actor Bryan Larkin, which had its premiere at the Glasgow Film Festival.

== Theatre ==
Snow appeared in Anguish & Enthusiasm in 2013, directed by American artist Sarah Pierce at Library Theatre; the show transferred to Cornerhouse.

Snow appeared in The Adventures of Sherlock Holmes at Brass Works Theatre in 2012, directed by Adrian Harris, and Inside Wagner's Head in 2013 at Linbury Studio Theatre starring Simon Callow.

She is elected Chair of Equity London North branch.

She is a Trustee of Unity Theatre Trust, alongside fellow trustees Ann Mitchell and Shola Adewusi.

She is the Director of the New Actors Centre.

== Video games ==
She has worked with D'Avekki Studios, appearing as Millicent in Dark Nights with Poe and Munro and as Jamie in Murderous Muses.

== Filmography ==
Year	Film	Character	Director	Note
2016	White Colour Black	Charlotte	Joseph A. Adesunloye	
2017	Retribution	Naomi	Christine Edwards	
2018	The Convent	Sister Lilith	Paul Hyett	
2018	Hate Story 4	Newsreader	Vishal Pandya	Hindi movie
2019	The Seven	Chloe	Richard Colton	
2019	Mr. Majnu	PC Snow	Venky Atluri	Telugu movie
2019	De De Pyaar De	Ayesha's friend	Akiv Ali	Hindi movie
2020	Black Lake	The Churail	K XI	
2021	Barun Rai and the House on the Cliff	Polly	Sam Bhattacharjee	Indian English movie
2021	Time to Dance	Jane	Stanley d'Costa	Hindi movie
2021	Dark Nights with Poe and Munro	Millicent	Tim Cowles	
2021	The Lockdown Hauntings	Victoria	Howard J. Ford	
2021	Wyvern Hill	Young Beth	Jonathan Zaurin	
2022	"Vergessen" segment in Video Shop Tales of Terror	Ilsa	Michael Fausti	
2022	Not For Broadcast	Janet	Alex Paterson	
2022	Argh & the Quest for the Golden Dragon Skull	Elvina	Martin Gooch	
2022	LOLA	Rebecca	Andrew Legge	
2022	"The Invisible Man" video from album Darkadelic	The Spy	Martin Gooch	
2023	How To Kill Monsters	Velma	Stewart Sparke	
2023	Ripper's Revenge	Jessica	Steve Lawson	
2023	Wrath of Dracula	Maria	Steve Lawson	
2024	Burnt Flowers	Alice Kyteller	Michael Fausti	
2024	Bogieville	Mary	Sean Cronin	
2024	Derelict	Anna	Jonathan Zaurin	
2025	Skullhunter	Karen	James Solly & Charles Solly	
2025	Drained	Nicola	Sean Cronin & Peter Stylianou	
2025	Rumpelstiltskin	Succubus	Andy Edwards	
2025	The St. Patrick's Day Massacre	Kendra	Steve Lawson	
2025	Video Shop Tales of Terror II: Lust & Revenge	Mabel	Various directors	
2026	Well-Being	A.I. Usher	Kevin McNally	
2026	Red Riding	Lauren	Craig Conway	
2026	Jailbroken	Emergency Operator	Vasily Chuprina	
