= Primeval series 1 =

2007 series of British sci-fi programme

Primeval
- Series 1
- DVD box set cover art
- Starring: Douglas Henshall; James Murray; Andrew-Lee Potts; Lucy Brown; Hannah Spearritt; Juliet Aubrey; Ben Miller; Mark Wakeling
- No. of episodes: 6

Release
- Original network: ITV
- Original release: 10 February – 17 March 2007

Series chronology
- Next → Series 2

The first series of the British science fiction programme Primeval began on 10 February 2007 and concluded on 17 March 2007 after airing six episodes. Primeval follows a team of scientists tasked with investigating the appearance of temporal anomalies across the United Kingdom through which prehistoric and futuristic creatures enter the present. The first series stars Douglas Henshall, James Murray, Andrew-Lee Potts, Lucy Brown, Hannah Spearritt, Juliet Aubrey, Ben Miller and Mark Wakeling.

Originally conceived by Tim Haines in the aftermath of the production of Walking with Dinosaurs (1999), Primeval was worked on as a concept by both Haines and Adrian Hodges for a lengthy period of time, intended as a BBC production. The BBC ultimately turned down the project after the revival of Doctor Who in 2005 due to deeming Primeval to be too similar, whereafter ITV was approached. ITV enthusiastically commissioned the series, which received a £6 million budget. Haines and Hodges thereafter approached directors Cilla Ware and Jamie Payne, each of whom directed three episodes each. Every episode of the first series of Primeval was intended to be unique in both the creatures featured and the atmosphere of the episode.

Though commissioned as a contender for Doctor Who by ITV and dismissed before its release by some commentators as a "Doctor Who ripoff", Primeval became both a critical and an audience hit upon its release, with the first episode being viewed by over seven million viewers. Critics praised Primeval for its overarching story arc, its feel and atmosphere, and its choice of creatures. Most critics also felt that the series overcame its early dismissals and succeeded in becoming something unique in its own right. Other than Nick Cutter, played by Henshall, the characters and their development throughout the series were met with a more mixed response from some critics.

== Episodes ==
No. overall	No. in series	Episode	Directed by	Written by	Original release date	UK viewers (millions)
1	1	Episode 1 "Leapin' Lizards"	Cilla Ware	Adrian Hodges	10 February 2007	7.09
A sighting of a strange creature occurs on the outskirts of the Forest of Dean, leading a small team of scientists and government officials — Nick Cutter, Stephen Hart, Connor Temple, Abby Maitland, and Claudia Brown — to investigate it. They find a Scutosaurus in the forest, capture a curious Coelurosauravus, and discover a time anomaly that leads to the late Permian period, 250 million years ago. The team soon realise that a Inostrancevia also came through, and they must find it before it kills anyone.
2	2	Episode 2 "Underground Infestation"	Cilla Ware	Adrian Hodges	17 February 2007	6.29
After a London Underground cleaner is fatally bitten by some type of giant insect, James Lester brings the team together to investigate. They find another anomaly that leads to the late Carboniferous, and a colony of giant spider, Megarachne, that have come through. Using powerful lights to send the spiders back, the team are then attacked by the true killer, an Arthropleura, which bites and poisons Stephen. The race is now on to extract a sample of venom from the giant arthropod to synthesise an antivenom before Stephen dies.
3	3	Episode 3 "Helen Makes Contact"	Cilla Ware	Adrian Hodges	24 February 2007	6.17
A man at a local swimming pool is killed by a Mosasaurus when an anomaly appears there. But when the anomaly disappears and reopens several miles away in a reservoir, Cutter realises that the anomalies have the ability to move, and his theory is confirmed when the anomaly opens for a third time in a residential basement, where a plumber is attacked there by a Hesperornis. When the team find proof that Cutter's wife, Helen, is alive in the past, Cutter is ordered through the anomaly to find and bring her back.
4	4	Episode 4 "Dodo Madness"	Jamie Payne	Richard Kurti and Bev Doyle	3 March 2007	5.81
Helen escapes from custody at the Home Office by taking the team to an anomaly that unleashes a flock of dodos. Some of these dodos are carrying deadly cestoid parasites capable of infecting humans. Unknown to the team, Connor's friends, Tom and Duncan, capture one of the dodos, but when Tom is infected by the parasite and goes on the rampage, Cutter and the team must find him before they have a pandemic on their hands.
5	5	Episode 5 "Pter-able News"	Jamie Payne	Chris Lang	10 March 2007	6.46
A Pteranodon turns up at a golf course, and a golfer is killed. Cutter and his team go to investigate and find the anomaly up in the air. The team track the flying reptile down to send it back to its time, but Cutter and Claudia become trapped in a mansion by a swarm of bloodthirsty Anurognathus. As Cutter goes to get help, Claudia finds salvation in the unlikely hands of Helen Cutter.
6	6	Episode 6 "Future Foe"	Jamie Payne	Adrian Hodges	17 March 2007	6.52
Helen Cutter returns and informs the team that she has seen a highly evolved predator from the future enter the present day. After dispatching the adult creature, Cutter and Helen decide to take its young back through the anomaly in the Forest of Dean, hoping to locate the anomaly to the future, a decision that proves to be a mistake when the creatures break free. Upon his return to the present Cutter is shocked to discover that Claudia Brown has disappeared and apparently never existed in this world.

== Cast ==
=== Main cast ===
- Douglas Henshall as Nick Cutter
- James Murray as Stephen Hart
- Andrew-Lee Potts as Connor Temple
- Lucy Brown as Claudia Brown
- Hannah Spearritt as Abby Maitland
- Juliet Aubrey as Helen Cutter
- Ben Miller as James Lester
- Mark Wakeling as Captain Tom Ryan

=== Guest cast ===
- Jake Curran as Tom
- James Bradshaw as Duncan
- John Voce as Tim Parker
- Mike Goodenough as Dave Greene
- Gail Kemp as Mary Trent
- Jack Montgomery as Ben Trent
- Jane Cameron as Teacher
- Emily Dobbs as Woman on Tube
- Stephanie Street as Dr. Lewis
- Abigail Aston as Diane Johnson
- Andrew French as Detective Inspector
- Pascale Burgess as Jane Dexter
- Aled Pugh as Plumber
- Manjeet Mann as Mrs. Davis
- Amaar Sardharwalla as Small Boy
- Billy Carter as Doctor
- Ike Hamilton as Andy
- Mat Curtis as Jeff
- Adam G. Goodwin as Medic

== Production ==
=== Development and writing ===
Primeval was the idea of Tim Haines, the television producer behind the hit nature documentary series Walking with Dinosaurs (1999). Haines came up with the idea of producing a television drama with prehistoric creatures created with the same techniques used for Walking with Dinosaurs; his first attempt was the successful The Lost World (2001), an adaptation of the Arthur Conan Doyle novel of the same name. After The Lost World, Haines then came up with the idea of Primeval, initially provisionally titled Cutter's Bestiary. Among the influences for Cutter's Bestiary were the old science fiction films of Ray Harryhausen, fossil ghost lineages, Jurassic Park and King Kong. Haines was joined on the project in 2004 by Adrian Hodges, who devised the new title Primeval and produced some scripts for the BBC, the first of which envisioned it as merely a 90-minute television film. After several years of working on the concept, the BBC turned down Primeval in 2005 due to the revival of Doctor Who, which Primeval was now dubbed to be too similar to.

After being turned down by the BBC, Haines and Hodges pitched Primeval to ITV commissioner Nick Elliott. Elliott greenlit the series on account of liking the scripts produced by Hodges and out of a wish to replicate the success of the revived Doctor Who. With production secured, Haines and Hodges then moved on to recruiting directors and casting characters. Haines and Hodges hired the two directors Cilla Ware and Jamie Payne; though neither was much experienced with action, both were experienced with drama. The first series of Primeval had a budget of £6 million, a million per episode.

Every episode of the first series was envisioned as being stylistically and conceptually different from the others, with unique creatures and atmospheres. As a result, the directors made the decision to approach each episode as if they were "unique film[s] in [their] own right".

==== Casting ====
Casting for Primeval took place during January 2006 and actors were sent the scripts of the first three episodes. Lead actor Douglas Henshall did not audition for the role of Nick Cutter but was approached personally by Haines and Hodges, who explained the premise of the series to him. Haines and Hodges approached Henshall due to finding him talented, looking "like an action hero" and thinking that he brought a "kind of credibility". Henshall liked the writing and the premise, especially the idea of creating a series that was not only fun but also smart and educational. Henshall had at the time a choice between Primeval or a gritty drama, a type of project he had long been involved with, and "though it might be nice to go and chase dinosaurs for a while". He also stated that he was drawn to Primeval on account of his childhood fascination with dinosaurs and monsters. Henshall was given free rein to essentially play Cutter the way he wanted to, and decided to play him seriously to offer believability to the premise of the series. He deliberately played Cutter in the first series as uncomfortable with guns since he was a member of the public thrust into an extraordinary situation. Much like Henshall, James Murray saw the opportunity to play Stephen Hart as a chance to live out his childhood dreams and found the series to be "very new and very ambitious". Murray did some trekking in Belize for a few weeks to prepare for the role.

Andrew-Lee Potts auditioned for the role of Connor Temple and was eager to play the role due to finding the script to be unique, stating in later interviews that he had "never seen anything like it". His first audition took place the morning after he had done a night shoot for another project, which he believes helped make him "a little euphoric". Potts was also drawn to the role since he had previously mostly played "psychopaths" and Connor was a more nice character. Connor's characterisation in Primeval was developed by both Hodges and Potts together. Potts prepared for the role through searching for the creatures featured in the scripts on the internet. Hannah Spearritt also auditioned for the role of Abby Maitland; in later interviews Spearritt explained that the making of the series came at a perfect time when she was "ready to come back into TV" after being a part of the pop group S Club 7. Her audition involved a scene with Rex, a Coelurosauravus who was envisioned as a massive part of Abby's character. Spearritt was driven to the role of Abby since she saw it as an inspirational "swashbuckling female role". Spearritt stated in later interviews that she only dared to audition for the role due to Billie Piper, also with a pop music background, successfully landing the role of Rose Tyler in Doctor Who in 2005.

Lucy Brown was driven to the role of Claudia Brown both because Primeval had prehistoric creatures and because it was a "very character driven piece and it deals with real human relationships". Juliet Aubrey, who plays Helen Cutter, also cited the interesting relationships and their development as what made her want to play the part, as well as how Helen was "such a mystery figure". Aubrey was also interested in working together with Henshall, who she had nearly worked together with on several previous projects.

=== Visual effects ===
The visual effects of the first series of Primeval (as well as the subsequent second and third series) were created by the London-based visual effects company Framestore. Framestore had previously collaborated with Haines and his production team Impossible Pictures on Walking with Dinosaurs and other productions. In addition to the existing Framestore team, Christian Manz was also hired as a visual effects supervisor due to the highly ambitious effects required for Primeval. Each episode required about thirteen weeks of effects work, with eight weeks of animation, six weeks of compositing and three weeks of lighting. Usually multiple episodes were worked on at the same time. Framestore required a large crew, about 60 people, in order to complete the series on time; effects work on the first series began during filming in April 2006 and was finished in September.

=== Filming ===
The first series was shot on location over the course of about four and a half months, from March to August 2006. The series was filmed in two blocks, with Cilla Ware's episodes being shot first and then going into post-production as Jamie Payne's episodes began filming. Each block lasted for about nine weeks and was followed by nine weeks of post-production. The first series of Primeval was filmed mostly in and around London, alongside location shooting at the Forest of Dean and the Canary Islands.

== Release ==
=== Broadcast and ratings ===
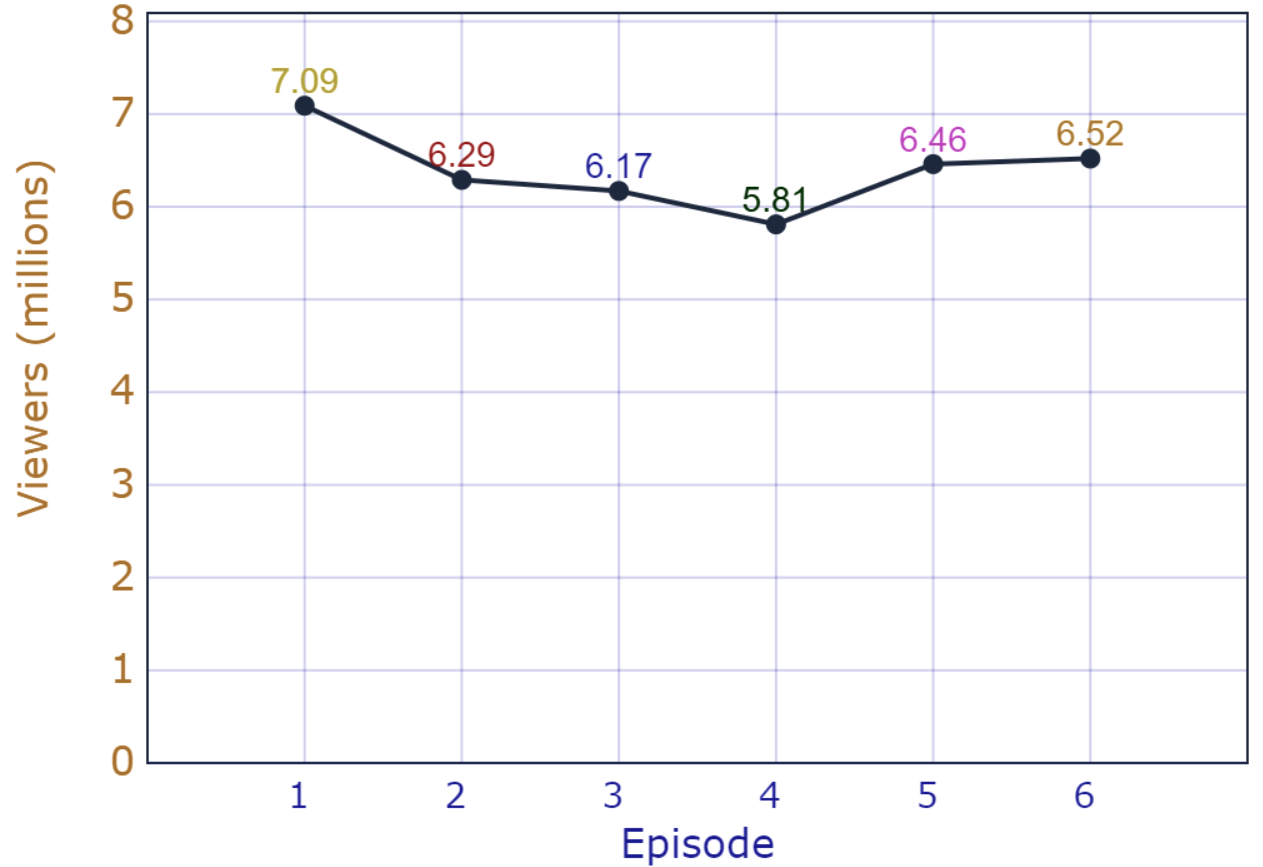
UK ratings for the episodes of the first series

The production of the first series was announced by ITV on 27 December 2005. The first promotional trailer for the series was released on 2 February 2007. The premiere of the first episode on 10 February was seen by over seven million viewers with an audience share of 29%, seen as a promising start to the series. The premiere was more than a million viewers up on the average audience of its slot on ITV and beat the simultaneous airing of Shrek on BBC One (which received 6.2 million viewers).

Viewing figures dropped over the course of the series; the second episode started with 6.8 million viewers but dropped a few hundred thousand over the course of its broadcast, though it still beat ITV's slot average of 5.7 million. After reaching a low point for the fourth episode (5.81 million viewers), viewership increased again and the series finished with the sixth episode being seen by 6.52 million viewers.

=== Home media ===
The DVD release of the first series included the 45-minute behind-the-scenes documentary The Making of Primeval.

DVD title	Number and duration of episodes	Release date
Primeval: The Complete Series One	6 x 45 min.	19 March 2007
Primeval: The Complete Series One & Two	13 x 45 min.	17 March 2008
Primeval: Series One - Three	23 x 45 min.	1 June 2009
Primeval: The Complete Series One - Five	36 x 45 min.	7 November 2011

== Critical reception ==
On review aggregator Rotten Tomatoes, the first season of Primeval holds an approval rating of 67% based on 12 reviews, with an average rating of 5.8/10. The website's critic consensus reads, "Unbelievable characters aside, Primeval is old-fashioned, fantastical family fare with decent visuals and a sense of adventure." The first series of Primeval was a critical hit. In addition to good reception in Britain, the series also received a positive response in the United States. Ray Richmond of The Hollywood Reporter called it "crackling-good" and praised both the effects and the storyline, a sentiment echoed by Rob Owen of the Pittsburgh Post-Gazette, who called Primeval a "rollicking adventure with decent special effects" and stated that it surpassed the series offered on the American Sci-Fi Channel in terms of story and character development. Primeval was also praised by Maureen Ryan of the Chicago Tribune, Hal Boedeker of the Orlando Sentinel, Matt Roush of TV Guide Magazine and Ginia Bellafante of The New York Times. Brian Lowry of Variety criticised the character elements of the series, but found Primeval to improve as the series progressed. Lowry also praised the effects, especially on account of having been achieved on a TV budget. Kyle Smith of New York Post thought Primeval could qualify as a "guilty pleasure" but saw potential in the concept to evolve further. Mary McNamara of Los Angeles Times gave Primeval a mixed review, stating that there was "far more galumphing than trotting going on, and not all of it done by prehistoric feet". Though she noted that the series improved over the course of the later episodes, she felt it was "not nearly enough".

Rob Hunter of Film School Rejects gave Primeval a highly positive review, stating that it might be the "best monster-of-the-week show since The X-Files". Hunter thought the series succeeded "brilliantly" at its concept and praised the effects of the series, giving particular praise to the fight between a future predator and gorgonopsid in the final episode as "one of the best CGI vs CGI fights you've ever seen". He enjoyed both the storylines and creature choices and also enjoyed the characters, concluding that the "cast has great chemistry and all of them work just as well with the effects scenes as they do with the dramatic".

Rob Buckley of The Medium is not Enough stated that although Primeval was clearly "ITV's answer to Doctor Who", the series managed to be "something completely different and acceptable in its own right". Buckley was pleasantly surprised by the first episode, which although "aimed at kids" he found to be "not half bad". Although Buckley felt that Primeval had certain holes in the plot and found the characters, with the exception of Douglas Henshall's Nick Cutter, to be somewhat lacklustre, he still thought the series was enjoyable and thrilling, with an intriguing series arc. Buckley criticised the effects as "not great" but praised the music, which he thought was better than the contemporary Doctor Who soundtracks.

Iain Clark of Strange Horizons gave the first series of Primeval a slightly more mixed review, finding some of the scripts to be "clichéd" and the characters (with the exception of Nick Cutter) to be poorly developed due to there often being little breathing-room for them. Clark also criticised the female characters of the series as "strong, but only to a point", noting that the only consistently interesting and independent female character, Helen Cutter, was "unlikeable right through to the finale". He commended the pace of Primeval as "seldom [dwelling] on any one scene or character long enough to become dull" and found all episodes other than the first to be "focused and engaging". Clark also praised the series for not being repetitive, with very different creatures used for each outing. He found the special effects to be noticeable but still convincing and concluded that the series was "solid entertainment" and that he was interested to see where it would go in the future. Though Clark did not think Primeval reached the level of Doctor Who, he found it to be superior to the Doctor Who spinoff series Torchwood.

Eamonn McCusker of The Digital Fix gave the first series of Primeval a cautiously positive review, stating that although it seemed to be "Saturday night television by committee", it was also enjoyable, a "rare example of ITV getting it right" and that the producers had managed to craft a "good show that stands very much apart" from series such as Doctor Who and Torchwood. Like Clark, McCusker did not feel that the first episode was a strong introduction, but felt that the later episodes got better and better. Though McCusker doubted Primeval would capture the public consciousness in the same way as Doctor Who, he felt that Primeval was the scarier of the two and that although "not a great show", it deserved at least a second series.
