= Arden School of Theatre =

The Arden School of Theatre
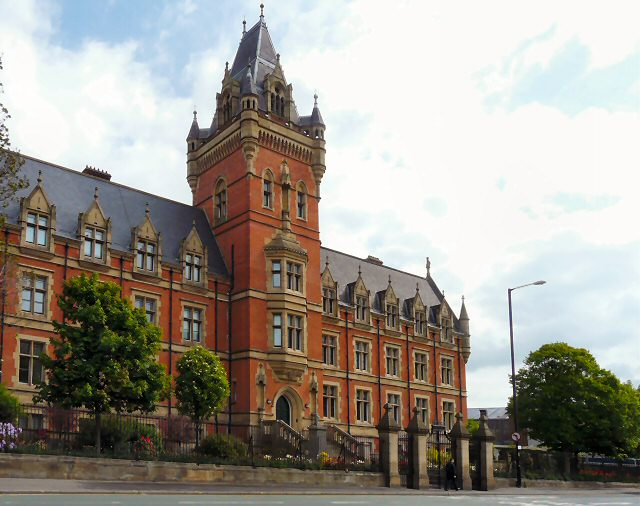
- Nichols House. Currently part of The Manchester College

Location
- 60 Great Ducie Street; Manchester, Greater Manchester, M3 1PT; England

Information
- Type: Drama school
- Established: 1991
- Founder: City College Manchester and Royal Exchange Theatre, Manchester
- Director of Curriculum: Robert Owen
- Head of School: Andrew Stephenson
- Validating University: Sheffield Hallam University
- Website: Official website

The Arden School of Theatre, also known as The Arden, is a drama school which is part of the Performing Arts faculty at UCEN Manchester in England, United Kingdom.

== History ==
The school was founded jointly by the Royal Exchange Theatre and South Manchester College in 1991 by the senior curriculum manager Robert S. Ely, to provide vocational degree level theatrical education in the North of England, one of the first to provide theatrical degrees in the United Kingdom. The name derived from the original City College Arden Campus where the drama school had been based between 1991 and 2004, in Northenden, South Manchester. Wyllie Longmore was a founding member of the School and he served as its head of Acting from 1991 to 2002.

In 2006, The Arden moved into new premises located over three floors at Universal Square. In September 2010 The Arden moved into Nicholls House, Ardwick, Manchester, a renovated Victorian building with additional rehearsal space, production rooms, and voice and singing rooms.

The college is a founder member of the National Skills Academy for Creative & Cultural Skills.

In 2024 the college became accredited by the CDMT.

== Facilities ==
In September 2022 The Arden moved into a new campus, City Campus Manchester, located opposite the AO Arena near Manchester City Centre; a newly built campus for UCEN Manchester courses. The facilities include two theatre spaces, wardrobe areas and costume design/build workshop, rehearsal rooms, drama studios, ensemble rooms, singing rooms, film studios, classrooms, band rehearsal rooms, practice rooms, and state of the art recording studios and live rooms.

== Courses and faculty ==
The school provides six BA (Hons) programmes, validated by Sheffield Hallam University in Acting, Dance and Performance, Musical Theatre, Technical Theatre and Stage Management, Theatre and Performance, and Vocal Studies and Performance, as well as postgraduate studies in Theatre Directing and Musical Direction.

The Arden teaching faculty includes theatre professionals such as musical director Robert Purvis and actor/composer Graham Lappin, television and film actors Marie Critchley, and Paul Broughton, dancers Belinda Grantham and Tomas Simon, and performance makers Wayne Steven Jackson and Graham Hicks.

The college has a wide range of relationships locally with the Contact Theatre and the Royal Exchange Theatre. Graduates showcases are presented each year both in the region and in London, with a number of casting agents for acting, dance, and musical theatre.

== Alumni ==
Graduates of the school include:

- Zöe Lucker - actress
- Tracy Shaw - actress
- Cherylee Houston - actress
- Kim Tiddy - actress
- Shaun Dooley- actor
- Saoirse-Monica Jackson - actress
- Miya Ocego - actress
- Amanda Henderson - actress
- Ayvianna Snow - actress
- Adam Long - actor
- Antony Hickling - actor and director
- Isabelle Smith - actress
