= Madalina Bellariu Ion =

Romanian actress (born 1993)

- Born: Madalina Bellariu Ion; 10 July 1993 (age 32); Pitesti, Romania
- Occupations: Actress; model
- Years active: 2008–present

Mădălina Bellariu Ion (born 10 July 1993) is a Romanian actress.

== Career ==
Ion's most notable television appearance is in The Young Pope, with Jude Law and Diane Keaton, directed by Paolo Sorrentino.

Ion's short film Love You Papa received the Silver Dolphin Trophy at the Cannes Corporate Media & TV Awards. She played Nicoletta, a werewolf, in the comedy-horror film Blue Moon, which was nominated for best film at the Screamfeast 2016 in Los Angeles, California.

In 2017, she appeared as Daphne in the Italian TV series The Teacher on Rai 1. In 2018, she co-starred in the Offie nominated Off-West End stage production of black comedy The Gift of the Gab in London. In 2019–2020, she was in the main cast of the drama series Sacrificiul: Alegerea on Antena 1, in the role of Maria.

Other credits include: Pennyworth, Coronation Street, Dobaara: See Your Evil (an adaptation of the 2013 American horror film Oculus), For Love or Money, Dampyr, and Take Cover)
