= Andrew-Lee Potts =

English actor (born 1979)

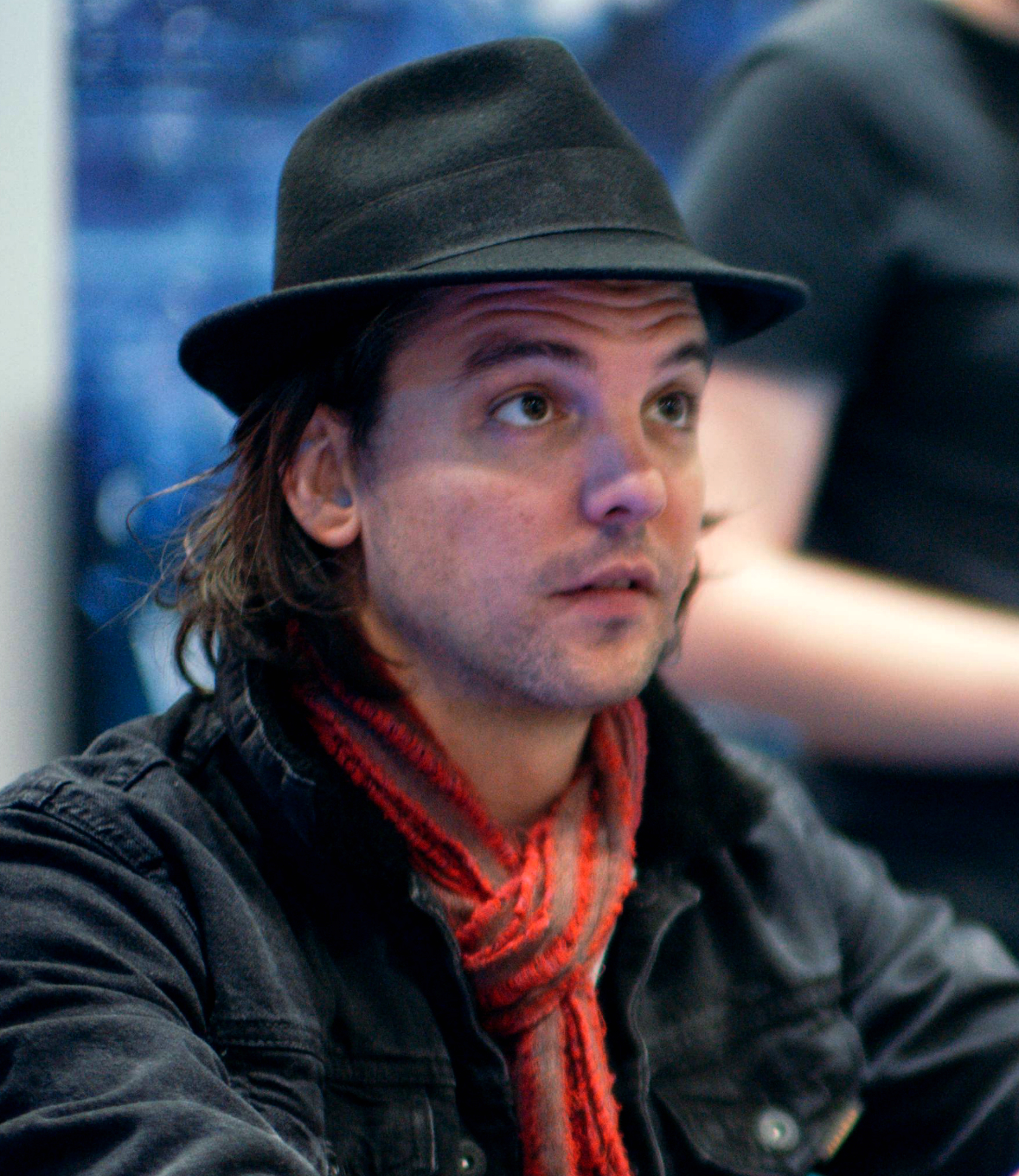
- Potts in 2016
- Born: 29 October 1979 (age 46); Bradford, West Yorkshire, England, United Kingdom
- Other names: Andrew Lee Potts; Andrew Potts; Pottsy
- Occupations: Actor; director
- Years active: 1989–present
- Height: 5 ft 10 in (1.78 m)
- Spouse: Mariama Goodman (m. 2014; div. 2020)
- Partner(s): Hannah Spearritt (2007–2013); Katie Sheridan (2021–present)
- Children: 2
- Relatives: Sarah-Jane Potts (sister)
- Website: keychainproductions.co.uk

Andrew-Lee Potts (born 29 October 1979) is an English actor and director. He is best known for his role as the quirky Connor Temple on ITV's British science fiction programme Primeval and Space's Canadian spinoff Primeval: New World. He also starred as the Hatter on the SyFy mini-series Alice and was a series regular on the long-running programme Ideal. Since 2006, Potts has written and directed short films through his production house, Keychain Productions. In 2008, he directed a documentary about the filming of Primeval called Through the Anomaly.

== Early life ==
Potts was born and raised in Bradford, West Yorkshire. His parents are Alan and Susan Potts, and he has one sister, actress Sarah-Jane Potts, with whom he attended Bradford's Scala Kids stage school. He studied at Intake High School Arts College, in Leeds, which specializes in performing arts. Potts left school at 16 to pursue acting full-time.

== Acting career ==
=== Early appearances ===
Potts started in drama classes at age seven and was cast pretty quickly in small shows that were based in Northern England. At ten years old, he made his first television appearance in Children's Ward. When he was 18, he landed a small role in HBO's Band of Brothers. He played Private Eugene Jackson, a character who is killed by a wound from his own grenade. Potts appeared steadily on television after that. In 2003, he appeared on two critically acclaimed programmes: twice on Buried and then the recurring role of Toby in six episodes of Strange. The same year, he appeared as Nero in the feature film Boudica. The following year, he was cast as Jonathan Chadwick for two episodes of Fat Friends. In 2006, Potts played a killer in a two-episode arc of Trial & Retribution. He had a role in the American movie Caffeine playing the ex-boyfriend of Katherine Heigl, an experience playing a stoner in comedy role that filmed prior to Ideal.

=== Ideal ===
Beginning in 2005, Potts joined the cast of the sitcom Ideal as drugged-out Lee, front man of the synth-pop band Silicone Valets (pronounced 'valleys') with a serious messiah complex. The show, which starred Johnny Vegas as a small-time dope dealer, was a cult favourite and ran for over 50 episodes and 7 series.

=== Primeval ===
In 2007, Potts originated the role of Connor Temple in the science fiction programme, Primeval. Although critically panned as campy on its debut, it became a hit show and pop cultural phenomenon. The storyline saw a team of scientists battling prehistoric and future beasts falling into the present through anomalies in time. Potts played geeky antihero Connor Temple, the vulnerable and innocent student of lead Nick Cutter (Douglas Henshall). "Connor just came really easy to me. It was something organic that I discovered quite naturally with the character and everyone on Primeval allowed me to run with that." During the course of programme, Potts became romantically coupled with co-star Hannah Spearritt both on-screen and off-screen, which garnered media attention for both the couple and the show.

Primeval relied heavily on special effects which made it a costly show to produce. It was cancelled due to financial considerations after its third season, despite very high ratings. Following a public appeal, the production company Impossible Pictures partnered with ITV and their corporate competitor, UKTV, to finance a renewal.

The show returned with five webisodes in late 2010. Series four and five followed, featuring Potts and Spearritt and co-star Ben Miller with additional new cast members including Ben Mansfield and Ciarán McMenamin. During the break in filming, Potts and Spearritt underwent a physical transformation to conform with the plotline of the programme, which had matured their characters. "I'd played Connor for a few years and in a way he was always kind of the underdog and told what to do. In series four and five, though, he stepped up a bit and wanted to show and prove what he could do and what Cutter believed was in him from the start...I'm very grateful for what the writers gave me to do and I just hope that I did the material justice."

In 2012, Potts reprised the character of Connor in the Canadian spinoff, Primeval: New World as an "organic link between the original mythology and the new series universe". He appeared in 2 of the series' 13 episodes (first and last) which were filmed in Vancouver. The reboot starred Niall Matter as Evan Cross with Crystal Lowe as Toby Nance, the character corollary to Potts' Connor in the original. Despite the popularity of the original in North America, the new programme was cancelled after its initial run. In the finale several plot points were wrapped up, including an allusion that Connor and on-screen partner Abby Maitland married. Pott's acting in this episode was especially well received; "Andrew Lee Potts as Connor continues to light up this episode with a great mix of humour and pathos and really makes the piece."

=== Alice ===
In 2009, Potts played the role of Hatter in the SyFy television miniseries Alice. Nick Willing wrote and directed the re-imagining of the Alice in Wonderland as a fantasy adventure. "Andrew Lee Potts does a fair job as the Hatter, who acts as Alice's guide through the craziness of Wonderland." The cast featured Caterina Scorsone in the title role, with Kathy Bates, Colm Meaney, and Matt Frewer. The programme received mixed reviews but Pott's acting in the roguish romantic role was considered a bright spot; "The true standouts here are Potts and Frewer, both of whom are exceptionally funny and charismatic." Despite the tepid critical response, Alice was a popular hit with high ratings and a 72% "fresh" rating at Rotten Tomatoes.

=== 2010-present ===
In 2009, Potts guest starred on an episode of Inspector George Gently as mixed-race young adult who is the chief suspect in his girlfriend's murder. In 2010, Potts appeared in the television adaptation of Kay Mellor's A Passionate Woman as the lead's (Billie Piper) adult son, Mark. In October 2011 he was featured in an episode of Doc Martin as Michael Dunwich; Born with a Shotgun.

Potts starred in the SyFy original movie True Bloodthirst (called Vampyre Nation or Vampire Nation in some markets) which was a "bloody, violent, traditional vampire movie". Pott's character was a descendant of Jonathan Harker, one of the protagonists of Bram Stoker's original Dracula story. It was broadcast in the summer of 2012.

In October 2012 Potts appeared onstage in Dracula with Max Wrottesley and Charlie Bond at the Leicester Square Theatre. Directed by Adam Morley, the drama was part of seasonal horror festival.

In 2013, Potts was cast in the BBC crime procedural By Any Means. The programme, which features Warren Brown, is a 6-parter about a team of elite cops.

In 2018, Andrew completed filming for the role of Barnes on short film Chimera, directed by award winner Patrick Ryder.

In 2019, Andrew was cast to play astronaut Michael Collins in the Netflix series The Crown.

== Directing ==
In 2006, Potts created Keychain Productions with Alex Moss and Tony Denman. The low-budget production house has released a variety of shorts, including; Blood on Benefits, Idance! and Colour Blind . Two of his films have been nominated for Virgin Media Short Film Awards: Little Larry in 2012 and Atwood Alley in 2013.

In 2008, Potts spent 5 months directing a behind-the-scenes documentary, Through the Anomaly, for Primeval. Potts found the direction of a documentary to be a new challenge; "I started directing. It's something that I want to do. I started directing short films. The producers saw the short films - and the "making of" the year before was quite dry - and came to me, which was funny because I was asking the same question. So they gave me a camera and off I went and never stopped filming, trying to capture as many moments as I could." Produced by Potts and Ross, the documentary was broadcast before being released as part of the Primeval series DVD.

== Personal life ==
Potts met Hannah Spearritt in 1997 and they dated briefly. In 2006, they were both cast in Primeval, and later rekindled their relationship. Potts proposed while they were on a holiday in Mallorca in 2008. The couple owned a home in London, where they lived with their dog, Stanley. However, the relationship ended in early 2013, as confirmed by Potts. In addition to Primeval, the couple collaborated in several Keychain Productions shorts and appeared together at 2013's Midlands Comic Con. On 20 August 2014, Potts married singer Mariama Goodman. He has one step-daughter born to Mariama in 2011. The couple have a son Grayson, born on 17 August 2016.

== Filmography ==
Year	Film	Role	Notes
1989	The Ward	Scott	TV series
1992	WYSIWYG	Philip	TV series
1993	Heartbeat	Roger Platt	TV series (1 episode: "Missing")
1995	The Biz	Leo	TV series
1997	Hetty Wainthropp Investigates	Shane Broderick	TV series (1 episode: "Fisticuffs")
1998	Lost in France	Craig	TV short
1999	Sunburn	Darren Priestley	TV series (1 episode: "Episode #1.1")
1999	Dalziel and Pascoe	Nicholas Richmond	TV series (1 episode: "Time to Go")
1999	Rage	B–Boy at the Elephant	
2000	New Year's Day	Jake	
2000	Anchor Me	Mikey Carter	TV movie
2001	The Bunker	Pvt. Neumann	
2001	Band of Brothers	Pvt. Eugene Jackson	TV mini-series (1 episode: "The Last Patrol")
2002	High Speed	Rafael	
2002	The Ride	Rafael	
2002	Stranded	Jacob Robinson	TV movie (Part 2 of movie)
2002	Night Flight	Tommy Atwell	TV movie
2002	The American Embassy	Tom Hobert	TV series (1 episode: "Driven")
2003	Buried	Henry Curtis	TV series (2 episodes)
2003	The Poet	Rick	
2003	Strange	Toby	TV series (6 episodes)
2003	Boudica	Nero	
2003	Absolute Power	Jimmy Bart	TV series (1 episode: "Mr Fox")
2003	Foyle's War	Dan Parker	TV series (1 episode: "The Funk Hole")
2004	Fat Friends	Jonathan Chadwick	TV series (2 episodes)
2004	Rose and Maloney	Daniel Berrington	TV series (1 episode: "Episode #1.1")
2004	Nature Unleashed: Avalanche	Jock	Video
2005	Rude Awakenings	Jake	Short
2005	Twisted Tales	Joey	TV series (1 episode: "Flat Four")
2005	Dead Fish	Abe Klein	
2005	Dipper	The Dipper	Short
2005	Ideal	Lee	TV series (17 episodes: 2005-2009)
2006	Taggart	Samuel Buckland	TV series (1 episode: "Law")
2006	Caffeine	Mike	
2006	Trial & Retribution	Michael Summerby	TV series (2 episodes: 2006-2007)
2007	Popcorn	Kris	
2007	Blood on Benefits	Lucas	Short
2007	1408	Mailbox Guy	
2007	Cold Blood	Jed Cooper	TV series (1 episode: "Dead and Buried")
2007	Return to House on Haunted Hill	Kyle	Video
2007-2011	Primeval	Connor Temple	TV series (Main role; 36 episodes)
2008	Heart of a Dragon	Don	
2008	Freakdog	Kenneth	Red Mist
2009	Inspector George Gently	Jimmy Cochran	TV series (Episode: "Gently in the Blood")
2009	Alice	The Hatter	TV mini-series (2 episodes)
2010	A Passionate Woman	Mark	TV series (1 episode: "Episode #1.2")
2011	Doc Martin	Michael	TV series (1 episode: "Episode #33")
2012 / 2013	Primeval: New World	Connor Temple	TV series (2 episodes: "episode 1.1" and "episode 1.13")
2012	True Bloodthirst	Johnathon "Johnny" Harker	SyFy Original Movie
2013	By Any Means	Thomas Tomkins	TV series
2013	Dracula	Gabriel Hood	TV series (Episode: "Goblin Merchant Men")
2014	The Mill	William Greg	TV series
2014	Wireless	Jacob Crow	Web series
2015	Midsomer Murders	Gideon Latimer	TV series (Episode "Murder by Magic")
2016	Stan Lee's Lucky Man	Tim Larson	TV series
2016	House of Salem	Mr. Downing	Movie
2017	The Hatching	Tim	Movie
2018	Chestersberg	DCI Waits	Movie
2018	The Innocents	Shane	TV series (Episode: "Bubblegum & Bleach")
2018	Chimera	Barnes	Movie
2018	Eve	Liam Carroll	Movie
2019	The Crown	Michael Collins	TV series (Episode: "Moondust")
2019	Homeless Ashes	PJ	Movie
2019	Red Claw Way	Bark	
2024	Drained		Movie
2024	Bogieville	John	
2026	Missed Call	Mark Jones	TV series
