= List of Discovery Channel original programming =

The following is a list of television programs currently or formerly broadcast by Discovery Channel.

== Current programming ==
The following programs are currently airing on Discovery Channel:

- 120 Hours Behind Bars (2026–present)
- Bering Sea Gold (2012–present)
- Conspiracies & Coverups (2026–present)
- Contraband: Seized at the Airport (2024–present)
- Contraband: Seized at the Border (2023–present)
- Deadliest Catch (2005–present)
- East Harbor Heroes (2025–present)
- Expedition Files (2024–present)
- Expedition Unknown (2015–present)
- Expedition X (2020–present)
- Filthy Fortunes (2025–present)
- Ghost Adventures (2023–present, moved from Travel Channel)
- Ghost Adventures: House Calls (2024–present, moved from Discovery+)
- Gold Rush (2010–present)
- Gold Rush: Mine Rescue with Freddy & Juan (2022–present, moved from Discovery+)
- Homestead Rescue (2016–present)
- Homestead Rescue: Intervention (2026–present)
- How to Catch a Dirtbag (2026–present)
- Hustlers Gamblers Crooks (2024–present)
- In the Eye of the Storm (2024–present)
- In the Eye of the Storm: Chasers (2026–present)
- Jeff Dunham's The Cars That Drove Us (2026–present)
- The Last Captains (2025–present)
- The Last Woodsmen (2024–present)
- Moonshiners (2011–present)
- Moonshiners: Master Distiller (2020–present)
- Mud Madness (2024–present)
- Mysteries of the Abandoned (2017–present)
- Mysteries of the Abandoned: Hidden America (2022–present)
- Mystery at Blind Frog Ranch (2021–present)
- Naked and Afraid (2013–present)
- Naked and Afraid: Apocalypse (2025–present)
- Naked and Afraid: Global Showdown (2026–present)
- Naked and Afraid: Shipwrecked (2026–present)
- Red Bull Soapbox Race (2025-present)
- Street Outlaws: Locals Only (2023–present)
- Street Outlaws: No Prep Kings (2018–2022, 2025–present)
- Street Outlaws: No Prep Kings: The Great 8 (2022, 2025–present)
- Truck Dynasty (2025–present)

== Upcoming programming ==
- Escape from Alcatraz (TBA)

== Former programming ==
=== 0–9 ===
- 18 Wheels Across Africa (2020)
- 18 Wheels Across America (2017–2022)
- 18 Wheels Across Australia (2014)
- 18 Wheels Across India (2025)
- 18 Wheels Across Indonesia (2019)
- 18 Wheels Across Route 66 (2019)
- 18 Wheels Across South Africa (2023)
- 18 Wheels Across Vietnam (2019)
- 100 Days Wild (2020)
- 2057 (2007)
- 9/11 Firehouse (2013)

=== A ===
- Africa (2013)
- Aaron Needs a Job (2019)
- Adrenaline Rush Hour (2009)
- After the Climb (2007)
- Airplane Repo (2010–15)
- Air Pressure (2015)
- Airshow (2015)
- Alaska: The Last Frontier (2011–22)
- Alaskan Bush People (2014–22)
- Alaskan Steel Men (2013)
- Alien Encounters: Fact or Fiction (2024)
- Alien Planet (2005; special)
- All on the Line (2020)
- All the President's Men Revisited (2013)
- America's Backyard Gold (2024)
- American Casino (2004–05)
- American Chopper (2003–20)
- American Guns (2011–12)
- American Hot Rod (2004–08)
- American Loggers (2009–11)
- American Treasures (2011)
- American Made Inventors (2017)
- Amish Mafia (2012–15)
- American Muscle (2014)
- American Tarzan (2016)
- American Underworld (2011)
- Ancient Rome: The Rise and Fall of an Empire (2006)
- Animal Face-Off (2004)
- Animals on Drugs (2025)
- Apocalypse Preppers (2013)
- Arctic Rescue (2015)
- Argo: Inside Story (2013)
- Arthur C. Clarke's Mysterious Universe (1994–95)
- Assignment Discovery
- Atlas 4D (2010)
- Auction Kings (2010–13)

=== B ===
- Backyard Oil (2013)
- Bad Chad Customs (2019–20)
- Bad Universe (2010)
- The Ballad of Big Al (2000)
- Barbarians: Secrets of the Dark Ages (2002)
- BattleBots (2018–23)
- Beachbody
- Beast Tracker (2012)
- Bee Czar (2022)
- Before We Ruled the Earth (2003)
- Bermuda Triangle Exposed (2011)
- Beyond 2000 (1985-99)
- Beyond Tomorrow
- Big! (2004)
- The Big Brain Theory (2013)
- Big Little Brawlers (2024)
- Biker Build-Off (2002–07)
- Billion Dollar Secret (1999)
- Billy Buys Brooklyn (2022)
- Bizarre Dinosaurs (2009)
- Blood and Oil (2013)
- Blue Collar Bankers (2016)
- The Blue Planet (2001)
- Blueprint for Disaster (2004–08)
- Bone Detectives (2007–08)
- The Bond (2022)
- Brainiac: Science Abuse (2003-08)
- Breakout (2010)
- Brew Masters (2010)
- Brink of Disaster (2022)
- Building the Future (2007)
- Building the Great Pyramid (2002)
- Building the Ultimate (2005)
- Built for Champions
- Bush Tucker Man (1992)

=== C ===
- Cal Fire (2021)
- Canada's Worst Driver (2005–18)
- Canada's Worst Handyman (2006–11)
- Carfellas (2011)
- Cash Cab (2005–18)
- Caught! (2023–24)
- Ciężarówką przez Chile (2026)
- Ciężarówką przez Malezję (2025)
- Chop Shop London Garage
- Choppers
- The Colony (2009–10)
- Colosseum: Rome's Arena of Death (2004)
- Connect
- Construction Intervention (2010)
- Contact (2019)
- Contraband: Seized at Sea (2024)
- Crash of the Century (2005)
- Curiosity (2011–13)
- Curious and Unusual Deaths
- Curse of Akakor (2021)
- The Curse of Tutankhamen (1999)
- A Cut Above (2022)

=== D ===
- Daily Planet (1995–2018)
- Dangerman: Adventures of Geoff Mackley (2004)
- Daring Capers (1999–2001)
- Dark Fellowships: The Vril (2008)
- Deadliest Catch: Bloodline (2020–22)
- Deadliest Catch: Dungeon Cove (2016)
- Deadliest Catch: The Viking Returns (2022)
- Deadly Women (2003–05)
- Dead Men's Tales (2003)
- Dealers (2012)
- The Death of Yugoslavia (1995)
- Deception with Keith Barry (2010)
- Decoding Disaster (2007)
- Designer Guys (2001-08)
- Destinations of the Damned with Zak Bagans (2024–25)
- Destroyed in Seconds (2008–09)
- The Detonators (2009)
- The Devils Ride (2012-14)
- Diagnosis: Unknown (2002)
- Diesel Brothers (2016–22)
- Diesel Brothers: Diesel Nation (2020)
- Dino Hunters (2020–21)
- Dinosaur Planet (2003)
- Dinosaur Revolution (2011)
- Discover Magazine (1996–2000)
- Discovery Atlas (2006–08)
- Dirty Jobs (2003–12, 2020–23)
- Dirty Mudder Truckers (2019–21)
- Disaster Detective
- Disaster Eyewitness (2011)
- Doctorology (2007)
- Dodgeball Thunderdome (2020)
- Doing DaVinci (2009–10)
- Doomsday (2008; special)
- Doomsday Bunkers (2012)
- Double Agents (2003-04)
- Download: The True Story of the Internet (2008)
- Dragons: A Fantasy Made Real (2004)
- Driven (2020)
- Dual Survival (2010–16)
- Dude, You're Screwed (2013–14)

=== E ===
- Earthflight
- Easy Does It (1991–96)
- Eco-Challenge (2001)
- Eco-Tech (2003)
- Edge of Alaska (2014–17)
- End Day
- Engineering Volcanoes
- Equinox
- Escape Stories (2001)
- Everest: Beyond the Limit (2006–09)
- Everything You Need To Know
- Exhibit A: Secrets of Forensic Science
- Expedition Bigfoot (2023–25, moved from Travel Channel)
- Expedition Borneo
- Expedition to the Edge (2020)
- Explosions Gone Wrong
- Extreme Engineering (2003–2011)
- Extreme Machines (1997)
- Extreme Peril
- Extreme Smuggling (2013)
- Extreme Survival

=== F ===
- Fangs!
- Fast N' Loud (2012–20)
- The FBI Files (1998–2006)
- Fearless Planet (2007)
- The Feuding Tombs of Christopher Columbus
- Fields of Armor
- Fight or Die
- Fight Quest (2007–08)
- The Final 24
- Finding Escobar's Millions (2017–19)
- Fireballs from Space
- Firehouse USA: Boston (2005)
- Firepower
- First Life (2010)
- A Fishing Story with Ronnie Green (2017)
- Flying Heavy Metal (2005)
- Flying Wild Alaska (2011–12)
- Food Factory
- Forensic Detectives (1999–01)
- Frontiers of Construction
- Frontiers of Flight
- Frozen Planet (2011)
- Full Force Nature
- Full Metal Challenge
- FutureCar
- The Future Is Wild
- Future Weapons (2006–08)

=== G ===
- Game Changers (2024)
- Game of Stones
- Garage Takeover
- The Garden: Commune or Cult (2023)
- Getaway Driver (2021)
- Ghost Adventures: Screaming Room (2024, moved from Travel Channel)
- Ghost Lab (2009–11)
- Giant Squid: Caught On Camera
- Globe Trekker
- Gold, Lies & Videotape (2023)
- Gold Rush: Dave Turin's Lost Mine (2019-22)
- Gold Rush: Parker's Trail (2017–24)
- Gold Rush: White Water (2018–25)
- Gold Rush: Winter's Fortune (2021)
- Gold Star Racing
- Great Bear Stakeout (2013; special)
- The Great Biker Build Off
- The Greatest Ever (2005)
- Green Village
- Growing Belushi (2020-23)
- Guardians of the Glades (2019–20)
- Guinea Pig
- Gutbusters (2002)

=== H ===
- Harley and the Davidsons (2016)
- A Haunting (2005–07)
- The Haunting in Connecticut (2003)
- Hard To Kill (2018)
- Harpoon Hunters (2025)
- Hazard Pay
- Heirs to the Dare (2014)
- Heroes (2006)
- Hidden
- Hidden Kingdoms (2014)
- Hijack El Al Flight 426
- Hoffman Family Gold (2022–24)
- Hogs Gone Wild
- The Holocaust: In Memory of Millions
- Home Matters
- Homestead Rescue: Raney Ranch (2020–21)
- Hooked on Fishing (1999)
- How Beer Saved the World (2011)
- How Booze Built America (2012)
- How Do They Do It?
- How Does It Work?
- How It's Made (2001–2019)
- Howe & Howe Tech (2010–11)
- How the Universe Works (2010)
- How to Survive
- How We Invented The World (2013; miniseries)
- Huge Moves
- Human Body: Pushing the Limits (2008)
- Human Planet (2011)
- Hunting Atlantis (2021)

=== I ===
- Ice Cold Catch (2022–23)
- Iditarod: Toughest Race on Earth (2008)
- The Impossible Row (2020)
- In the Wild with Harry Butler
- Incredible India!
- India with Sanjeev Bhaskar
- Industrial Revelations (2002–04)
- Inside Planet Earth
- Instinto Asesino
- Interior Motives
- Into Alaska with Jeff Corwin
- Into the Lion's Den (2004)
- Into the Universe with Stephen Hawking (2010)
- Into the Unknown with Josh Bernstein (2008)
- I Quit (2020)
- Is Born
- I Shouldn't Be Alive (2005–06)
- Is It Possible? (2010)
- It Takes a Thief (2005–07)
- I, VIDEOGAME
- I Was Bitten

=== J ===
- Jeremy Wade's Dark Waters (2019)
- JFK: The End Of Camelot
- Josh Gates Tonight (2020–22)
- Jungle Gold (2012–13)
- Junkyard Wars (2001–03)
- Justice Files

=== K ===
- Killing Fields (2016–18)
- Klondike (2014)
- The Know Zone (1995)
- Korea: The Forgotten War
- Krakatoa: The Last Days

=== L ===
- L.A. 10,000 B.C. (2004)
- LA Ink (2007–11)
- Land of Giants / The Giant Claw
- Land of the Mammoth (2001)
- The Last Alaskans (2016–19)
- Last Day of the Dinosaurs (2010; special)
- The Last Huntsmen (2013)
- Last Man Standing (2007)
- Legend Detectives (2005)
- Legends of the Wild (2020)
- Licence to Drill
- Life
- The Life of Mammals (2002)
- Life Story
- Lobster Wars (2007)
- Lobstermen (2009)
- Lone Star Law (2020, 2022)
- Lost Animals of the 20th Century
- Lost Monster Files (2024)
- Lost Relics of the Knights Templar (2020–21)
- The Lost Ship of Venice (2006)
- The Lost Tomb of Jesus (2007)
- Louisiana Law (2022, moved to Animal Planet)
- Lynette Jennings Design

=== M ===
- Magic of Science
- Mammal Revolution
- Mammals vs. Dinosaurs
- Manhunt: Unabomber (2017)
- Man vs. Bear (2019–20)
- Man vs. Wild (2006–11)
- Man, Woman, Wild (2010–12)
- Mark Rober's Revengineers (2023)
- Marooned with Ed Stafford (2013)
- Massive Engines
- Massive Machines
- Master of Arms (2018)
- Masters of Disaster (2019)
- Mega Builders (2005–10)
- Mega Engineering
- Miami Ink
- Mind, Body & Kick Ass Moves
- Miracle Planet
- Misfit Garage (2014–18)
- Modern Gladiators
- Moment of Impact
- Mongrel Nation (2003)
- Monkey Business
- Monster: A Portrait Of Stalin In Blood
- Monster Garage (2002–06)
- Monster House (2003–06)
- Monsters Resurrected (2009)
- Moonshiners: American Spirit (2022)
- Moonshiners: Whiskey Business (2019)
- Most Evil (2006–08)
- Mostly True Stories: Urban Legends Revealed
- Mummy Detective with Bob Brier (2004)
- My Shocking Story
- Mysteries of the Deep (2020-22)
- The Mysterious Death of Cleopatra (2006)
- MythBusters (2003–16)

=== N ===
- Naked and Afraid Castaways (2023)
- Naked and Afraid: Last One Standing (2023–25)
- Naked and Afraid: Solo (2023)
- Naked and Afraid XL (2015–24)
- Nasty by Nature
- The Natural World
- Nature by Design
- Nature's Deadliest
- Nature's Great Events (2009)
- The New Al-Qaeda
- The New Detectives (1996–2005)
- The Next Step (1991–96)
- NextWorld
- Nigel's Wild Wild World
- Nightmare Next Door
- Normandy: The Great Crusade

=== O ===
- Ocean Odyssey
- Oddities
- One Car Too Far (2012)
- One Man Army (2011)
- On the Inside (1999-2001)
- One Step Beyond
- One Way Out (2008–09)
- On the Run
- Out In The Cold
- Outback Lockdown (2020)
- Outback Opal Hunters (2019–2025)
- Outlaw Empires (2012; miniseries)
- Outrageous Acts of Science: You Have Been Warned
- Overhaulin' (2012–15)

=== P ===
- Pagans
- Passport to Space
- Patent Bending (2006)
- People Watch
- Perfect Disaster (2006)
- PitchMen (2009–11)
- Planes That Never Flew
- Planet Earth (2006)
- Point of No Return (2002)
- Pompeii: Killer In Our Midst (2005)
- Pompeii of the East (2005; special)
- Pompeii: The Last Day (2003)
- Pop Nation
- Portraits
- Pot Cops (2013)
- Prehistoric
- Prehistoric Park
- Prehistoric Planet
- Profiles of Nature
- Property Wars (2012–13)
- Prototype This! (2008–09)
- Pyramid Beyond Imagination (2002)
- The Patiala Necklace (2004)
- The Prosecutors: In Pursuit of Justice

=== R ===
- Ragin' Cajuns (2012)
- Raging Planet
- Raising the Mammoth
- Raising Wild (2019)
- Rally Round the House
- Raw Nature
- Ray Mears' The Real Heroes of Telemark (2003; special)
- Ray Mears' World of Survival (1997–98)
- The Reagan Legacy
- The Real American Cowboy
- The Real Eve
- Really Big Things
- Reclaimed (2020)
- Redwood Kings
- Reporters At War (2003)
- Resurrection Tomb Mystery (2012)
- Rex Hunt's Fishing Adventure (1991–2004)
- Rides
- Rise of the Video Game (2007)
- Rivals
- River of No Return (2019)
- Road Trip USA
- Robotica
- Rob Riggle: Global Investigator (2020)
- Rocket Around the Xmas Tree (2020)
- Rocket Science
- Royal Deaths & Diseases (2003–04)
- RTL Autowereld

=== S ===
- Sacred Steel Bikes
- Safari
- Saint Hoods (2013)
- Salvage Squad
- Sasquatch: Legend Meets Science
- Savage Builds (2019)
- The Science of Sex Appeal
- Sci-Fi Saved My Life
- Sci-Trek
- Scrapheap Challenge
- Sea Monsters
- Secrets of SEAL Team Six
- Serengeti (2019–21)
- Seven Wonders of...
- Sex Sense (2004; miniseries)
- Sewer Divers (2023)
- Siberian Cut (2014)
- Silver Rush (2013)
- Sin City Tow (2024)
- Sinking of the Lusitania: Terror at Sea
- Skywire Live
- Smash Lab (2007–08)
- Solving History with Olly Steeds (2010)
- Some Assembly Required
- Son of God
- Sons of Guns
- Space Odyssey
- Stealth Secrets (2005)
- Sticker Shock (2018)
- Storm Chasers (2007–11)
- Storm Warning
- Story of India
- Stranded with Cash Peters
- Street Outlaws (2013–23)
- Street Outlaws: America's List (2021–22)
- Street Outlaws: End Game (2022)
- Street Outlaws: Farmtruck and AZN (2022)
- Street Outlaws: Farmtruck and AZN Down Under (2023)
- Street Outlaws: Fastest in America (2020–23)
- Street Outlaws: Mega Cash Days (2023)
- Street Outlaws: Memphis (2018–21)
- Street Outlaws: New Orleans (2016–17)
- Street Outlaws: No Prep Kings: Team Attack (2021)
- Street Outlaws: Race Night in America (2020)
- Street Outlaws vs. The World (2023)
- Stunt Junkies
- The Sun
- Superstorm
- Super Structures of the World (1998)
- Supervolcano
- Super Weapons of the Ancient World (2005)
- Surprise by Design
- Survive the Raft (2023)
- Survive This
- Survivorman (2005-08)
- Swamp Brothers (2011–12)
- Swamp Loggers (2009–12)
- Swords: Life on the Line (2009–11)

=== T ===
- Tales from the Explorers Club (2022)
- Tanks!
- Tanks! The Aces (2005)
- Test Case (2006)
- Texas Car Wars (2012)
- This Is Mark Rober (2023)
- Tilt 23 1/2
- Time Warp (2008–09)
- Titanic: Anatomy of a Disaster
- Top Gear (2010–16)
- Top Marques
- Top Ten (2004–05)
- Tournament
- Tracking Africa's Dinosaurs (2002)
- Trading Spaces (2018-19)
- Travelers
- Treasure!
- Treasure Quest: Snake Island (2015–18)
- Tribe (2005-07)
- True Horror with Anthony Head (2004)
- The Truth About Killer Dinosaurs (2005)
- Twin Turbos (2018–20)

=== U ===
- UFOs: Down to Earth (1997)
- Ultimate Car Build-Off
- Ultimate Cars
- The Ultimate Guide
- The Ultimate Ten
- Unchained Reaction (2012)
- Undercover Billionaire (2019–21)
- Under Siege: America's Northern Border (2013)
- Understanding
- Universe
- Unsolved History (2002–05)
- Untamed Africa

=== V ===
- Valley of the T. rex (2001)
- Vegas Rat Rods (2014–18)
- Verminators (2008–09)
- Viking Voyages: Wings of the Dragon (2005)

=== W ===
- Walking with Beasts
- Walking with Cavemen
- Walking with Dinosaurs
- Walking with Monsters
- Warlocks Rising
- Warrior Women
- Watergate (1994)
- Weaponizers
- Weapon Masters (2007)
- Weapons of War (series)
- Weed Country (2013)
- Weed Wars (2011)
- Weird Nature (2002)
- Weird or What?
- What's That About?
- Wheeler Dealers (2011–15)
- When Dinosaurs Roamed America (2001)
- When Dinosaurs Ruled
- When We Left Earth: The NASA Missions (2008)
- Why Didn't I Think of That?
- Why We Hate (2019)
- Wild & Weird America (2024)
- Wild Brazil (2014)
- Wild Discovery (1995–2002)
- Wild New World (2002)
- Wild Pacific
- Wild Weather (2002; miniseries)
- Wildlife Chronicles
- Wings
- Wolves at Our Door (1997)
- A World Away
- World Birth Day (2002–03)
- World Class Cuisine
- World of Wonder
- World's Biggest And Baddest Bugs (2004)
- The World's Strangest UFO Stories
- World's Top 5 (2012)
- World's Toughest Fixes
- The World's Toughest Tunnel (2005)
- Worst-Case Scenario (2010)
- Wreckreation Nation (2009)

=== X ===
- X-Machines
- X-Ray Mega Airport (2015)

=== Y ===
- You Spoof Discovery (2007)
- Yukon Men

=== Z ===
- Zero Hour
