= Cyberdreams (disambiguation) =

Cyberdreams is a defunct American video game developer.

Cyberdreams may also refer to:

- Cyberdreams, a 1995 French anthology by G. David Nordley
- Cyberdreams, a 2002 album by Westworld
- Isaac Asimov's Cyberdreams, a 1994 anthology edited by Gardner Dozois and Sheila Williams
- "Hello Cyberdream", a song composed by Richard Wolf for Scooby-Doo and the Cyber Chase
