= Denis Ostier =

French actor (born 1993)

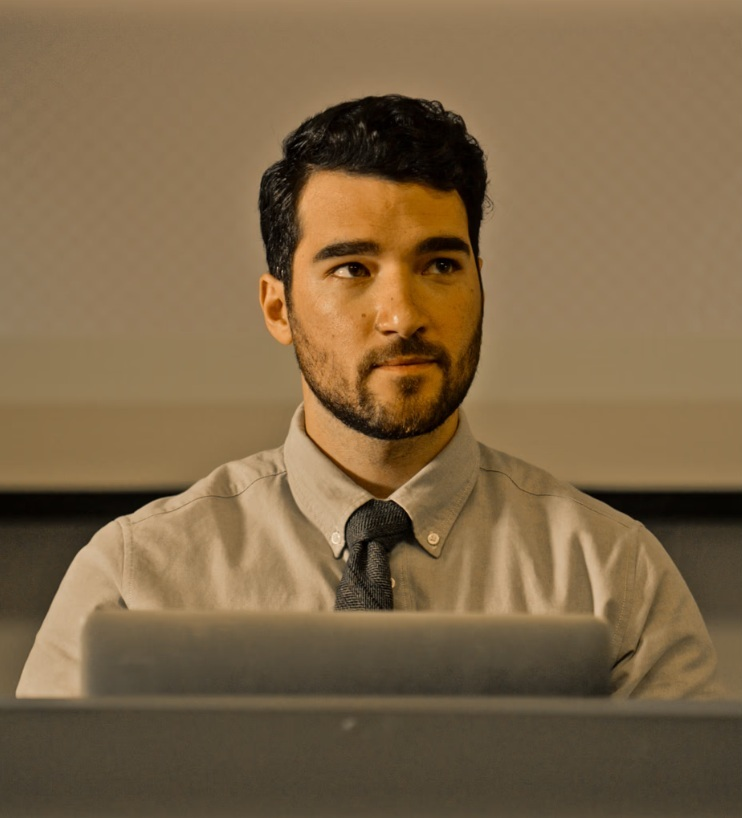
- Denis Ostier (2025)
- Born: 1993 (age 32–33); Paris, France
- Education: University - Acting International
- Occupation: Actor
- Years active: 2019–present
- Known for: Exodus (2025 film)

Denis Ostier (born 1993) is a French actor. He is best known for his leading role as Hakan Arikan in the 2025 political drama film Exodus, directed by British-Turkish filmmaker Serkan Nihat.

== Early life and education ==
Ostier was born in Paris, France, in 1993. He studied acting at Acting International in Paris between 2014 and 2017, a theatre school known for its multilingual and multidisciplinary approach.

== Career ==
Ostier began acting professionally in 2019, performing in a range of short films and independent productions in French, English, and Turkish. His early screen credits include the short films Humains (2020), À Terre (2020), Bloody Mary (2021), and Lipstick (2022).

In 2022, Ostier was cast in the lead role of Hakan Arikan, a Turkish academic in exile, in Exodus (2025), a political drama about migration and identity directed by Serkan Nihat. The film premiered worldwide on 20 June 2025 across major digital platforms including Apple TV and Amazon Prime Video. It was awarded "Best Drama" at the 2025 London Independent Film Festival.

Ostier also appeared as the lead actor in the 2023 Christmas advertisement for the smartphone brand HONOR, titled "Unsung Heroes".

== Filmography ==
=== Feature films ===
- Exodus (2025) – Hakan Arikan (lead role)

=== Short films ===
- Humains (2020) – Sam
- À Terre (2020) – William
- Bloody Mary (2021) – James Randall
- Look at Me (2022 - short) – Jason
- Lipstick (2022) – Pierre

=== Television ===
- Qu’une Famille (2019) – Fajitas (1 episode)

=== Video games ===
- Days Gone (2020) – Deek

=== Commercials ===
- HONOR Christmas Advertisement – "Unsung Heroes" (2023) – Lead
