= Cannes Corporate Media & TV Awards =

- Location: Cannes, France
- Established: October 2010
- Awards: Grand Prix, Gold, Silver, Black and Blue Dolphin Awards
- Website: cannescorporate.com

The Cannes Corporate Media & TV Awards are an international festival dedicated to corporate films, online media productions and documentaries, that takes place every September in Cannes, France. It is often referred to as one of the most important festivals in the corporate film industry. The first festival took place in 2010. The current Festival Director is Austrian businessman Alexander V. Kammel who is also the director of the International Committee of Tourism Film Festivals (CIFFT) and many other festivals.

The world's best corporate productions and international documentaries are rewarded with Dolphin Trophies in Gold and Silver. The Grand Prix is selected from all the Gold Dolphin winners. A total of 61 categories exists, and winners are selected by a new jury every year, often including Oscar and Emmy winners.

== Categories ==
The festival has a total number of 61 different categories, which are divided into five main groups: Corporate Films and Videos, Corporate Online Media, Documentaries and Reports (TV, Online, Cinema), Production Arts & Crafts and Students. The list of categories may be updated from year to year in accordance with the audiovisual industry trends.

== Awards ==
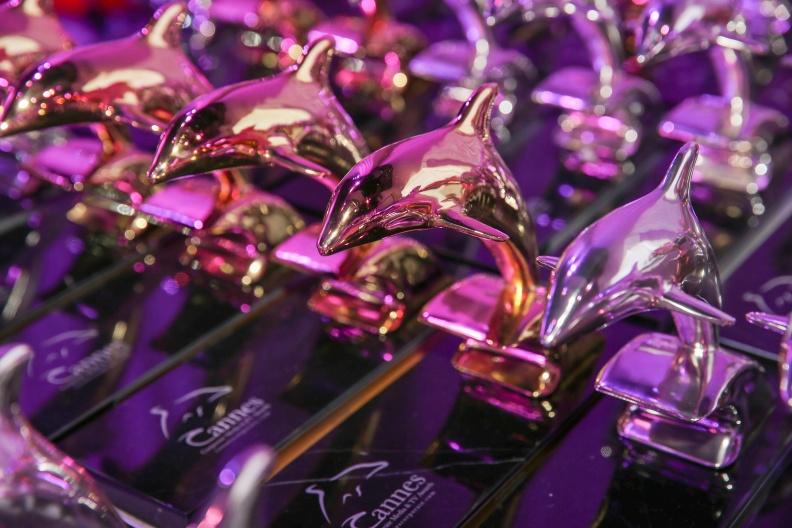
A photo of Gold and Silver Dolphin Trophies

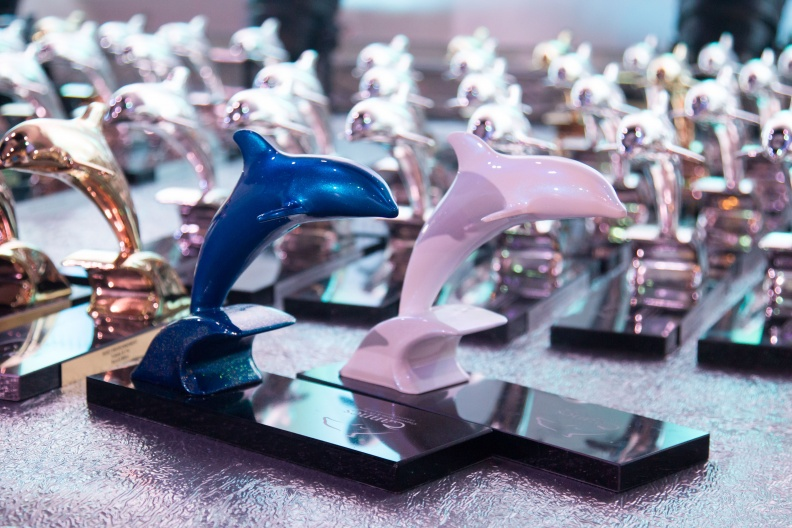
The photo of Blue Dolphin and the White Grand Prix Dolphin

In the last years of the Award's history, the winners were awarded Silver, Gold, Black or White Dolphins. The outstanding artworks were rewarded with the Silver and Gold Dolphins. The Production Arts & Crafts category winners received Black Dolphins. The Grand Prix – awarded to the best production of the festival – is a White Dolphin. The Grand Prix will be awarded to the films selected among the Gold Winners. From 2015, the festival has a new trophy for the best production company, the Blue Dolphin.

=== Grand Prix winners ===
- 2023: Studying is what you make of it! - Directed by Mirjam & Lukas Fröhlich (Switzerland)
- 2022: Sustainable living, together. The Achmea way. - Directed by Hugo Keijzer (Netherlands)
- 2021: Applaus reicht nicht aus - Directed by Marvin Litwak (Germany)
- 2020: THE BLUE WAY next exit — Drees & Sommer - Directed by Maximilian Buck (Germany)
- 2019: Traditional craftsmanship meets contemporary design - Directed by Hans Hartmann & Leo Beisert (Germany)
- 2018: Losing Mr Renton - Directed by Tracey O'Halloran / Media Zoo (United Kingdom)
- 2017: The Heart of Trade - Directed by Malcolm Green (United Kingdom)
- 2016: Jus des Idées - Directed by Sun Sheau Huei (Singapore)
- 2015: The Heartbeat of Switzerland - Directed by Stephan Usteri (Switzerland)
- 2014: Das Leben braucht Mut - Directed by Tobias Fueter (Switzerland)
- 2013: Barossa. Be Consumed - Directed by Jeffrey Darling (Australia)
- 2012: A Day of Reflection - Produced by Conspiração Filmes (Brasil)
- 2011: Interviews of STI Stars - Produced by McCann Paris (France)
- 2010: A Timeless Mystery - Directed by Pieter-Rim de Kroon (Holland)

=== Notable Gold Dolphin winners ===
- 2016: David Attenborough's Life That Glows - Directed by Joe Loncraine for BBC.
- 2014: Tales From The Organ Trade - Directed by Ric Esther Bienstock for HBO.
- 2013: The Resurrection Tomb Mystery - Directed by Simcha Jacobovici.
- 2012: We Are Maersk - Directed by Christoffer Boe.

=== Notable Silver Dolphin winners ===
- 2018: Barclays Campaign – Directed by Serkan Nihat (United Kingdom).

== Awards Gala ==
The Awards Gala takes place in Cannes, France, every year in September. The evening before the Awards Ceremony, the winners from all over the world get together during the Welcome Evening, on the beach of the InterContinental Carlton. The day of the Awards Ceremony begins with the Media Center, where all submitted videos can be seen. The main evening starts with the Welcome Champagne leading the Awards Gala Dinner. The two-day event ends with the Dolphin Lounge open bar.
