= Dawid Andres =

Polish television personality, traveler, and lorry driver

- Born: 7 January 1981 (age 45); Gorzów Wielkopolski, Poland
- Occupations: television personality, traveler, lorry driver
- Years active: 2017–present

Dawid Andres (Polish: [ˈda.vit ˈand.rɛs]; born 7 January 1981) is a television personality, traveller, and a lorry driver. He is best known as the host of the travel documentary series 18 Wheels Across America (2017–2022), in which he drives in an articulated lorry across the United States.

== Biography ==
Dawid Andres was born on 7 January 1981 in Gorzów Wielkopolski, Poland, where he grew up. In his youth, he wanted to travel the world. To do so, he quit university and began working on international passenger ships. Later, he emigrated to the United States, where he began working as a lorry driver.

In 2015 and 2016, Dawid Andres and his half-brother Hubert Kisiński crossed South America on mountain bikes and home-made hydrocycles. They began their journey in Camaná, Peru, from where they have biked through Andes, to Atalaya, Peru. There, on the Ticllacocha lake, they switched onto the hydrocycles and travelled to Iquitos, Peru, via rivers, which eventually merged into the Amazon River. They travelled alongside it across Brazil, ending their journey on the Atlantic Ocean near Belém. The trip took about 6 months, and they are assumed to be the first to cross the Amazon River on hydrocycles.

For their accomplishment, they won the Kolos award in the "best feat" category, at the All-Poland Traveler, Sailor and Mountaineer Meetings in Gdynia, Poland, the largest annual traveller festival in Europe. At the ceremony, Andres was noticed by television producers, who proposed to him his own television program. This led to him hosting the TVN and Discovery Channel Poland travel documentary series 18 Wheels Across America, aired from 2017 to 2022. In the show, he is driving a articulated lorry across the United States. He also hosted its several spin-off miniseries: 18 Wheels Across Route 66 (2019), 18 Wheels Across Vietnam (2019), 18 Wheels Across Indonesia (2019), 18 Wheels Across Africa (2020), Ciężarówką przez RPA (2023), Ciężarówką przez Australię (2024), Ciężarówką przez Indie (2025), and Ciężarówką przez Malezję (2025). He also hosted a travel documentary series Na tropie dzikich zwierząt airing from 2021 to 2023.

== Private life ==
Andres is married and has children. His wife is an American of Filipino descent. He resides in Arizona, United States.

== Filmography ==
=== Television programmes ===
- 2017–2022: 18 Wheels Across America
- 2019: 18 Wheels Across Route 66
- 2019: 18 Wheels Across Vietnam
- 2019: 18 Wheels Across Indonesia
- 2020: 18 Wheels Across Africa
- 2021: Dawid Andres z buta
- 2021–2023: Na tropie dzikich zwierząt
- 2023: Ciężarówką przez RPA
- 2024: Ciężarówką przez Australię
- 2025: Ciężarówką przez Indie
- 2025: Ciężarówką przez Malezję
