= Murat Kesgin =

Turkish producer, screenwriter, media executive and broadcaster

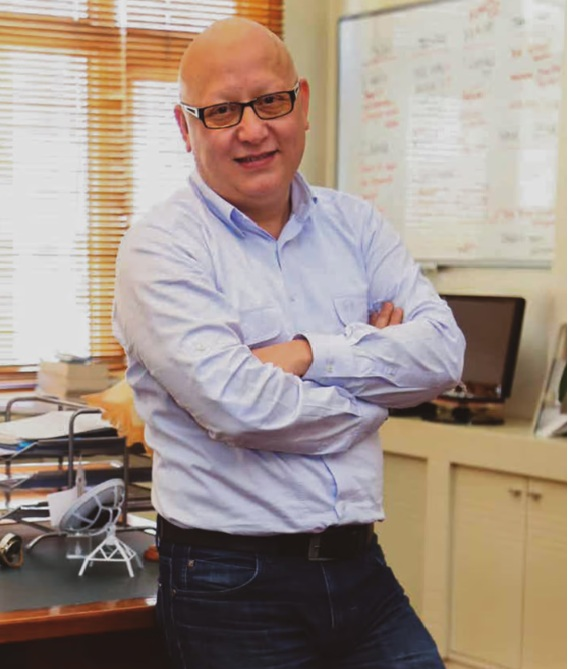
- Born: November 16, 1971 (age 54); Turkey
- Occupations: Television producer; Screenwriter; Media executive; Broadcaster
- Years active: 1993–present
- Notable work: Exodus (2025 film); Selam: Bahara Yolculuk (2015 film); Selam (2013 film); Küçük Gelin (TV series, 2013–2015); Sakarya Fırat (TV series, 2009–2013)

Murat Kesgin (born 16 November 1971, Turkey) is a Turkish film producer, screenwriter, media executive, and television broadcaster. Since the 1990s, he has been involved in various media production, broadcasting, and content management projects in Turkey, Kenya, and the United Kingdom.

== Early life and education ==
Murat Kesgin was born on 16 November 1971 in Turkey. He completed primary school at Bayrampaşa Vatan Primary School (1977–1982), middle school at Bayrampaşa RC Secondary School (1982–1985), and high school at Üsküdar Cumhuriyet High School (1985–1988). He earned his undergraduate degree from Ankara University, Faculty of History, between 1989 and 1993.

== Career ==
- In 1993, he began his media career as a reporter in the Samanyolu TV News Department.
- He then served as Istanbul News Editor, Ankara Political News Chief, and News Department Coordinator.
- From 2005 to 2006, he worked as Program Coordinator at Star TV.
- Between 2006 and 2010, he was Editor-in-Chief at Mehtap TV.
- From 2010 to 2016, he worked as Editor-in-Chief of Samanyolu TV, overseeing editorial quality and broadcast strategy.
- In 2016, he served as CEO of Ebru TV in Kenya.
- Since 2021, he has been working as freelance Production Director and CEO at the London-based production company Red Clapper.

== Notable projects ==
- Exodus (2025 film)

A political drama film co-written and produced by Kesgin, depicting the story of three professionals accused of terrorism after the 2016 coup attempt in Turkey who flee with other migrants in search of safety and freedom. Directed by Serkan Nihat, and co-written with Ilhan Gökalp and Refik Güley, the film was shot in English, Turkish, and Kurkish. Runtime: 1h 44min. Released in 2025.

- Little Bride (Turkish: Küçük Gelin, on Turkish Wikipedia)

A TV series written and produced by Kesgin, it tells the story of a 13-year-old girl forced into marriage in Southeastern Turkey to save her sibling. Aired between 2013–2015, the series addressed forced child marriage and societal pressure.

- Torn Between Two Worlds (Turkish: İki Dünya Arasında, on Turkish Wikipedia)

A drama series exploring themes of migration, identity, and cultural synthesis, portraying the struggles and relationships of different characters.

- The Shadow of the Plane Tree (Turkish: Çınarın Gölgesinde, on Turkish Wikipedia)

Set in a small Anatolian town, this series focuses on family dynamics, generational conflicts, and social values, forming a bridge between past and present.

- Selam (film) (Turkish: Selam (film), on Turkish Wikipedia)

A 2013 film based on real events, portraying young teachers who go to unfamiliar countries to teach and help others. Set across Afghanistan, Senegal, and Bosnia.

- Selam: Journey to Spring (Turkish: Selam: Bahara Yolculuk, on Turkish Wikipedia)

A 2015 sequel based on the story of İsmail, a young teacher from Turkey who tries to establish a school in Kyrgyzstan. Runtime: approx. 2h 6min.

- Kehkeşan Magazine (2014)

As Editor-in-Chief, Kesgin worked on editorial strategy, interviews, and cultural content.

- Yeşil Elma Yemek Dergisi - Green Apple Food Magazine (2015)

He worked as coordinator, focusing on content planning and thematic editorial direction.

== Awards ==
- London Independent Film Festival Best Drama Award: Received for the film Exodus.

== Conferences and professional development ==
- Samanyolu TV News Reporting Conference (2004)
- Ebru TV (USA) Content and Broadcast Planning (2012)
- Hazar TV (Azerbaijan) Ratings Analysis and Broadcast Planning (2013)
- Ebru TV Kenya Ratings Analysis and Broadcast Planning (2013)
