= Impossible Pictures =

British television production company

- Industry: TV Production
- Founded: 2002
- Founder: Tim Haines
- Headquarters: London
- Area served: United Kingdom
- Website: impossiblepictures.co.uk/productions/

Impossible Pictures Ltd. is a London-based independent TV production company founded in 2002 by Tim Haines.

Impossible Pictures began by producing documentary series using computer generated imagery with shows like Walking with Dinosaurs, Walking with Beasts and Space Odyssey to docu-dramas such as Perfect Disaster and Blitz Street to drama in the form of Primeval and Sinbad. Two further production houses are also part of Impossible Pictures Ltd. These are 360production, with its offices in Derry, Northern Ireland and Firestep, an animation company trading as Impossible Kids that works out of Manchester.

Productions have aired on UK networks including BBC, ITV, Sky TV and Watch, and overseas.

== List of productions ==
=== While part of BBC ===
- Walking with Dinosaurs (1999)
- The Ballad of Big Al (2001)
- Walking with Beasts (2001)
- The Lost World (2001)

=== As an Independent Company ===
- The Giant Claw (2002)
- Land of Giants (2003)
- Sea Monsters (2003)
- The Legend of the Tamworth Two (2004)
- Space Odyssey: Voyage To The Planets (2004)
- T-rex: A Dinosaur in Hollywood (2005)
- Walking with Monsters (2005)
- Pickles: The Dog who Won the World Cup (2006)
- Perfect Disaster (2006)
- Ocean Odyssey (2006)
- Prehistoric Park (2006)
- Frankenstein (2007)
- Primeval (2007-2011)
- Ways To Save The Planet (2009)
- Blitz Street (2010)
- Buzz & Tell (2010)
- Fleabag Monkeyface (2011)
- Sinbad (2011)
- Dragon Wars: Fire & Fury (2012)
- Primeval: New World (2012)
- Human Swarm (2012)
- The Great Martian War (2013)
- Dinosaurs in the Wild (live production) (2018)

=== As Loud Minds ===
- Surviving Earth (2026)

== Awards ==
=== British Academy Television Awards (BAFTAs) ===
- Walking with Dinosaurs: 1999 for Innovation
- Walking with Dinosaurs: 1999 for Best Original Television Music
- Walking with Beasts: 2001 for enhancement of linear media
- The Giant Claw: 2002 for visual effects

=== Emmys ===
- Walking with Dinosaurs: 1999-2000 for outstanding animated program
- The Ballad of Big Al: 2000-2001 for outstanding animated program
- Walking with Beasts: 2001-2002 for outstanding animated program
- Chased by Dinosaurs: 2002-2003 for outstanding animated program
- Walking with Monsters: 2005-2006 for outstanding animated program

=== Royal Television Society Awards (RTSs) ===
- Walking with Dinosaurs: 1999 for teamwork
- Walking with Beasts Online: 2001 for primary and secondary multimedia and interactive

=== TV and Radio Industry Award ===
- Walking with Dinosaurs: 2000 for documentary program of the year

=== Visual Effects Society Awards ===
- Walking with Monsters: 2005 outstanding visual effects in a broadcast miniseries, movie or special

=== Wildscreens ===
- Sea Monsters: 2003 for animal planet international award for popular broadcast program
- The Giant Claw: 2004 for parthenon entertainment award for innovation

=== Broadcast Film Critics Association Award ===
- Walking with Dinosaurs: 2000 for new program

=== Peabody Award ===
- Walking with Dinosaurs: 2000
