= Discovery Channel Poland =

- Country: Poland
- Broadcast area: Poland
- Headquarters: Media Business Centre; Warsaw, Poland

Programming
- Languages: Polish; English
- Picture format: 1080i HDTV (downscaled to 576i for the SD feed)

Ownership
- Owner: Warner Bros. Discovery EMEA
- Sister channels: Animal Planet; Discovery Science; Discovery Historia; Discovery Life; DTX; Investigation Discovery; TLC

History
- Launched: 1998; 27 years ago

Links
- Website: https://www.discoverychannel.pl

Discovery Channel Poland is a Polish television channel. It shows factual entertainment programming, just as its many siblings around the world.

Discovery Channel has been available in Poland at least since 1998 when the Wizja TV platform launched. The dedicated Polish schedule was launched in 2002.

The channel started using the new Discovery Channel logo on 1 July 2009.

With a share of overall viewing of 0.67 percent, the eponymous American cable channel was the 17th most watched television channel in Poland in 2011, according to Nielsen statistics. It is by far the most popular of the dedicated documentary channels available in Poland.

On 18 April 2012 Discovery Channel Poland started broadcasting in 16:9 picture format.

The HD version of the Discovery Channel Poland was launched on 17 January 2013 and replaced Discovery HD Showcase on all major TV platforms in Poland.
