= G. David Nordley =

American science fiction writer

G. David Nordley (born 1947 in Minneapolis) is a science fiction writer, physicist, and astronautical engineering consultant whose fiction writing is most associated with Analog Science Fiction and Fact. His fiction is under the name G. David Nordley, while his technical writing is under the name Gerald D. Nordley.

Nordley is a fellow of the British Interplanetary Society, and a senior member of the American Institute of Aeronautics and Astronautics. He is also an active participant of the Contact Conference, which is currently held every two years in Northern California.

His work Into the Miranda Rift was nominated for both the Hugo Award for Best Novella and the Nebula Award for Best Novella.

== Bibliography ==
=== Books ===
Title	Year	Published	Notes
The Black Hole Project (with C. S. Lowe)	2013	Variations on a Theme 2013	Based on "Kremer's Limit," "The Small Pond," "Imperfect Gods," "Loki's Realm," and "Vertex" in Analog 2006–2007
To Climb a Flat Mountain	2012	Variations on a Theme 2013	Earlier version published as a serial in Analog Part 1 – 129/11 (Nov 2009); Part 2 – 129/12 (Dec 2009)

=== Short fiction ===
Collections

- Nordley, G. David (2013). After the Vikings : tales of future Mars. Variations on a Theme.
- — (2015). After the Vikings : tales of future Mars. Reprint. Brief Candle Press.

Stories

Title	Year	First published	Reprinted/collected	Notes
The Snows of Venus (short story)	1991	Analog 111/6 (May 1991)		
A Democracy of Cannibals (short story)	1991	Midnight Zoo 1/5 (May/Jun 1991)		
A Calendar of Chaos (novelette)	1991	Analog 111/14 (Dec 1991)		
Morning on Mars (short story)	1992	Analog 112/7&8 (Jun 1992)		
In HIS Image (short story)	1992	Analog 112/9 (Aug 1992)		
Attraction (vignette)	1993	Analog 112/10 (Sep 1992)		
Barriers (short story)	1992	Fantasy & Science Fiction 82/5 (Oct/Nov 1992)		
P.C. Software (short story)	1992	Analog 112/13 (MidDec 1992)		
Poles Apart (novella)	1992	Analog 113/1&2 (Jan 1993)		
The Day of Their Coming (novelette)	1994	'Asimov's 18/3 (Mar 1994)		
Hunting the Space Whale (novelette)	1993	Tomorrow 1/4 (#4 1993)		
Into the Miranda Rift	1993	Analog 113/8&9 (Jul 1993)	The Year's Best Science Fiction: Eleventh Annual Collection, ed. Gardner Dozois (St. Martin's Press, 1994); The Hard SF Renaissance, eds. Kathryn Cramer & David G. Hartwell (Tor, 2002); The Mammoth Book of Mindblowing SF, ed. Mike Ashley (Running Press, 2009)	
Out of the Quiet Years (short story)	1994	Asimov's 18/8 (Jul 1994)		
Network (novella)	1994	Analog 114/3 (Feb 1994)		
Tin Angel (novella with H. G. Stratmann)	1994	Analog 114/8&9 (Jul/Aug 1994)		
Comet Gypsies	1995	Asimov's 19/3 (Mar 1995)		
His Father's Voice	1994	Analog 114/11 (Sep 1994)	Cyberdreams (French Anthology) 1995	
Karl's Marine and Spacecraft Repair (novellete)	1994	Analog 114/14 (Dec 1994)		
The Protean Solution (short story)	1994	Tomorrow 2/3 (Jun 1994)		Based on an image by Paul Lehr
Of Fire and Ice (novelette)	1995	Mindsparks (Spring 1995)		
Alice's Asteroid (short story)	1995	Asimov's 19/10 (Sep 1995)		
Dawn Venus	1995	Asimov's 19/11 (Oct 1995)	Isaac Asimov's Solar System, Dozois, Ace(1999)	
Final Review	1995	Analog 115/8&9 (Jul/Aug 1995)		
Martian Valkyrie	1996	Analog 116/1&2 (Jan 1996)		
The Kubota Effect	1996	Analog 116/6 (May 1996)		
Fugue on a Sunken Continent	1996	Analog 116/13 (Nov 1996)		
Messengers of Chaos	1997	Asimov's 21/1 (Jan 1997)		
This Old Rock	1997	Analog 117/4 (Apr 1997)		
From Every Opening Flower (novelette with Jonny Duffy)	1997	Analog 117/9 (Sep 1997)		
Crossing Chao Meng Fu	1997	Analog 117/12 (Dec 1997)	Year's Best SF, 15th Ed.,1998	
A Life on Mars	1998	Analog 118/7&8 (Jul/Aug 1998)		
Democritus' Violin	1999	Analog 119/4 (Apr 1999)		
Mustardseed (vignette)	1999	Asimov's 23/8 (Aug 1999)		
The Touch (short story)	1999	Age of Reason SFF.net (anth 1999)		
The Forest Between the Worlds	2000	Asimov's 24/2 (Feb 2000)		
Relic of Chaos	2001	Analog 121/1 (Jan 2001)		
Burdens	2001	Artemis #4 (Spring 2001)		
The Fire and the Wind	2003	Analog 123/7&8 (July/Aug 2003)		
Harpoon	2005	Analog 124/5 (May 2004)		
Voice of Ages (short story in anthology)	2006	Golden Age SF Hadley Rille (anth 2006)		
Kremer's Limit (novella with C.Sanford.Lowe)	2006	Analog 126/7&8 (Jul/Aug 2006)		
Imperfect Gods (novella with C.Sanford.Lowe)	2006	Analog 126/12 (Dec 2006)		
The Small Pond (novella with C.Sanford.Lowe) )	2007	Analog 127/3 (Mar 2007)		
Loki's Realm (novella with C.Sanford.Lowe)	2007	Analog 127/7&8 (Jul 2007)		
Hell Orbit (novelette in anthology)	2007	Visual Journeys Hadley Rille (anth 2007)		Based on an image by Wolf Read
Vertex (novella with C.Sanford.Lowe)	2007	Analog 127/9 (Sep 2007)		
The fountain	2013	Nordley, G. David (June 2013). "The fountain". Asimov's Science Fiction. 37 (6): 14–30.		Novelette
A Wartime Draught (novelette)	2013	How Beer Saved the World Sky Warrior (anth 2013)		

=== Critical studies and reviews of Nordley's work ===
- Klein, Jay Kay (February 1994). "G. David Nordley". BioLog. Analog. 114 (3).
