= Ümit Ülgen =

Turkish actor and photographer (born 1973)

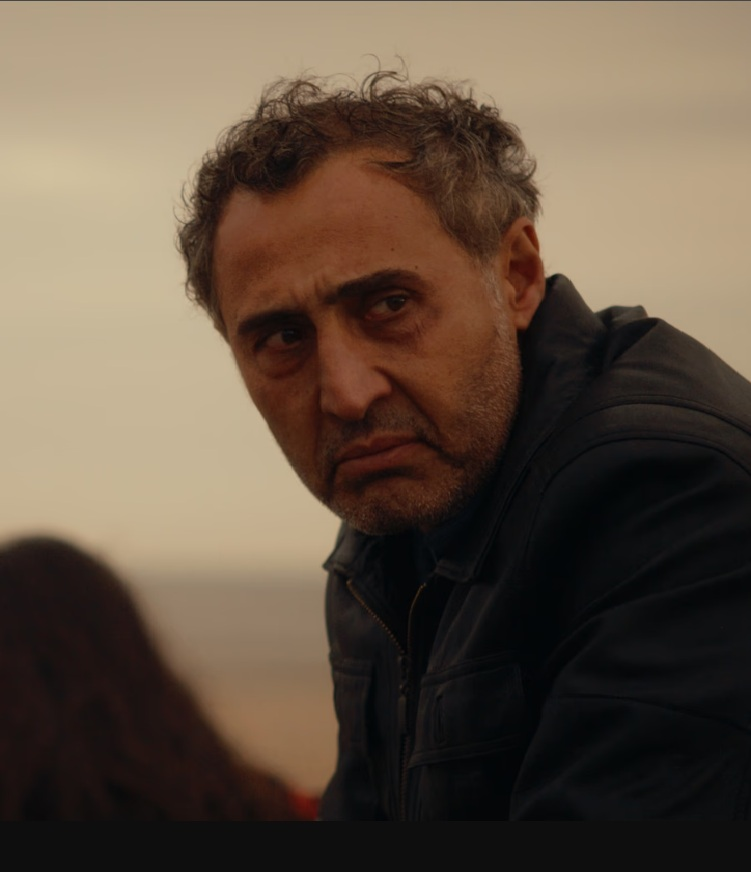
- Ümit Ülgen (2025)
- Born: 1 September 1973 (age 53); Ankara, Turkey
- Education: University of Plymouth (BA, Media Production)
- Occupations: Actor, photographer
- Years active: 2012–present
- Known for: Exodus, Spectre, Doctor Strange

Ümit Ülgen (born 17th of July 1969) is a Turkish actor and fine art photographer based in the United Kingdom. He is best known for portraying Mehmet Özdemir, a conflicted police officer, in the 2025 political drama Exodus. He has also had roles in international productions such as Spectre, Doctor Strange, and the BBC miniseries The Night Manager.

== Early life and education ==
Ülgen was born in Ankara, Turkey. He moved to the United Kingdom for higher education and studied Media Production at the University of Plymouth, where he developed interests in both acting and fine art photography. He won multiple award for his photography including BIPP student photographer of the year 2000 and 2001.

== Career ==
=== Acting ===
Ülgen began acting in the early 2010s, initially taking minor roles in short films and independent productions. His screen debut was in the indie film Different Perspectives (2012).

He later appeared in internationally recognized productions:

- Spectre (2015): Featured in a minor role as a train guard in the James Bond film.
- Doctor Strange (2016): Portrayed a mystic character known as Mater Sol Rama.
- The Night Manager (2016): Appeared as a taxi driver in one episode of the BBC series.

He became the first Turkish actor to play a character in a Marvel film in 2016 with the role of Sol Rama in Dr Strange. His breakthrough performance came in the 2025 political thriller Exodus, where he plays a leading role as Mehmet Özdemir, a principled Turkish police officer navigating a climate of repression following the 2016 coup attempt. The film was released on 20 June 2025 (World Refugee Day) and received the Best Drama Feature award at the London Independent Film Festival.

=== Photography ===
Ülgen has expressed interest in fine art photography, though little public documentation is available about his work or exhibitions.

== Filmography ==
=== Film ===
Year	Title	Role	Notes
2012	Different Perspectives	Captain Jarvis	Short film
2015	Spectre	Train Guard	Minor role
2016	Doctor Strange	Sol Rama	Master of the Mystic Arts of Kamar-Taj
2025	Exodus	Mehmet Özdemir	Leading role

=== Television ===
- The Night Manager (2016) – Taxi Driver
