= Space Odyssey (TV series) =

- Cover of the original UK DVD release
- Also known as: Voyage to the Planets and Beyond; Walking with Spacemen
- Genre: Fictional documentary Drama
- Created by: Joe Ahearne; Christopher Riley
- Narrated by: David Suchet
- Composer: Don Davis
- Country of origin: United Kingdom
- Original language: English
- No. of episodes: 2

Production
- Executive producers: Tim Haines; Adam Kemp
- Producer: Christopher Riley
- Cinematography: Nick Dance
- Editor: Jason Krasucki
- Running time: 60 minutes
- Production company: Impossible Pictures

Original release
- Network: BBC, Discovery Channel, ProSieben
- Release: 9 November 2004

Space Odyssey: Voyage to the Planets, marketed as Voyage to the Planets and Beyond in the United States, is a 2004 two-part fictional documentary created by Impossible Pictures and produced by BBC Worldwide, Discovery Communications and ProSieben. Space Odyssey chronicles a fictional crewed voyage throughout the Solar System, which is used to convey scientific information on spaceflight and on the different planets. The programme was initially announced under the title Walking with Spacemen as an instalment in the Walking with... franchise of documentaries. Though the title was changed before release and its connection to the other Walking with... programmes was removed, it was broadcast under the original title in Canada. The special effects and scientific accuracy of Space Odyssey was praised by critics, though some criticism was leveled at the storylines and drama portions of the programme.

== Plot ==
=== Part One ===
At an unspecified point in the near future, five astronauts, commander Tom Kirby, engineer Yvan Grigorev, medic John Pearson, geologist Zoë Lessard, and exobiologist Nina Sulman depart Earth orbit on a mile-long nuclear-powered spaceship, Pegasus. Six weeks later, Pegasus arrives in orbit around their first destination, Venus, where Lessard and Grigorev pilot the lander Orpheus to the surface, where Grigorev conducts a short walk in a specially designed reinforced pressure suit while Lessard remains inside the lander. During the walk, Grigorev visits the nearby derelict Soviet lander Venera 14, which had arrived on Venus in 1982. He falls behind schedule, and, suffering from exhaustion and overheating, only narrowly makes it back to Orpheus. After successfully launching and docking with Pegasus, the crew depart Venus for Mars.

After arriving in Mars orbit, the crew rendezvous with a pre-placed supply ship to refuel Pegasus. Kirby, Pearson, and Sulman descend to the surface of Mars in the lander Ares, landing near Melas Chasma, a part of the Valles Marineris canyon system, where they intend to search for liquid water buried beneath the surface at the bottom of the canyon using a robotic rover (named Charlie) carried by a balloon. Upon landing, Kirby is hit by a dust devil, but he is not injured. Their first attempt at finding water is thwarted by a solar flare, which forces the astronauts on the surface to take shelter in Ares for a few days, while Lessard and Grigorev in orbit onboard Pegasus take shelter too. Once the danger has passed, the crew of Ares return to the edge of Melas Chasma, where Sulman successfully guides Charlie to the bottom of the canyon, successfully finding a small amount of liquid water buried under the ground. However, Lessard reports that a large dust storm is developing in the canyon, which threatens to ruin their mission. After retrieving the water sample, the astronauts once again take shelter in Ares. Once the dust storm has passed, Ares lifts off and rejoins Pegasus.

Departing Mars, the next destination of Pegasus is Jupiter, which they will reach by swinging near by the Sun to pick up speed. On the way towards the Sun, Pegasus passes by Mercury, however mission constraints prevent landing there. To protect them from the intense radiation of the Sun, an artificial magnetic field is generated around Pegasus, but the power requirements of the generator force them to turn off non-essential systems, such as their laboratory and the centrifuge that provides artificial gravity for their sleep compartments. The flyby is a success, and the crew head to Jupiter. On their way through the asteroid belt, the crew perform an unplanned close flyby of a binary asteroid system, which passes much closer than predicted owing to discrepancies in the data provided by mission control.

=== Part Two ===
Pegasus performs an intense aerobraking manoeuvre in Jupiter's upper atmosphere to put them on course for Io. En route to Io, Pearson receives a diagnosis of lymphoma, which he received from a high radiation dose during the solar flyby. Upon arriving in orbit over Io, the primary landing site is considered unsafe due to an ongoing volcanic eruption, as is the secondary landing site due to lethal levels of radiation. After a heated discussion at mission control over whether to land at the still potentially risky tertiary landing site, or to land at the safe but uninteresting quaternary landing site, the decision is made to land at the more interesting site, but the mission duration is cut to reduce radiation exposure. Lessard then descends alone to Io in the lander Hermes. On the surface, she quickly becomes exhausted in her heavy radiation-shielded spacesuit. With the radiation levels climbing, Lessard is ordered by the crew to abort her walk. Returning to Hermes, she leaves all the samples she had collected behind. Pegasus then encounters Europa, where they send a robotic probe to the surface to collect sub-surface ice samples.

Their mission around Jupiter complete, Pegasus embarks on the long journey to Saturn. However, Pearson's condition continues to worsen, weakening him severely. Upon arriving at Saturn, Pegasus enters orbit around its largest moon, Titan, where they release a robotic probe to collect samples, however the probe malfunctions and is lost. Leaving Titan, Pegasus is placed in an orbit in the Cassini division, where Sulman performs a spacewalk to collect a fragment of Saturn's rings. However, during her spacewalk, Pearson dies. Subsequently, the remaining crew cut off communications with Earth for a whole day while they mourn Pearson and decide what to do next. During this period, Kirby sets adrift the body of Pearson into the rings of Saturn. Upon restoring contact, the crew reveals that they have decided to continue the mission (in the US version, they decide to return home), and they leave for Pluto shortly afterwards.

Arriving at Pluto, Kirby and Grigorev land on the surface in the lander Clyde, where they set up a telescope array to detect exoplanets, which they had modified on their journey from Saturn to Pluto, and the telescope is pointed at Earth for a calibration test. Before leaving Pluto, Kirby and Grigorev perform a short memorial service for astronauts who have died in the pursuit of space exploration, including Pearson, who was intended to land on Pluto with them. Clyde later ascends and docks with Pegasus. On the way back to Earth, they rendezvous with a fictional long-period comet, Yano-Moore. Lessard and Sulman pilot the lander Messier to collect samples, with Kirby, Grigorev and mission control observing increasing seismic readings from within the comet. Sulman and Lessard continue their excursion, but the nucleus of the comet suddenly breaks apart. Sulman and Lessard liftoff aboard Messier to return to Pegasus, which itself is struck by fragments of debris of the destructing comet and severely damages the spacecraft. Kirby tends to an oxygen leak while Grigorev is injured by comet debris. Unable to contact the damaged Pegasus, Lessard and Sulman abandon Messier and spacewalk to the airlock. After performing emergency surgery on Grigorev to remove the comet fragment from his lung, the three able astronauts repair Pegasus and commence on the final journey home. Finally, after six years away, Pegasus and her crew arrive home to Earth.

== Cast ==
Pegasus crew

- Martin McDougall as Tom Kirby, Mission Commander. Pilot and navigator, responsible for navigation and guiding secondary crafts to and from planet surfaces. His decisions are final in event of loss of contact with Mission Control.
- Rad Lazar as Yvan Grigorev, Flight Engineer. Highly trained in computer systems, mathematics, physics, chemistry and meteorology. Second in command.
- Joanne McQuinn as Zoe Lessard, Mission Scientist. Specialised in hydrology, geology, geomorphology, geochemistry, meteorology and remote sensing. In charge of supplies, food and water.
- Mark Dexter as John Pearson, Flight Medic. Medical doctor also trained in biology and geological sciences. Official mission biographer and media liaison person and also responsible for monitoring personal and environmental health.
- Michelle Joseph as Nina Sulman, Mission Scientist. Specialised in biology and chemistry (in particular organic chemistry) and trained in emergency medicine. In charge of the equipment for experiments and its storage, logging and preparation.

In order to ensure that the actors portraying the Pegasus crew were playing convincing astronauts, the production team put the actors through a "Space School", where they received a crash course in spaceflight and space exploration and went through team-building exercises. Among the tutors were David Scott (astronaut; commander of Apollo 15), Jean-Pierre Haigneré (astronaut), Chris Welch (spacecraft engineer and astronautics lecturer) and Kevin Fong (co-director of the centre for extreme environment medicine at the University College London). The actors also spent a week at the Yuri Gagarin Cosmonaut Training Center in Russia, where they spent time in spacecraft simulators, floated around a full-scale space station mock-up, and practised space walks in a neutral buoyancy tanks. They also took a flight on a reduced-gravity aircraft in their spacesuits and experienced the effects of zero gravity.

Mission control

- Mark Tandy as Alex Lloyd, Chief Scientist. Inter-disciplinary scientist with the goal to get as much science as possible out of every step of the mission.
- Hélène Mahieu as Claire Granier, Chief Flight Surgeon. Responsible for the health of the crew, works through consulting with the on-board Flight Medic John Pearson.
- Colin Stinton as Fred Duncan, Flight. Director of the mission, has extensive knowledge on the systems and objectives in the mission.
- John Schwab as Larry Conrad, Capcom. An experienced astronaut familiar with the challenges of the mission.
- Lourdes Faberes as Isabel Liu, Flight Dynamics Officer. Oversees the engine burns used to get in and out of orbits and on to the correct trajectories for flights between the planets.

== Production ==
=== Walking with Spacemen ===
Space Odyssey entered into pre-production in January 2003 and was first announced on 26 March that year, set for a September 2004 release. The title for the programme was announced to be Walking with Spacemen, set to be produced by Tim Haines and Jasper James of Impossible Pictures. Haines and James are the creators of the Walking with... franchise of documentary series on prehistoric life, having made the previous series Walking with Dinosaurs (1999) and Walking with Beasts (2001) together.

Though it would differ considerably from the other Walking with... programmes in its settings and subject matter, the series was seen as the natural progression of the Walking with... franchise, which had gone from Walking with Dinosaurs (the age of the dinosaurs) to Walking with Beasts (the age of the mammals) to Walking with Cavemen (2003; human evolution) and would now step into the future. Walking with Spacemen was also connected to the other series through its creators (Haines and James) and through using scientific knowledge and special effects to create a dramatic yet informative programme. The BBC announced Walking with Spacemen as set to consist of two 50-minute programmes whereas some other sources, such as Variety, reported that it would consist of six 30-minute episodes.

The release of the series was delayed for a few months and by October 2004, Walking with Spacemen had been retitled as Space Odyssey. Though still involving Impossible Pictures and Haines, now executive producer, James had left the project. The press pack released on 10 October that year no longer made any connection between Space Odyssey and the Walking with... series beyond the involvement of Haines and Impossible Pictures. The new title instead connected the programme to the then in-development series Ocean Odyssey (2006). Alongside Haines, Space Odyssey was now produced by Christopher Riley, with Adam Kemp also serving as executive producer. Despite the title change, Space Odyssey was still referred to as Walking with Spacemen also after its release in some sources and it aired in Canada under the original working title. The soundtrack of the series, released by composer Don Davis, still referred to the main theme as the "Walking with Spacemen theme".

=== Research and advisors ===
In order to produce the most realistic and accurate vision possible of human exploration of the different worlds visited in Space Odyssey, the production team used facts collected on hundreds of different robotic missions, including details concerning rock formations, gravity fields and atmospheres. Numerous scientists and astronauts were consulted for the programme, including the aforementioned David Scott, Jean-Pierre Haigneré, Chris Welch and Kevin Fong, alongside astronaut Reinhold Ewald, space author David Baker, space physicist Michele Dougherty, mathematician and astronomer Carl D. Murray, astrobiologist Charles S. Cockell, SETI coordinator Alan Penny, astronomers David Hughes and Francisco Diego, plasma physicist Andrew Coates, atmospheric physicists Stephen R. Lewis and Peter Read, and Adrian Russell, Head of Concepts at the European Aeronautic Defence and Space company.

Areas lacking in scientific research also influenced choice made in the series; the malfunction of the probe aimed at Titan and the subsequent lack of exploration of the moon was a decision made due to then impending real landing mission by the probe Huygens on Titan (14 January 2005), which could have resulted in new findings making the portrayal of Titan in Space Odyssey inaccurate. Actual science also influenced the overall plot; the planets Uranus and Neptune are not visited in Space Odyssey since the planets were out of position to the path taken by the Pegasus.

=== Special effects ===
==== Sets, costumes and spacecraft ====
Most of the sets used in Space Odyssey were constructed by WonderWorks, a Los Angeles-based setbuilding company familiar with space movies. WonderWorks had previously worked on productions such as Apollo 13 (1995), From the Earth to the Moon (1998), Space Cowboys (2000), The Core (2003) and The Day After Tomorrow (2004). A set modelled on the International Space Station, previously used in The Day After Tomorrow was used in Space Odyssey, adapted for the lab areas of the Pegasus. The command centre of the Pegasus was a modified cockpit of a Space Shuttle. The sets were shipped from the United States to London and constructed at two studios. Some portions were later taken to Russia and re-built on board a reduced-gravity aircraft so that the actors could film while weightless.

The costumes used in the series were supplied by Global Effects, a Hollywood costume house that had also supplied space suits for Apollo 13, Contact (1997), Deep Impact (1998), Armageddon (1998), From the Earth to the Moon and Space Cowboys. In addition to the space suits from Global Effects, some scenes made use of real cosmonaut space suits; the producers believe that Space Odyssey was the first drama TV production to make use of real space suits. In addition to these authentic space suits, several props used in Space Odyssey were also real products developed for missions aboard the International Space Station, supplied to the production team by the European Space Agency and Roscosmos.

The spacecraft of Space Odyssey were designed by series consultant David Baker, engineers at the European Aeronautic Defence and Space Company (a real manufacturer of spacecraft) and the Art Department of the production team. Every spacecraft shown was designed to adhere to strict principles of spacecraft design and were based on technologies and designs already being researched at NASA. The Pegasus, for instance, incorporates a magnetic shield, a technology which at the time of production was already being experimented with at NASA.

==== Visual effects ====
The visual effects of Space Odyssey were created by the visual effects company Framestore, which had also worked on the Walking with... programmes.

== Reception ==
Henrietta Walmark gave Space Odyssey a mixed review in The Globe and Mail, writing that the drama portion of the programme was "a cheesy wannabe" but praised the special effects and scientific information, concluding that it "gets most of the science right and the fiction all wrong". Tariq Malik of Space.com praised Space Odyssey, particularly its special effects, though noted that some aspects in the programme, such as the mission only taking six years and some decisions made by the astronauts or mission control, were questionable. Dwayne A. Day of The Space Review also praised Space Odyssey, noting that "the production's devotion to realism and technical accuracy is virtually unmatched by any previous movie, with perhaps the exception of Apollo 13". Like Walmark, Day gave some criticism towards the drama, noting that the audience does not get to know the astronauts very well since Space Odyssey is more geared towards the science and criticising that the characters are placed in danger every time they land, a plot device he felt was used too frequently.

== In other media ==
=== The Robot Pioneers ===
Space Odyssey: Voyage to the Planets was accompanied by a 50-minute stand-alone documentary titled Space Odyssey: The Robot Pioneers, first broadcast on BBC Four on 9 November 2004. Like the main programme, The Robot Pioneers was created by Impossible Pictures and produced by the BBC, the Discovery Channel and ProSieben, though also in association with the Science Channel. The Robot Pioneers explores the real history of space exploration as well as the science behind Space Odyssey, telling the story of the unmanned robotic missions to the planets of the Solar System. The Robot Pioneers was directed by Christopher Riley, edited by Andy Worboys and narrated by David Suchet.

=== Companion book ===
A companion book to the series, also titled Space Odyssey: Voyage to the Planets was co-authored by Haines and Riley. The book was released in the United States under the title Voyage to the Planets and Beyond: A Space Exploration. The book is based on the fictional diary entries of the ground staff and crew on Pegasus, with supplementary factual information on the planets they visited and the real robotic missions which have explored them through history. It is illustrated with specially commissioned digital still images and screenshots taken from the programme.

=== Tour ===
The launch of Space Odyssey was accompanied by a tour, during which Christopher Riley traveled across the United Kingdom to host events for children seven and over in which he presented facts about the Solar System, the science behind Space Odyssey, unseen footage from the series and live demos.

=== Interactive version ===
Using BBCi (BBC Interactive Television), viewers could during the programme's original airing watch Space Odyssey with interactive features. Viewers could access the "Mission Report", a virtual mission control interface which included pup-up facts on the screen, as well as context and extra information for each scene.

=== Website ===
An accompanying website to Space Odyssey was launched in 2004, including information on the Pegasus and the other fictional spacecraft featured in the series, detailed profiles on the crew members and real scientific information. Also included on the website were games, including jigsaw puzzles and Space Doctor Interactive, in which players take the role of a doctor looking after astronauts on a mission to Mars.
