= Exodus (2024 film) =

2024 political drama film by Serkan Nihat

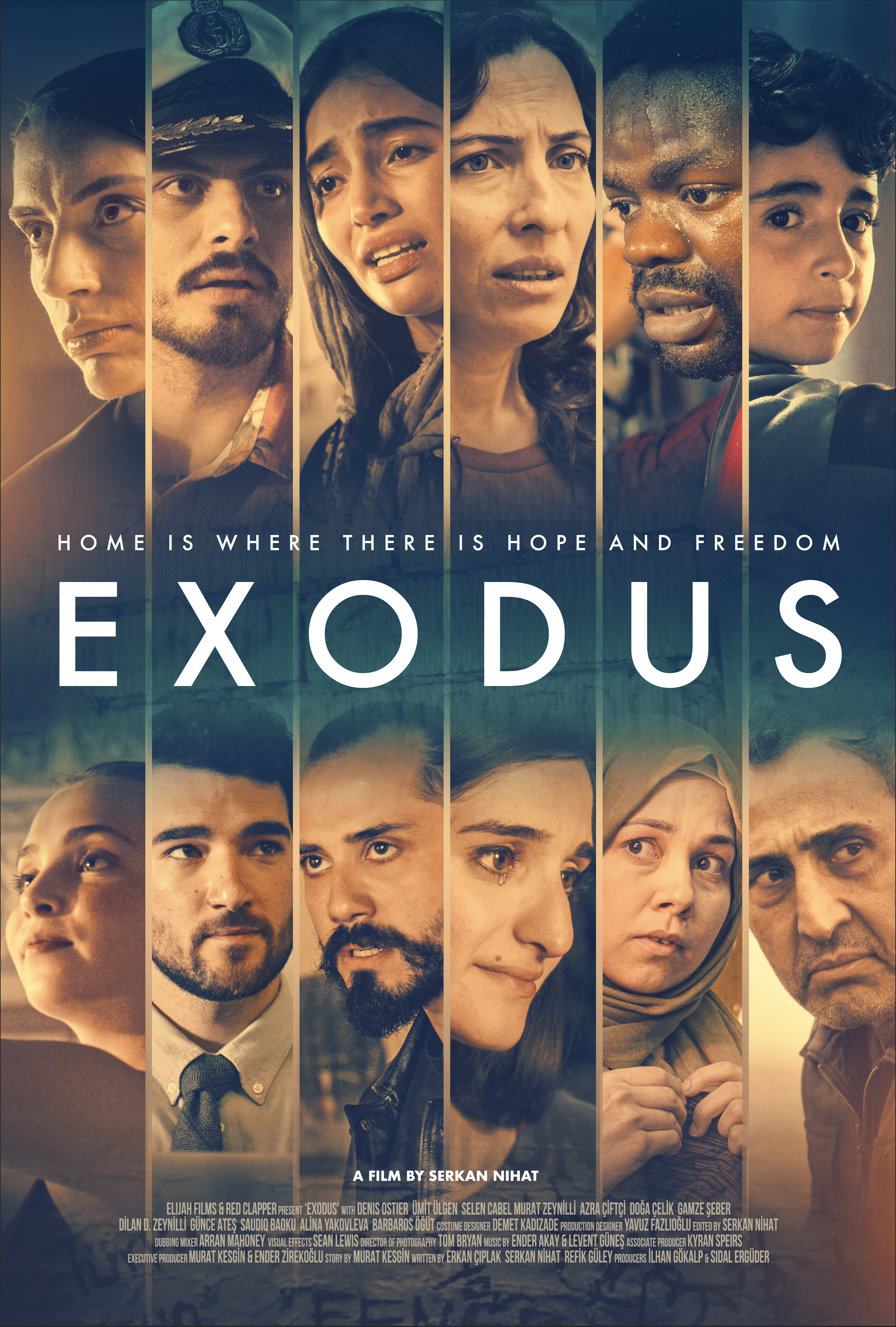
- Directed by: Serkan Nihat
- Written by: Erkan Çıplak, Refik Güley
- Screenplay by: Tom Bryan
- Produced by: Murat Kesgin; Ilhan Gokalp; Ender Zirekoglu; Sidal Ergüder; Amal Al Agroobi; Kyren Speirs
- Starring: Denis Ostier; Ümit Ülgen; Dilan Derya Zeynilli; Doğa Çelik; Selen Cabel; Azra Çiftçi; Murat Zeynilli; Günce Ateş; Gamze Özdemir; Saudiq Baoku; Alina Yakovleva; Barbaros Öğüt
- Production companies: Exoduskacisfilm Ltd; Red Clapper Ltd; Elijah Productions
- Distributed by: Amazon Prime Video; Apple TV; YouTube TV; Google Play; Vimeo
- Release dates: 2024 (festivals); 20 June 2025
- Country: United Kingdom
- Languages: English, Turkish

Exodus is a UK production dramatic film simultaneously released on digital platforms on 20 June 2025. The film depicts the experiences of an academic, a police officer, and a Kurdish artist who flee Turkey after the 2016 coup attempt.

== Plot ==
Exodus portrays the intertwined journeys of an academic, a police officer, and a Kurdish artist who become targets of escalating political repression in Turkey following the 2016 Turkish coup attempt. Labeled as "terrorists" by the state, the three protagonists are forced to abandon their families and flee the country through illegal means, living under the constant threat of arrest and imprisonment.

Their escape paths converge at a safehouse near the Greek border, where they encounter each other along with other displaced individuals, including Yazidi and Congolese refugees. Together, they navigate a perilous human smuggling network while confronting both their personal traumas and the authoritarian regime they are fleeing. The film highlights their shared struggle for justice, human rights, and freedom.

== Background ==
Exodus is a film inspired by real-life events that took place in Turkey between 2016 and 2023, particularly in the aftermath of the failed coup attempt in July 2016. Following the coup attempt, the Turkish government declared a state of emergency and issued emergency decrees that led to the closure of more than 2,000 institutions allegedly linked to the Gülen movement. These institutions included schools, universities, hospitals, media outlets, and humanitarian organizations.

More than 3 million people were investigated for terrorism charges based on criteria not defined in law. Tens of thousands, including journalists, academics, bureaucrats, and judges, were detained or arrested. In response to increasing political repression after the 2016 coup attempt, over 230,000 Turkish citizens had their passports revoked by authorities, with tens of thousands—many of them alleged members of the Gülen movement—reportedly leaving the country through irregular means to seek asylum in various European countries. Both government and migration research reports indicate that the majority of post-2016 Turkish asylum cases in European countries involved individuals facing state persecution linked to alleged Gülenist ties.

Exodus depicts the personal stories of individuals who were forced to flee Turkey under these conditions, offering a cinematic portrayal of political persecution and mass displacement.

== Awards ==
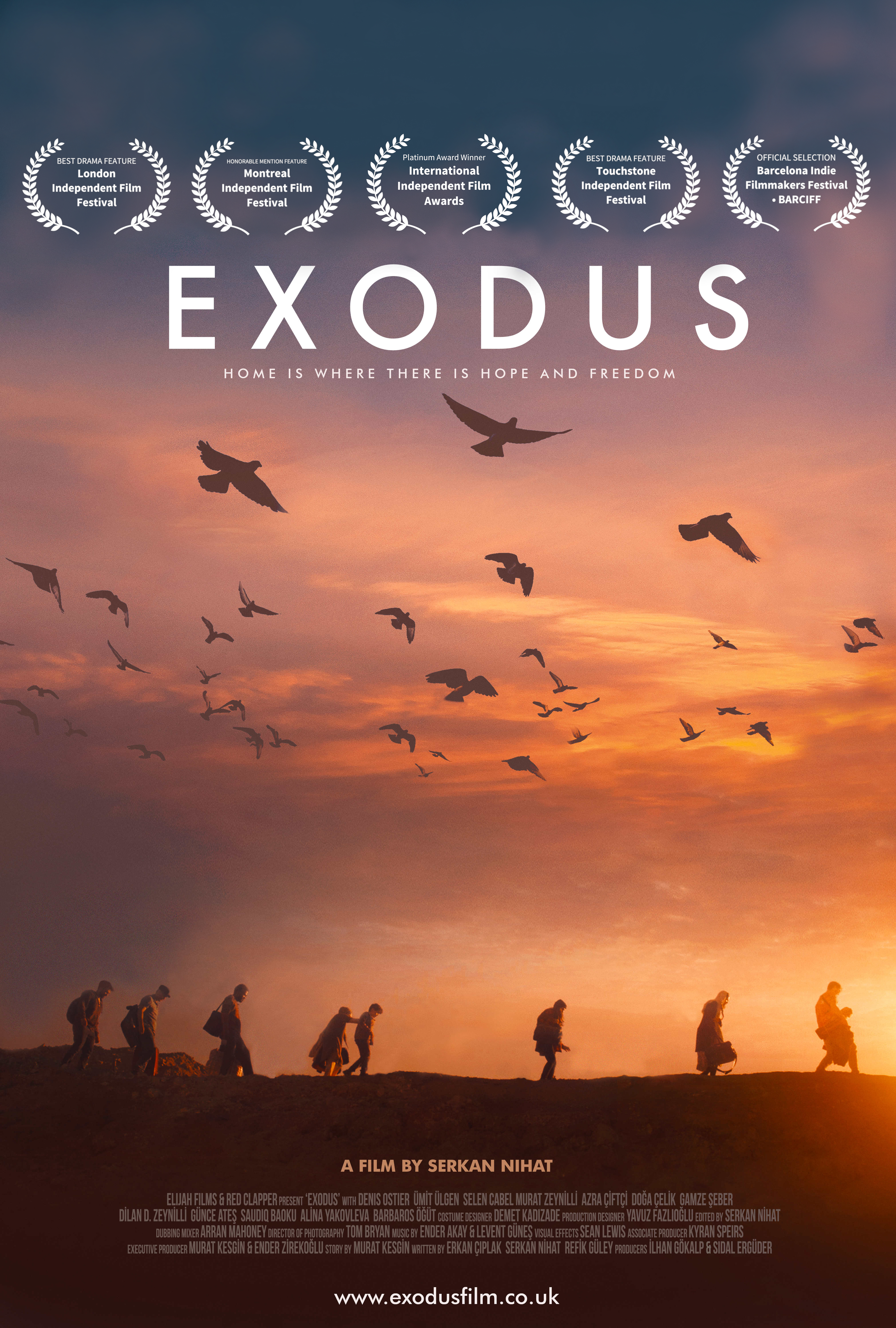
An official poster with prizes

Exodus received recognition at several international independent film festivals in 2024. At the London Independent Film Festival, it won the Best Drama Feature award, with director Serkan Nihat and executive producers Murat Kesgin and Ender Zirekoğlu acknowledged for their contributions.

At the Touchstone Independent Film Festival, Exodus was again awarded Best Drama Feature, with Nihat credited as director.

== Reception ==
=== Critical response ===
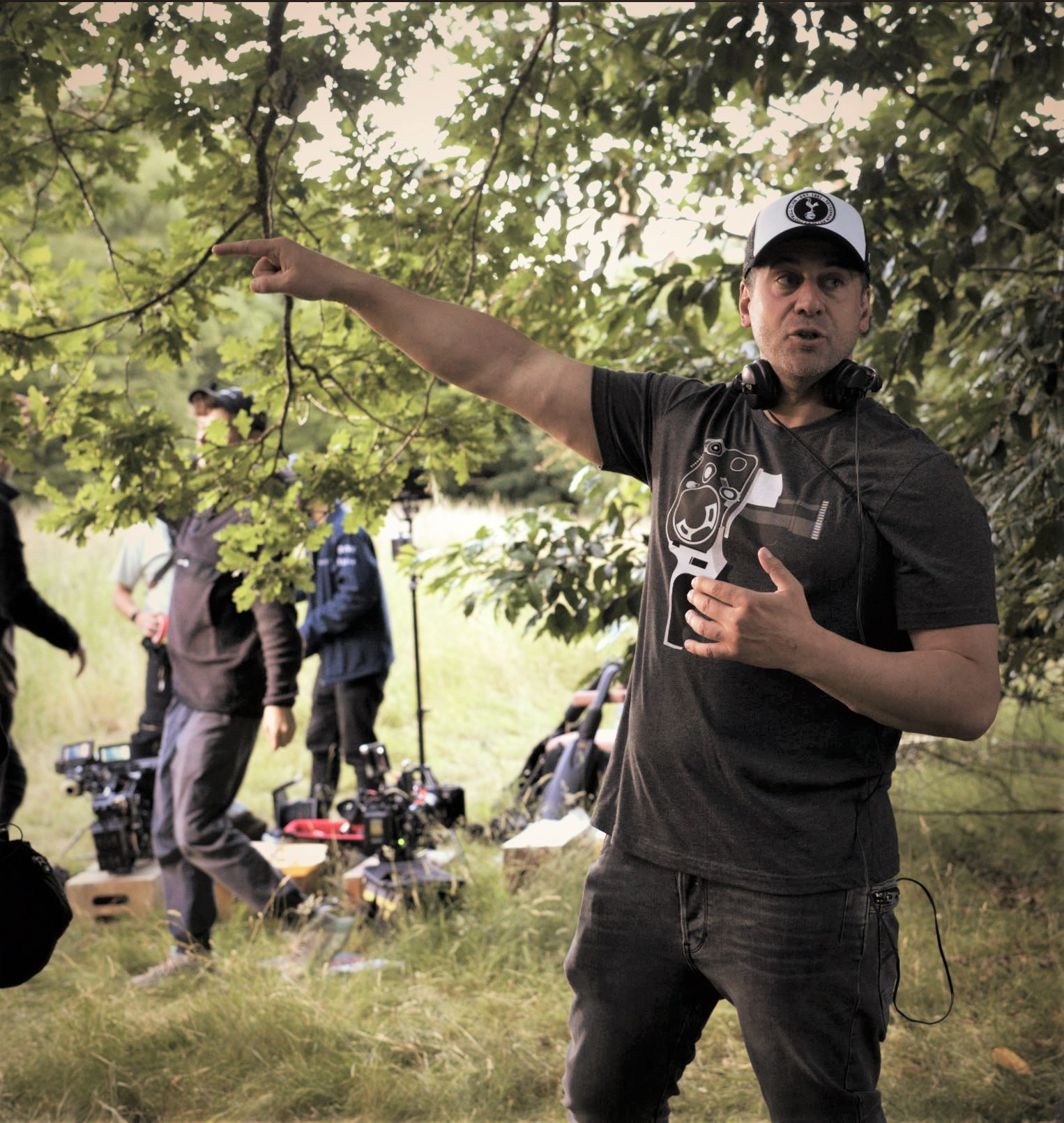
Serkan Nihat (The director of Exodus)

“If we look at the human timeline, democracy has only existed for a short period of time. For centuries we have been ruled by kings, queens, Tsars, Emperors and Sultans. Then slowly people started to rise up and many countries faced revolutions where the rulers were toppled, and replaced with democracy. However recently, people are beginning to not trust the system. People believe that their democracy has been hijacked by bureaucracy and self-interest and the needs of the majority clash with the self-interest of the minority. Every single one of us. You, your loved ones, and myself can all be perceived as enemies of the state. The person that was your friend, your ally is suddenly your enemy.” says Hakan Arıkan

The movie was described by film critic John Higgins as “another fine example of the cinematic possibilities presented if you have a strong idea combined with limited means.” He said the stories in the movie were “emotionally involving” and “heartbreaking at times.” Turkish Minute praised the storytelling as “emotionally involving” despite limited resources. It was released globally on digital platforms on 20 June 2025.

=== Censorship and controversy ===
In July 2025, Turkish authorities blocked all trailers of Exodus on YouTube in Türkiye following a governmental complaint, highlighting the film’s politically sensitive content.

Following the video ban, several social media platforms, including X (formerly Twitter), Facebook and Instagram, are said to have blocked or suspended official and promotional accounts related to the film. According to the organization EngelliWeb, the official website of the Association for Freedom of Expression, YouTube trailers and promotional accounts (including on X and Instagram) have also been blocked in Turkey based on an order of the Ankara 5th Criminal Court for Peace (Ankara 5. Sulh Ceza Hakimliği) (decision of July 4, 2025, file no. 2025/8111).

== Cast and characters ==
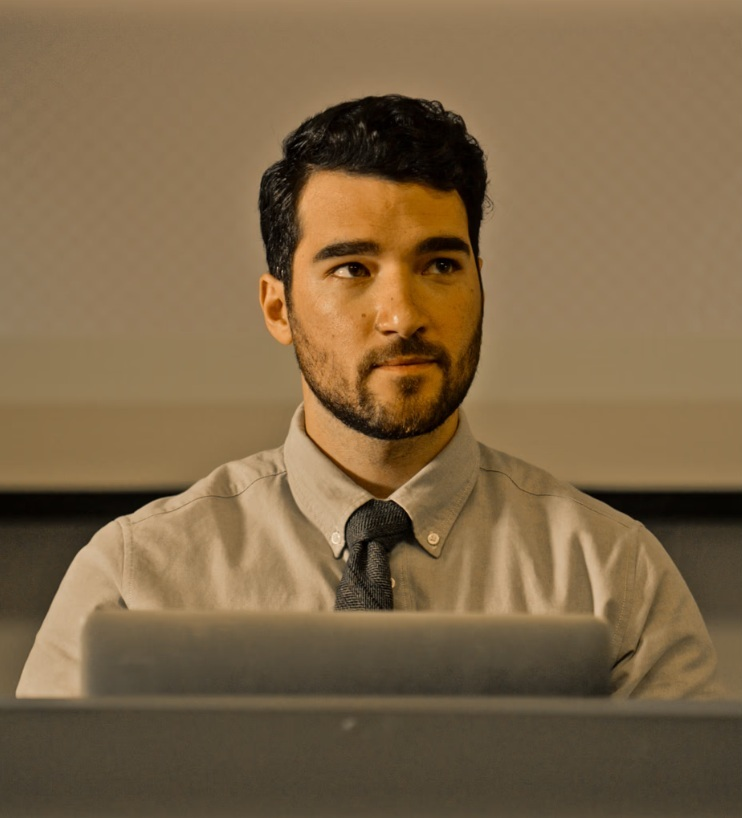
Denis Ostier played Hakan

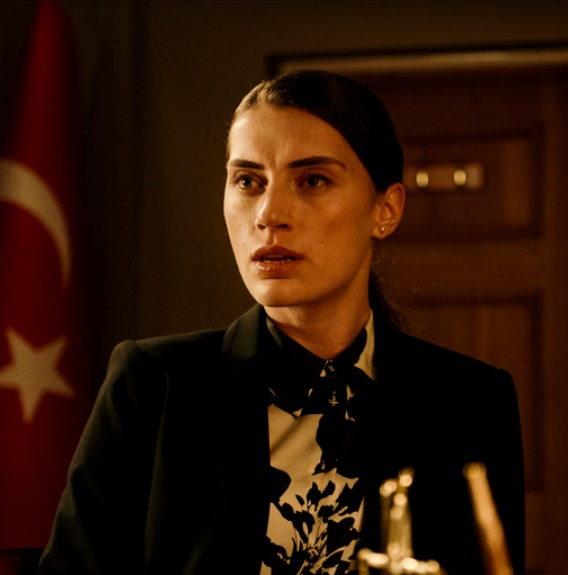
Dilan Derya Zeynilli played Nilüfer

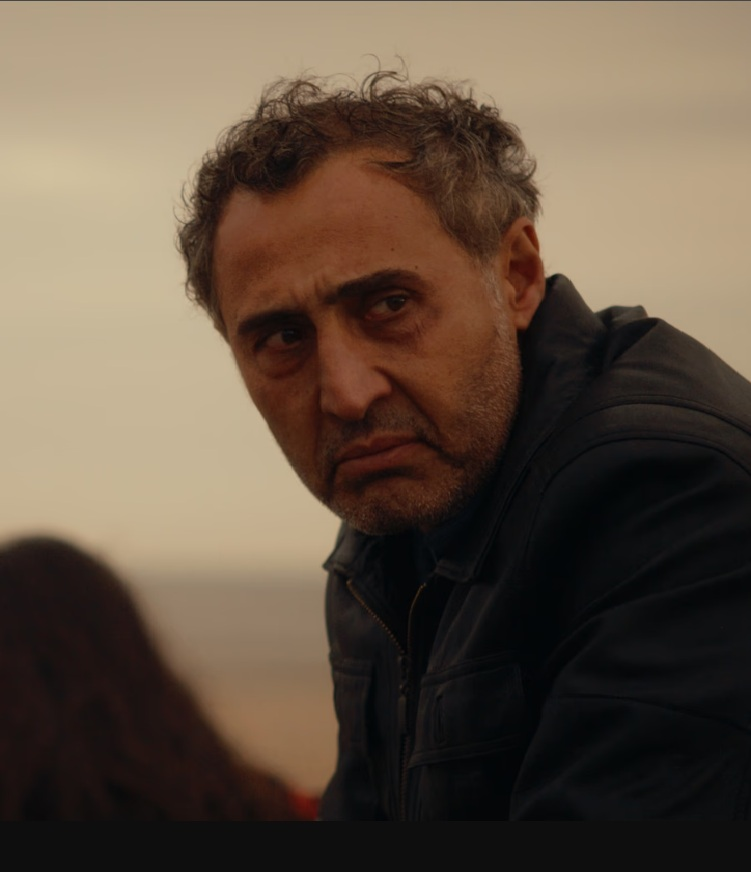
Ümit Ülgen played Mehmet

According to the film's official sources, the cast

- Denis Ostier — Hakan is an academic in the film, Ostier took on his first feature-length leading role in Exodus.
- Ümit Ülgen — Mehmet: Ülgen, who has starred in productions such as Doctor Strange and The Night Manager, plays police officer Mehmet in the film. A police character from Erzurum; a portrait struggling between conscience and duty.
- Dilan Derya Zeynilli — Nilüfer: An idealistic lawyer from a wealthy background.
- Doğa Çelik — Sahab: A character with a dark past involved in human trafficking.
- Selen Cabel — Zelal: An idealist of Kurdish origin with an artistic soul.
- Azra Çiftçi — Havin: A Yazidi woman; a victim of war and a figure searching for hope.
- Murat Zeynilli — Yılmaz: A 33-year-old intelligence officer; a nationalist figure with past ties to Hakan.
- Günce Ateş — Nermin: A mother whose husband is in France; finds the story within the framework of the concepts of migration and family.
- Gamze Özdemir — Esra: A math teacher; struggles with loneliness after her husband Mehmet leaves her.
- Saudiq Baoku — Kembo: A Congolese refugee character; The bond he establishes with Eren reflects the importance of humanity.
- Alina Yakovleva — Yaren: Mehmet and Esra's 11-year-old daughter; a symbol of a child affected by war.
- Barbaros Öğüt — Eren: Nermin's 10-year-old son; a child's perspective of the migration journey.

== Release ==
Exodus released for global release on 20 June 2025, across major digital platforms including Amazon Prime Video, Apple TV, YouTube TV, Google Play Movies & TV, and Vimeo.
