= Animal Planet (Polish TV channel) =

Polish television channel

- Country: Poland
- Broadcast area: Poland
- Headquarters: Media Business Centre; Warsaw, Poland

Programming
- Languages: Polish; English
- Picture format: 1080i (HDTV)

Ownership
- Owner: Warner Bros. Discovery EMEA
- Sister channels: Discovery Channel; Discovery Historia; Discovery Life; Discovery Science; DTX; Investigation Discovery; TLC

History
- Launched: October 1997; 28 years ago (SD); 9 September 2009; 16 years ago (HD)
- Closed: 31 January 2015; 11 years ago (SD)
- Replaced by: Discovery Life (SD version)

Links
- Website: www.animalplanet.pl

Animal Planet is a Polish television channel and was launched in Poland in October 1997. From the very beginning the U.S. network broadcast documentaries devoted to animals and wildlife. The broadcast of the channel was created specially for the needs of the Polish market.

In September 2003, the channel updated its logo and got a new slogan - "Wciągnie cię". The change was accompanied by a new schedule and an advertising campaign.

On 1 October 2008, the channel scrapped the old Animal Planet logo with an elephant and a globe and started using the new logo which had previously been introduced in the United States.

On 9 September 2009, a second channel based on this brand was launched: Animal Planet HD. The channel's layout was different from the Animal Planet's SD channel, although the channels broadcast similar programs.

In February 2012, Animal Planet became the producer of Animal Planet – Niepojęty świat zwierząt.

== Distribution ==
Animal Planet has been available in Poland at least since 1998 when Wizja TV launched. The channel grew significantly in 2002 when it reached several new distribution agreements.

In the fourth quarter of 2014, it was announced that Animal Planet in SD quality will be replaced by Discovery Life. The changes did not affect the HD distribution of Animal Planet.

=== Animal Planet HD ===
This channel was launched in Poland on 9 September 2009. It has a separate schedule in order for it to show only high-definition programmes. It was he ninth channel launched by Discovery in Poland. It was initially only available on the N platform, but launched on Cyfra+ on 16 September.
