= Dilan Derya Zeynilli =

Turkish actress

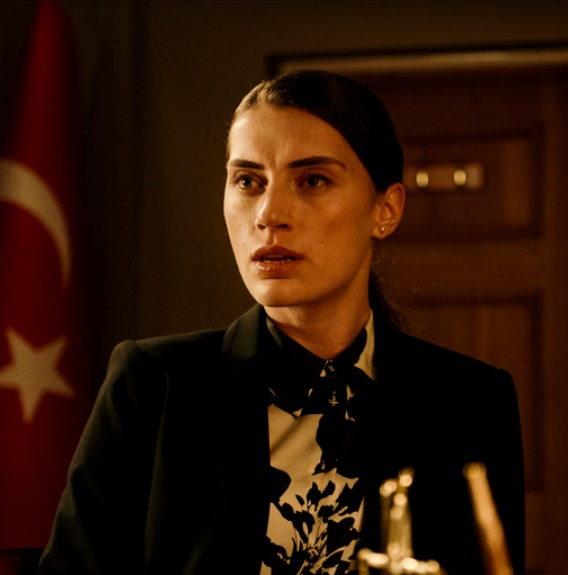
- Zeynilli in 2024
- Born: Istanbul, Turkey
- Education: Sadri Alışık Culture Centre; Haliç University
- Occupation: Actress
- Years active: 2010s–present
- Known for: Exodus (2025 film)
- Notable work: Kurtlar Vadisi Pusu, Aşkın Bedeli, Not Knowing
- Website: ddzartservices.co.uk

Dilan Derya Zeynilli (born July 1991) is a Turkish film, television and stage actress based in London, known for her performances in Turkish television productions and the internationally recognized film Exodus. Dilan Derya Zeynilli – known for Exodus (2025), Not Knowing (2019) and Fatih (2013).

== Early life and education ==
Zeynilli was born and raised in Istanbul, a global centre for theatre and the arts. From childhood, her family supported her artistic interests, enrolling her in acting classes that led to her acceptance at Sadri Alışık Culture Centre, where she trained for one year in acting. She passed conservatory entrance exams at all universities she applied to and chose Haliç University Conservatory, where she earned a Bachelor of Arts in Theatre Arts.

== Career ==
=== Television ===
During her university years, Zeynilli began receiving offers from major Turkish TV series such as Fatih and Kurtlar Vadisi Pusu, the latter of which aired in over thirty countries.

After graduating, she joined the cast of the daily drama series Aşkın Bedeli. Seeking broader cultural experience, she attended a language school program in Los Angeles, worked as a model for American brands, appeared in a music video by an American–Colombian group, and trained in the Chubbuck acting method.

=== Theatre ===
In early 2020, she performed in the children's theatre production Çinyo ile Markonyo, staged by Wise Akademi in Kadıköy. Çinyo ile Markonyo was a 2020 Turkish children's theater production by Wise Akademi Tiyatro, performed at Caddebostan Cultural Center in Istanbul. The allegorical puppet show explored parent-child relationships through the story of Çinyo (a rebellious puppet) and Markonyo (his overprotective puppeteer), with their dynamic transformed by a wise turtle named Kaplum. Starring Dilan Derya Aydın and Murat Zeynilli, the production used puppetry to examine themes of autonomy and growth.

=== Film and short films ===
In 2019, Zeynilli played Yeliz in the independent feature film Not Knowing, directed by Leyla Yılmaz.

Her breakthrough came with the British‑Turkish co‑production Exodus, directed by Serkan Nihat. Filmed in Istanbul, Cyprus and London, it premiered at the Berlin Film Festival in early 2024. The film addresses forced migration, human rights abuses, and political repression, with Zeynilli portraying lawyer Nîlüfer Bayraktar.

=== Awards ===
Exodus won Best Drama Feature at the 2024 London Independent Film Festival, highlighting the ensemble cast including Zeynilli.

== Selected filmography ==
Year	Title	Role	Notes
2013	Fatih	Supporting role	Minor appearance during university studies
2014–2015	Kurtlar Vadisi Pusu	Recurring role	Appeared in multiple episodes as part of the supporting cast.
2019	Not Knowing	Yeliz	Independent feature film by Leyla Yılmaz
2020	Çinyo ile Markonyo	Performer	Children's theatre production in Kadıköy
2025	Exodus	Nîlüfer Bayraktar	International political drama; premiered Berlin 2024; won London festival award
