= Wizja Jeden =

- Country: Poland
- Broadcast area: Poland
- Network: Wizja TV
- Headquarters: Warsaw, Poland

Programming
- Language: Polish
- Picture format: 576i (4:3 SDTV)

Ownership
- Sister channels: Twoja Wizja; Wizja Info; Wizja Le Cinema; Wizja Pogoda; Wizja Sport

History
- Launched: 1 April 1998; 27 years ago
- Closed: 31 March 2001; 24 years ago
- Former names: Wizja 1

Wizja Jeden was a Polish television channel that was launched on April 1, 1998. The channel was available on Wizja TV and some cable networks. The channel showed comedy related programs. The channel also commissioned dubbed versions of some programs such as South Park, Beavis and Butt-head, and others.

In addition to films, series and programs, the channel also broadcast events from concerts, sporting events and other events such as the Golden Globe Award.

The channel also carried sporting events since the beginning.

== Former programs ==
- Star Trek
- South Park
- Beavis and Butt-head
- Dilbert
- Daria
- Buffy the Vampire Slayer
- The PJs
- Captain Star
- Bob and Margaret
