= Polska Telewizja Kablowa =

Polish TV cable

- Founded: 1989
- Defunct: 2000
- Headquarters: Warsaw, Poland

Polska Telewizja Kablowa (PTK) was a cable television operating in Poland in 1989–2000.

== History ==
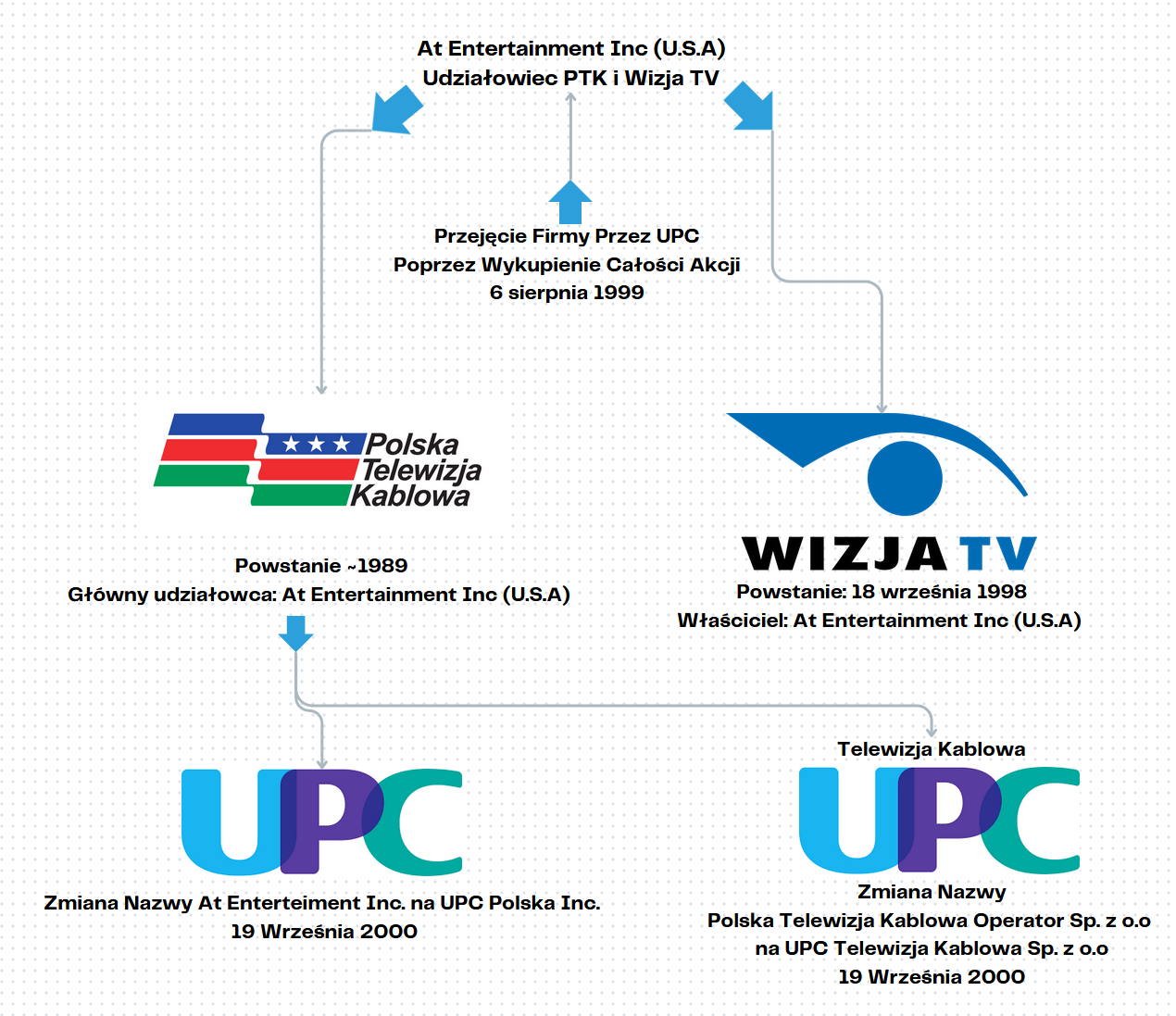
Polska Telewizja Kablowa Connections Diagram

The PTK offered services related to the construction and operation of cable television in eight of the largest urban agglomerations (including Warsaw, Kraków, Kielce, Tricity, Katowice, Lublin and Szczecin) and in many smaller towns. It was also the operator of the MMDS system used to distribute television channels and radio stations in the microwave band. This system operated in Warsaw, providing subscribers with 36 programs via a transmitter located on the roof of the Marriott Hotel. The PTK network covered approximately 1.7 million households, of which over 1 million used the company's services. PTK's broadband networks were among the most modern in Poland at that time.

In June 1999, the UPC took over all shares of At Entertainment, Inc., a company that was a shareholder of Wizja TV and PTK.

The Polska Telewizja Kablowa Operator Sp. z o.o. changed its name to UPC Telewizja Kablowa Sp. z o.o. (decision of the District Court for the Capital City of Warsaw of September 19, 2000).

== See also ==
- Television in Poland
