= Wizja Info =

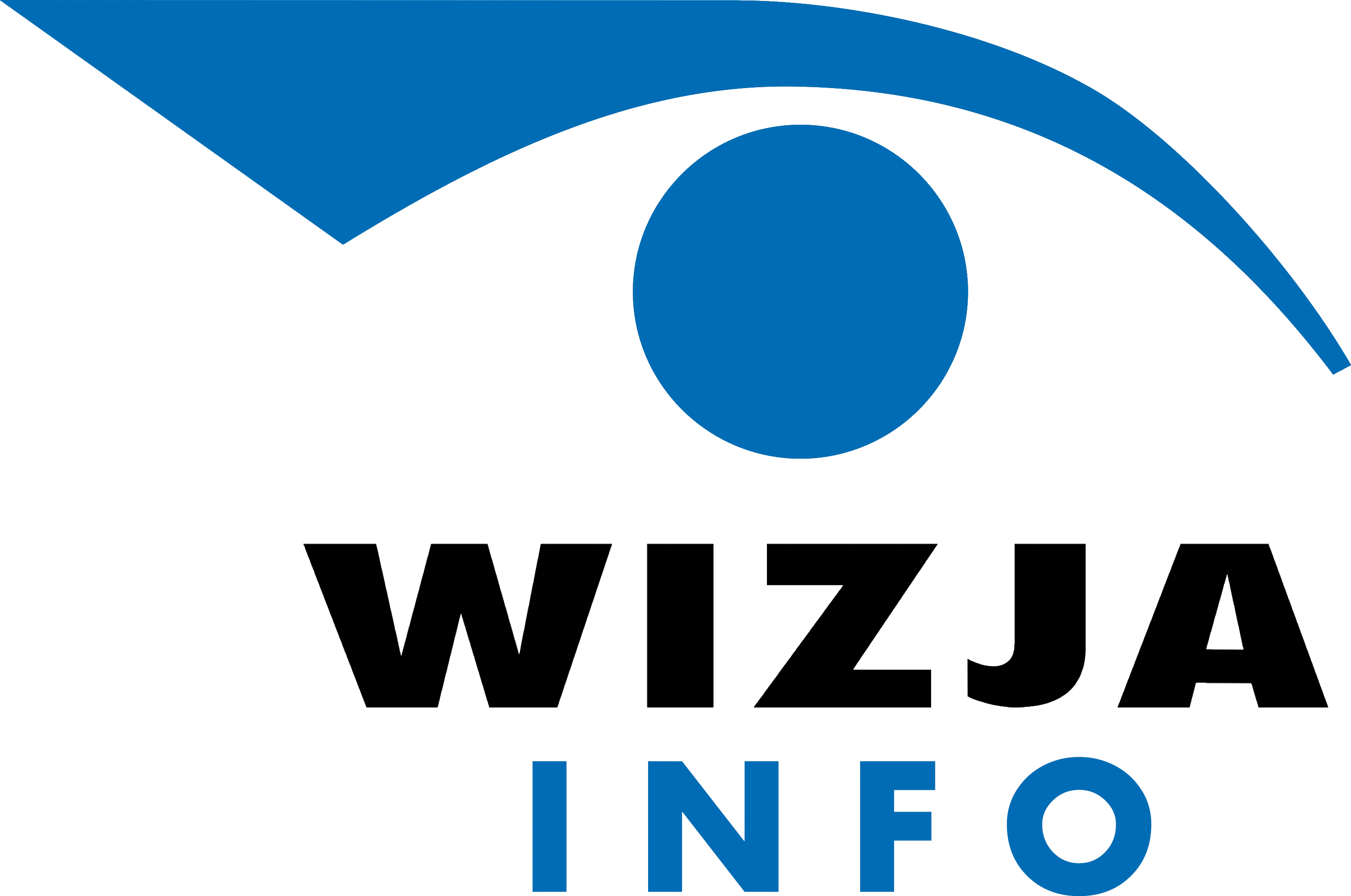
- Country: Poland
- Broadcast area: Poland
- Network: Wizja TV
- Headquarters: Warsaw, Poland

Programming
- Language: Polish
- Picture format: 576i (4:3 SDTV)

Ownership
- Sister channels: Twoja Wizja; Wizja Jeden; Wizja Le Cinema; Wizja Pogoda; Wizja Sport

History
- Launched: 25 July 2001; 24 years ago
- Closed: 15 March 2002; 24 years ago

Wizja Info was a Polish television station launched on July 25, 2001. The channel was available on the TV platform Wizja TV. The channel presented information about Wizja TV program's offer and information on subscriber contests, short overviews of the most interesting programming items and a list of the most important phone and contact details for customers.

Wizja Info ended broadcasting in 2002 after the merger of Wizja TV and Cyfra+.
