= Wizja Pogoda =

- Country: Poland
- Broadcast area: Poland
- Network: Wizja TV
- Headquarters: Warsaw, Poland

Programming
- Language: Polish
- Picture format: 576i (4:3 SDTV)

Ownership
- Sister channels: Twoja Wizja; Wizja Info; Wizja Jeden; Wizja Le Cinema; Wizja Sport

History
- Launched: 1 April 1998; 27 years ago
- Closed: 1 March 2002; 23 years ago

Wizja Pogoda was the first Polish TV weather channel. The channel started in 1998 and ceased in 2002.

== History ==
The channel was co-produced by Wizja TV and The Weather Department. Weather forecasts were prepared using advanced computer technology based on data from some 6,000 meteorological stations worldwide. Forecasts were updated twice a day. Data was complemented by satellite images which were sent by a special link to a transmission facility in Maidstone, which were later sent back to the Polish facilities. In early 1999, about 800,000 viewers had access to the channel, of which only 55,000 were regular viewers. The channel was liquidated in 2002 due to the merger of Wizja with Cyfra+

Initially, Wizja Pogoda was dividing the air time with National Geographic Channel and later with the Travel Channel. The program was broadcast from the morning until 1 pm (or until 2 pm when time-sharing with National Geographic Channel).

The station was available on the digital platform Wizja TV. The channel was one of the few that made the switch to Cyfra+ upon its merger, but in April 2002, broadcasts ceased.
