= Wizja Sport =

Polish television sports channel

- Country: Poland
- Broadcast area: Poland
- Network: Wizja TV
- Headquarters: Warsaw

Programming
- Language: Polish
- Picture format: 576i (4:3 SDTV)

Ownership
- Owner: @ Entertainment / UPC
- Sister channels: Wizja Jeden; Twoja Wizja; Wizja Info; Wizja Le Cinema; Wizja Pogoda

History
- Launched: 18 September 1999 at 7:00 PM
- Replaced: Twoja Wizja
- Closed: 31 December 2001 (2 years, 104 days)

Wizja Sport was the first Polish sports television station, initially broadcast as a daily programming block on the Twoja Wizja channel, available on the Wizja TV digital platform, and from 18 September 1999 as an independent sports channel, broadcasting from 12:00 to 24:00, and towards the end of its operation on weekends from 8:00 to 24:00.

== History ==
Initially, the programme was divided into several blocks: 12 p.m. - Na Bis (repeats), 2 p.m. - Magazyn, 3 p.m. - Sport o trzeciej, 5 p.m. - Magazyn, from 6 p.m. - Wydarzenie Dnia.

In its first year of operation, Wizja Sport broadcast over 750 hours of live coverage, including the Champions League, UEFA Cup, and all away matches of the Polish national team (including the qualifiers for the 2000 European Championship, and then the 2002 World Championship). The station also aired a lot of speedway, basketball (NBA), ice hockey, bowling, and billiards. It broadcast football matches from the Scottish, Dutch, and Portuguese leagues, the Football Conference, and the German Cup. The station competed with Canal+ for the rights to broadcast matches in the Polish Ekstraklasa. Since the beginning of 1999, it has broadcast Legia Warsaw league matches and the Polish Cup and Super Cup.

In 2000, the GfK Polonia institute conducted a study which showed that every third (30%) male Pole surveyed indicated Wizja Sport as the channel offering the richest sports offer, Eurosport received 51% of indications, DSF 12%, Polsat and Canal+ 9% each. Among Wizja TV satellite subscribers, Wizja Sport was indicated by 75% of recipients. 30% of respondents from a representative group of male Poles indicated Wizja Sport as the channel offering sports events unavailable on other channels, Eurosport received 45% of indications, Canal+ 19%, Polsat 16%, TVP2 15%. Among Wizja TV satellite subscribers, Wizja Sport was indicated by 76% of respondents.

== Journalists ==
The Wizja Sport journalists included Michał Bunio (one of the channel's creators), Tomasz Lorek, Bożydar Iwanow, Maciej Kurzajewski, Przemysław Babiarz, Edward Durda, Maciej Jabłoński, Paulina Smaszcz, Jarosław Krzoska. The station also collaborated with Jan Tomaszewski, Zenon Plech, Krzysztof Kosedowski, Jerzy Kulej, Krzysztof Hołowczyc and Anita Werner. Wizja Sport sponsored, among others, Tomasz Gollob, Krzysztof Hołowczyc, basketball players from Hoop Pruszków, boxers from Polish Boxing Promotion and the Polish hockey champion – Dwory Unia Oświęcim.

== Programs ==
The station produced its own programs, including "Piłkarska Wizja", "Motowizja", "Magazyn żużlowy", "Rajd z Hołkiem", "Kosz za kosz". From March 24, 2001, it was available free of charge to Wizja TV and UPC network subscribers. By the end of 2001, over 1,528 sports events had been broadcast, including:

- 608 broadcasts of football
- 225 broadcasts of basketball
- 110 broadcasts of speedway
- 450 broadcasts of ice hockey
- 65 broadcasts of handball
- 70 broadcasts of boxing

== Closure ==
The Wizja Sport ended its broadcast on December 31, 2001. The last program broadcast by the station was an hour-long benefis entitled Na pożegnanie (lit. 'Goodbye'), which summarized all broadcasts since the Wizja Sport channel was established, and also introduced the station's editorial staff and employees. After the program ended, a purple board appeared on the screen with the following inscription: Z dniem 1 stycznia Wizja Sport zaprzestała nadawania programu. Za wszystkie niedogodności przepraszamy i dziękujemy za wierne kibicowanie (transl. As of January 1st, Wizja Sport has ceased broadcasting. We apologize for any inconvenience and thank you for your loyal support). The next day the inscription on the board was changed to another one with the following content: Dnia 1 stycznia 2002 kanał Wizja Sport zakończył nadawanie. Już wkrótce nowy kanał (transl. On January 1, 2002, the Wizja Sport channel ceased broadcasting. A new channel is coming soon). In March 2002, Wizja TV was taken over by Cyfra+ and liquidated. At the beginning of 2002, Wizja Sport was replaced by the Canal+ Niebieski sports block until the merger of both digital platforms.
