= 18 Wheels Across America =

Polish-language travel documentary

- The titlecard of 18 Wheels Across America
- Genre: Travel documentary
- Created by: Maciej Dębowski
- Written by: Maciej Dębowski
- Directed by: Maciej Dębowski
- Presented by: Dawid Andres
- Countries of origin: United States; Poland
- Original language: Polish
- No. of series: 5
- No. of episodes: 46

Production
- Producer: Maciej Dębowski
- Cinematography: Maciej Domagalski
- Running time: 32 minutes (from seasons 1 to 2); 42 minutes (from seasons 3 to 5)
- Production company: Discovery Channel Poland

Original release
- Network: Discovery Channel Poland; TVN Turbo
- Release: 30 August 2017 – 31 May 2022

18 Wheels Across America (Polish: Ciężarówką przez Stany [t͡ɕɛw̃.ʐaˈruf.kɔw̃ pʂɛs‿ˈsta.nɘ̟], lit. 'with a lorry across the States') is a Polish-language travel documentary produced by Discovery Channel Poland and distributed by it together with TVN Group, with Dawid Andres as the host. It focuses on Andres's travels across the United States in his articulated lorry. He also occasionally visits Canada. The series aired on Discovery Channel Poland and TVN Turbo. It premiered on 30 August 2017. In total, the show has 5 seasons and 46 episodes. The last episode of the 5th season aired on 15 December 2022. The series also has nine spin-off miniseries.

== Premise ==
The series focuses on Dawid Andres, a driver and traveler from Poland, who, with his articulated lorry, transports cargo across the United States, while visiting various points of interest during his travels. He also occasionally visits Canada.

== Series overview ==
Series	Episodes	Originally released		
Series	Episodes	First released	Last released	Network
1	8	30 August 2017	20 October 2017	Discovery Channel Poland; TVN Turbo
2	10	21 February 2018	26 April 2018	Discovery Channel Poland; TVN Turbo
3	10	6 August 2018	10 October 2018	Discovery Channel Poland; TVN Turbo
4	9	21 August 2021	15 November 2021	Discovery Channel Poland; TVN Turbo
5	9	5 April 2022	31 May 2022	Discovery Channel Poland; TVN Turbo

== Production ==
18 Wheels Across America is a travel documentary hosted by Dawid Andres, a lorry driver and traveler originating from Poland, who lives in the United States. It is produced by Discovery Channel Poland, and distributed by it together with TVN Group. The series was created, directed, and produced by Maciej Dębowski, with Maciej Domagalski being its cinematographer. The series aired on Discovery Channel Poland and TVN Turbo, premiering on 30 August 2017. In total, the show has 5 seasons with 46 episodes. The airtime of an episode was 32 minutes for the first two seasons, and was increased to 42 minutes afterwards. The last episode aired on 31 May 2022.

Anders was proposed to host his own travel documentary after he received the Kolos award in the "best feat" category, at the All-Poland Traveler, Sailor and Mountaineer Meetings in Gdynia, Poland in 2016, for crossing South America on mountain bikes and home-made hydrocycles.

== Spin-offs ==
The series has nine spin-off miniseries, also focused around Anders' travels in a lorry. Each series ranges between 8 and 12 episodes. The first two series, aired in 2019, 18 Wheels Across Vietnam, and 18 Wheels Across Indonesia, depict Anders's travels across Vietnam and Indonesia, respectively. The third series, also aired in 2019, titled 18 Wheels Across Route 66, focuses on Anders's travel along the U.S. Route 66, a historic highway in the United States, running from Chicago, Illinois, to Santa Monica, California. The later series depict his travels across numerous different countries. They include: 18 Wheels Across Africa (2020) in Kenya and Uganda, 18 Wheels Across South Africa (2023) in South Africa, 18 Wheels Across Australia (2024) in Australia, 18 Wheels Across India (2025) in India, Ciężarówką przez Malezję (2025) in Malaysia and Singapore, and Ciężarówką przez Chile (2026) in Chile. Additionally, the next spin-off miniseries, Ciężarówką przez pół świata, is set to air in 2026, and will focus on the travel across numerous countries.

Spin-off miniseries overview
No.	Title	Episodes	Originally released			Ref.
No.	Title	Episodes	First released	Last released	Network	Ref.
1	18 Wheels Across Vietnam (Ciężarówką przez Wietnam)	9	19 February 2019	16 April 2019	Discovery Channel Poland; TVN Turbo	
Andres travels across Vietnam in an articulated lorry, from Hanoi, through Ho Chi Minh City, to the Mekong Delta region.
2	18 Wheels Across Indonesia (Ciężarówką przez Indonezję)	9	20 August 2019	15 October 2019	Discovery Channel Poland; TVN Turbo	
Andres travels in an articulated lorry in Indonesia.
3	18 Wheels Across Route 66 (Ciężarówką przez Route 66)	7	26 November 2019	25 December 2019	Discovery Channel Poland; TVN Turbo	
Andres travels in an articulated lorry from Chicago to Los Angeles on the U.S. Route 66.
4	18 Wheels Across Africa (Ciężarówką przez Afrykę)	9	25 February 2020	21 April 2020	Discovery Channel Poland; TVN Turbo	
Andres travels in an articulated lorry in Kenya and Uganda.
5	18 Wheels Across South Africa (Ciężarówką przez RPA)	8	30 March 2023	25 May 2023	Discovery Channel Poland; TVN Turbo	
Andres's travel in an articulated lorry across South Africa.
6	18 Wheels Across Australia (Ciężarówką przez Australię)	8	31 March 2024	26 May 2024	Discovery Channel Poland; TVN Turbo	
Andres travels in an articulated lorry across Australia.
7	18 Wheels Across India (Ciężarówką przez Indie)	12	27 March 2025	12 June 2025	Discovery Channel Poland; TVN Turbo	
Andres travels in an articulated lorry across India.
8	Ciężarówką przez Malezję	9	7 September 2025	2 November 2025	Discovery Channel Poland; TVN Turbo	
Andres travels in an articulated lorry in Malaysia. He also visits Singapore.
9	Ciężarówką przez Chile	8	5 April 2026	26 June 2026	Discovery Channel Poland; TVN Turbo	
Andres travels in an articulated lorry in Chile
10	Ciężarówką przez pół świata	TBA	2026 (upcoming)	2026 (upcoming)	Discovery Channel Poland; TVN Turbo	
Upcoming series. Andres travels 20,000 km (12,427.4 miles) in an articulated lorry across approximately half of the world.
