= Twoja Wizja =

- Country: Poland
- Broadcast area: Poland
- Network: Wizja TV
- Headquarters: Warsaw, Poland

Programming
- Language: Polish
- Picture format: 576i (4:3 SDTV)

Ownership
- Sister channels: Wizja Info; Wizja Jeden; Wizja Le Cinema; Wizja Pogoda; Wizja Sport

History
- Launched: 1 April 1998; 27 years ago
- Closed: 17 September 1999; 26 years ago

Twoja Wizja was a Polish television station launched on April 1, 1998. The channel was available on the TV platform Wizja TV. The channel presented the programming offer of all channels available on the Wizja TV platform and occasional sports events. These broadcasts aired a few hours a day and gained enough success to create a separate sports channel.

Twoja Wizja ended broadcasting on September 17, 1999. The same day, the channel was replaced by Wizja Sport.
