= Discovery Life (Polish TV channel) =

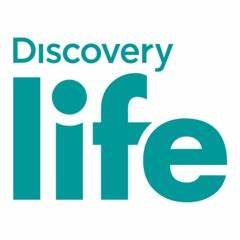
- Country: Poland
- Broadcast area: Poland
- Network: TVN
- Headquarters: Warsaw, Poland

Programming
- Language(s): Polish; English
- Picture format: 1080i (HDTV)

Ownership
- Owner: Warner Bros. Discovery EMEA
- Sister channels: Animal Planet; Discovery Channel; Discovery Science; Discovery Historia; Investigation Discovery; TLC; DTX

History
- Launched: 1 February 2015; 10 years ago (SD); 16 January 2017; 8 years ago (HD)
- Replaced: Animal Planet (SD)

Links
- Website: www.discoverylife.pl

Discovery Life is a Polish television channel owned by TVN, a division of Warner Bros. Discovery, which produces documentary, feature and entertainment films and series. In Poland, the channel replaced Animal Planet in SD quality on 1 February 2015. At the time of launch, the station was available in 55.5% of households in Poland. On 16 January 2017, Discovery Life began broadcasting in HD quality, replacing the previously released SD version.
