= Fearless Planet =

Fearless Planet is a program broadcast by The Discovery Channel. It was hosted by Will Gadd. The series was a six-episode documentary, airing weekly on Sundays from November 11 to December 16, 2007, at 10 p.m. ET/9 p.m. CT. The program was about the geology of the Earth and how some natural structures are created.

== Episodes and airdates ==
Episode #	Region	Airdate
1	Hawaii	Sunday, November 11, 10 p.m. ET/PT
2	Alaska	Sunday, November 18, 10 p.m. ET/PT
3	The Sahara Desert	Sunday, November 25, 10 p.m. ET/PT
4	Earth Story	Sunday, December 2, 10 p.m. ET/PT
5	The Great Barrier Reef	Sunday, December 9, 10 p.m. ET/PT
6	The Grand Canyon	Sunday, December 16, 10 p.m. ET/PT

== See also ==
- List of programs broadcast by The Discovery Channel
- Geology
