= Ragin' Cajuns (TV series) =

Television series

- Genre: Reality
- Country of origin: United States
- Original language: English
- No. of seasons: 1
- No. of episodes: 7

Production
- Running time: 22 minutes
- Production company: Gurney Productions

Original release
- Network: Discovery Channel
- Release: January 17 – February 28, 2012

Ragin' Cajuns is an American reality television series that aired on Discovery Channel. The series premiered on January 17, 2012, and ended on February 28, 2012.

== Episodes ==
No.	Title	Original release date	U.S. viewers (millions)
1	"White Gold"	January 17, 2012	N/A
2	"Shrimping, Storming, and Stabbing"	January 24, 2012	N/A
3	"Loyalty Versus Livelihood"	January 31, 2012	N/A
4	"Under Pressure"	February 7, 2012	N/A
5	"Engine Assault and Battery Acid"	February 14, 2012	N/A
6	"Man Overboard"	February 21, 2012	N/A
7	"One Last Shove"	February 28, 2012	N/A

== Cancellation ==
Discovery reported that only 680,000 viewers tuned in for the series premiere on January 17, leading to the show being quickly cancelled also pending a lawsuit from University of Louisiana for the copyright of the name "Ragin' Cajuns".
