= Swamp Brothers =

American reality television series

- Genre: Reality
- Country of origin: United States
- Original language: English
- No. of seasons: 1
- No. of episodes: 32

Production
- Running time: 42 minutes
- Production company: Story House Productions

Original release
- Network: Discovery Channel
- Release: May 10, 2011 – October 18, 2012

Swamp Brothers is an American reality television series. The series premiered on May 10, 2011, on Discovery Channel.

== Series overview ==
Season	Episodes	Originally released	
Season	Episodes	First released	Last released
1	32	May 10, 2011	October 18, 2012

== Episodes ==
No.	Title	Original release date	US viewers (millions)
1	"Partners in Slime"	May 10, 2011	N/A
2	"Sex and the Single Gator"	May 10, 2011	N/A
3	"That's the Big One"	May 13, 2011	N/A
4	"A Croc Walks Into a Swamp..."	May 13, 2011	N/A
5	"Everything's Bigger in Texas"	May 20, 2011	N/A
6	"Long Necks and Short Fuses"	May 20, 2011	N/A
7	"Straw That Broke the Camel's Back"	May 27, 2011	N/A
8	"Up a Swamp With One Paddle"	May 27, 2011	N/A
9	"No Crocodile Tears on This Farm"	May 30, 2011	N/A
10	"Grin and "Bear" It"	June 3, 2011	N/A
11	"Three-Legged Gator Race"	June 6, 2011	N/A
12	"Potbelly Pedicure"	June 10, 2011	N/A
13	"Man vs. Manatee"	June 19, 2011	N/A
14	"When Coco Met Lucy"	August 24, 2011	N/A
15	"Pimpin' Out the Croc"	August 24, 2011	N/A
16	"Thunder Claps and Gator Traps"	August 31, 2011	N/A
17	"Sex, Jaws and Gator Rolls"	August 31, 2011	N/A
18	"Crocs Gone Wild"	September 7, 2011	N/A
19	"Karma's a Bull"	September 7, 2011	N/A
20	"Branding and Expanding"	September 14, 2011	N/A
21	"Extreme Pond Makeover"	September 14, 2011	N/A
22	"Reptile Room Service"	September 21, 2011	N/A
23	"Model Misbehavior"	September 21, 2011	N/A
24	"Crouching Keszey, Hidden Gator"	September 28, 2011	N/A
25	"The Brotherhood of the Swamp"	September 28, 2011	N/A
26	"Once Bitten"	August 22, 2012	N/A
27	"Weekend Warriors"	August 29, 2012	N/A
28	"Special Delivery"	September 12, 2012	N/A
29	"The Good, The Bad and the Bloody"	September 19, 2012	N/A
30	"When It Rains, It Pours"	September 26, 2012	N/A
31	"If a Tree Falls in the Swamp..."	October 3, 2012	N/A
32	"For Love and Boar"	October 18, 2012	N/A
