= Lost Animals of the 20th Century =

- Narrated by: Greta Scacchi; Lin Sagovsky
- No. of episodes: 16

Original release
- Network: Discovery Channel

Lost Animals of the 20th Century is a 16-episode documentary series shown on the Discovery Channel in the 1990s. It features animals that have become extinct throughout the 20th century. Animals are adjudged as such when the last specimen of the species dies sometime from 1900 to 1999. However, since the show was produced in the 1990s (still part of the 20th century), most of the animals covered became extinct in the early part of the century. Greta Scacchi introduces each episode during the title sequence and narrates episodes 1 through 8. Lin Sagovsky narrates the remainder of the series.

== Format ==
Each show is 30 minutes long and discusses five to six extinct species bound by a common theme (e.g. animals that became extinct for being too charismatic; animals that became extinct due to natural disasters). For each animal, a detailed sketch is shown, including the year when the last specimen died. The general characteristics, territorial habitat and location are discussed. For each animal, the feature ends with how they became endangered, and eventually extinct, including how and when the last specimen died. Often, live materials such as old films are included. In cases where such is unavailable, the live materials feature existing species that share the closest characteristics with the extinct animal.

Although the show specifically deals with animals that have become extinct, there was one episode that featured the theme of animals which were thought to be extinct, but have been rediscovered. Such has also been the case of some previously featured animals in the show, as scientists have eventually rediscovered extant populations or are attempting to revive species through selective breeding/cloning.
