= East Harbour Heroes =

Reality television series

East Harbour Heroes is a reality/documentary television series that follows shipping and fishing operations in and around St. John's, Newfoundland and Labrador and its harbour. The series was commissioned by Bell Media's Discovery Channel Canada (now USA Network Canada) and premiered on May 29, 2023. The program has aired three seasons, with a spinoff, West Harbour Heroes, in production to air in 2026.

The first season aired on the American Discovery Channel from October 2025 to February 2026, as East Harbor Heroes (using American English spelling). After airing the first two episodes on Friday nights, Discovery U.S. moved the series to a weekend early morning timeslot for the remainder of its run, with a six-week gap between the penultimate and final episodes.
