= Firehouse USA: Boston =

Television series

- Genre: Reality; Documentary
- Created by: Mark Kadin, Tucia Lyman
- Opening theme: Unnamed by Matt Koskenmaki
- Country of origin: United States
- Original language: English
- No. of seasons: 1
- No. of episodes: 11

Production
- Running time: 42–43 minutes

Original release
- Network: Discovery Channel
- Release: September 20 – November 25, 2005

Related
- Emergency! Third Watch

Firehouse USA: Boston was a 2005 TV series on Discovery Channel. The series followed Boston Fire Department Engine Company 37 and Ladder Company 26, quartered on Huntington Ave., Boston, Massachusetts. The narrator was Mikey Kelley and the executive producer was Mark Kadin. The series premiered on September 20, 2005 and was canceled later that year. A likely reason Huntington Ave was chosen was due to it being regarded as one of the busiest firehouses in Boston.

== Post-series ==
One of the firefighters who appeared in the series, Lt. Kevin Kelly, was killed in a crash when Ladder 26 was returning from a call. The ladder truck became a runaway due to brake failure on a hill, the truck hit two parked cars then a building killing Lt. Kelly & injured 3 other fire fighters. (Also see: BFD Apparatus)

== See also ==
- Boston Fire Department, where the series was filmed
- Emergency!, a 1970s drama about two paramedics and their firehouse
- Rescue 911, a 1990s true series of saving lives
- Third Watch, a 2000s drama about the FDNY and NYPD
- Rescue Me, a 2000s drama about the FDNY
