= How We Invented The World =

2012 Discovery Network TV documentary

- Genre: Documentary
- No. of seasons: 1
- No. of episodes: 5

Production
- Running time: 42 minutes
- Production company: Nutopia

Original release
- Network: Discovery Channel
- Release: November 6 – December 4, 2012

How We Invented The World is a 2012 documentary miniseries that aired on Discovery Channel and was produced by Nutopia. It was directed by Stephen Warburton, Jonathan Rudd and Sam Miller. It Explores the most iconic inventions and breakthroughs of the modern age. It was narrated by Laurence Fox.

== Episodes ==
No.	Title	Original release date
1	"Mobile Phones"	November 6, 2012
The mobile phone has connected the modern world, but inventing it took the most beautiful woman in the world, Frankenstein’s creator, the Titanic tragedy and the ultimate stroll down 6th Avenue.
2	"Skyscrapers"	November 13, 2012
The skyscraper – the ultimate symbol of power and wealth. But, incredibly, to invent the skyscraper it took a bird in a cage, a city in flames, a chance question from a college student and the humble horse and wagon.
3	"Aeroplanes"	November 20, 2012
The aeroplane - it’s made our dream of flight a reality, but the moments of genius and invention it took to invent it involved not just birds as inspiration, but bikes, a trip to the Moon and back, a pair of frozen eyeballs and two nervous breakdowns.
4	"Cars"	November 27, 2012
The car - so much more than getting us from A-B, but the eureka moments it took to invent the car we know today included a Scottish veterinarian, an ambitious wife, thousands of slaughtered animals and a terrifying experiment with boiling oil.
5	"Guns"	December 4, 2012
