= Perfect Disaster =

Discovery Channel mini-series

- Genre: Documentary
- Narrated by: Michael Carroll
- Composer: Ty Unwin
- Countries of origin: United Kingdom; United States
- Original language: English
- No. of seasons: 1
- No. of episodes: 6

Production
- Executive producers: Jasper James; Tim Haines
- Producers: Clive Maltby; Mike Slee
- Running time: 50 minutes
- Production company: Impossible Pictures

Original release
- Network: Discovery Channel; Science Channel (rerun)
- Release: March 19 – April 9, 2006

Perfect Disaster is a one-hour American documentary television mini-series that ran from March 19 until April 9, 2006 on the Discovery Channel. The program depicted the worst-case scenario that major cities could expect in the near future if hit by extreme disaster. A large part of each episode was recounted the lives of citizens from each city, with the remainder of the program showing many real-world scientists discussing the very high probabilities of these disasters. The trademark tagline of the show was "When the conditions are right, it will all go wrong."

The series currently airs as reruns on the Science Channel.

== Episodes ==
- Dallas: Destroyed by what is declared a super-tornado, one exceeding an F5 on the Fujita scale. The presentation also describes the fact that the probability of this catastrophe is the highest of all the proposed scenarios.
- New York City: Being subject to a powerful geomagnetic storm in the year 2011, causing widespread damage to electronics, and several bizarre extraterrestrial anomalies. 6 years after the mini-series premiere, a solar storm roughly half as powerful than the one depicted, erupted from the sun and misses the Earth by a margin of 9 days.
- Sydney: Engulfed in the flames of a large firestorm that is brewing out of control during the dry summer weather. Similar to some phenomena seen in the Black Saturday bushfires, which occurred less than 3 years after this show's premiere. The scenario also describes that 90% of all investigated fires are caused by man-made activity, particularly by arsonists.
- Hong Kong: The victim of a super typhoon from the West Pacific. Following the miniseries, Super Typhoon Mangkhut struck Hong Kong in 2018 but had already weakened into Category-1 status and no fatalities were reported; in 2025, another super typhoon, Ragasa took nearly the same path as typhoon 'Vipha' but didn't make a direct landfall in Hong Kong.
- London: Deluged by a massive flood that breaks past the city's levees.
- Montreal: Stricken by a severe ice storm, in a manner similar to the North American ice storm of 1998.

Though seemingly unrealistic, each disaster was represented as terrifyingly large and powerful, in order to show the worst possible scenario in the case of each city. The series was produced by Impossible Pictures, the same group that made the 1999 BBC mini-series Walking with Dinosaurs, which was screened in the United States on the Discovery Channel. Footages of real-life disasters were used on certain episodes for illustrative purposes.

The computer graphics were completed by Gareth Edwards (Super Tornado and Solar Storm), Lola (Firestorm and Ice Storm), and Red Vision (Flood and Typhoon).

== See also ==
- Mega Disasters, a very similar but longer-running television series on The History Channel.
- It Could Happen Tomorrow, another worst-case scenario series on The Weather Channel.
