= Construction Intervention =

- Starring: Charlie Frattini
- Country of origin: United States
- No. of seasons: 1
- No. of episodes: 11

Production
- Running time: 40–44 minutes
- Production company: Discovery Communications

Original release
- Network: Discovery Channel
- Release: April 13 – September 2, 2010

Construction Intervention is a program on the Discovery Channel in which host Charlie Frattini and his team save small business that are on the brink of closing due to bad contractors or botched construction. They then get to work, completing all aspects of construction in a mere four days, and give the owner back a brand new business, ready for the masses.

== Episodes ==
No.	Title	Original release date
1	"Blarney Stone"	April 13, 2010
2	"Just Wingin'it"	April 20, 2010
3	"Al Di La"	April 30, 2010
4	"Botta Di Vino"	May 7, 2010
5	"Locale"	May 14, 2010
6	"Real Deal Barbershop"	May 21, 2010
7	"Stars Youth Center"	May 28, 2010
8	"Inwood Boxing Academy"	June 4, 2010
9	"Brooklyn Farmacy"	September 2, 2010
10	"Guys and Dolls Billiards"	September 2, 2010
11	"Charlie's Back"	September 2, 2010
