= Serkan Nihat =

Turkish–British film director and producer

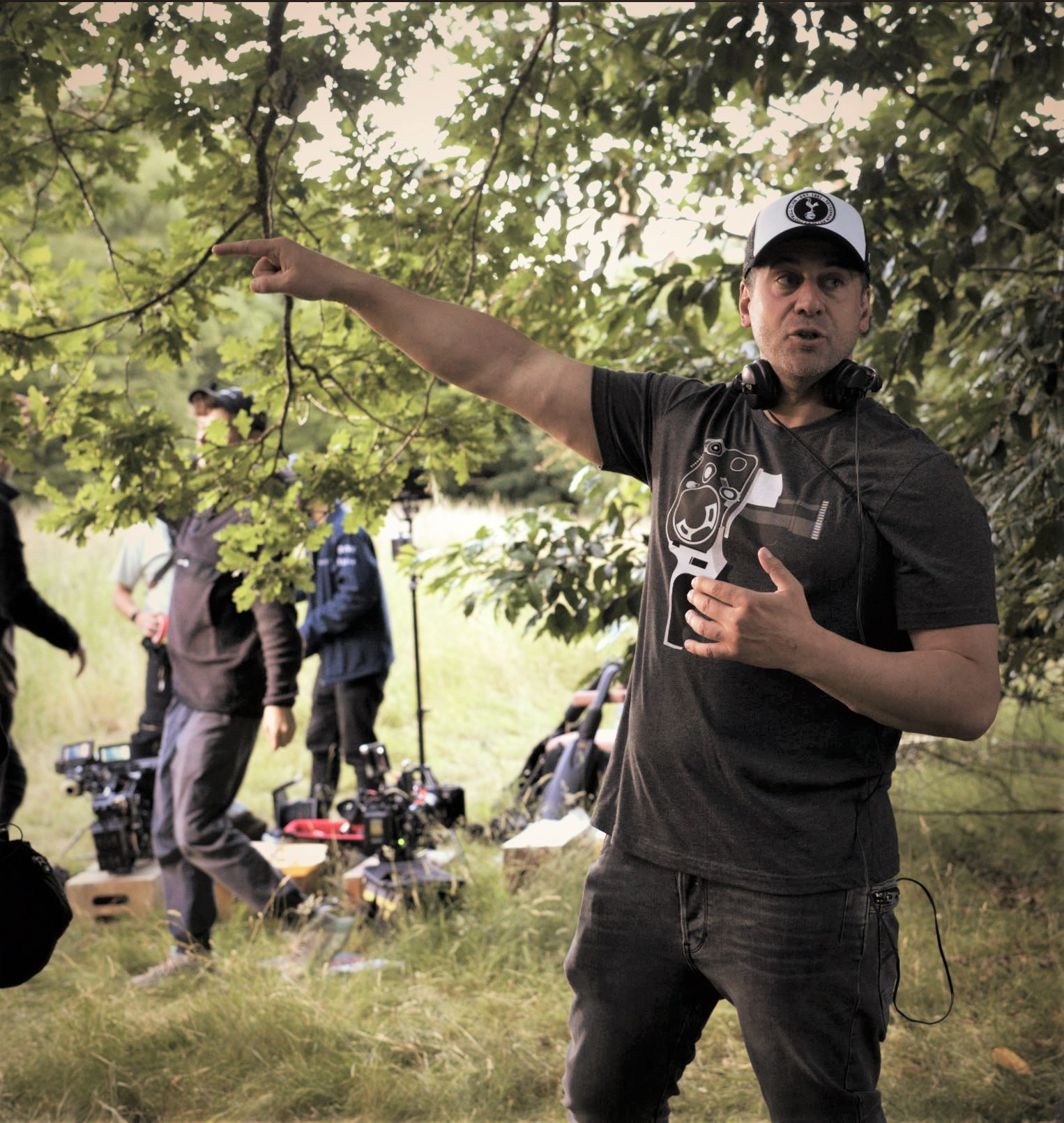
- Nihat at a film set in 2023
- Born: Edmonton, London, England
- Occupation: Film director · Screenwriter · Producer · Editor
- Years active: 2005–present
- Website: www.serkannihat.com

Serkan Nihat is a Turkish–British filmmaker based in London. He began as an assistant editor on UK television dramas, transitioned into directing commercials and branded content, and later made his feature directorial debut with the political drama Exodus, which premiered at the Berlin International Film Festival and won multiple awards.

== Career ==
Nihat worked as an assistant editor on UK television productions, including Spooks, Broadchurch, Taboo, and Law & Order, where he specialized in digital post-production workflows.

=== Advertising ===
In the 2010s, he directed commercials for brands like Barclays, Unilever, and John Lewis. In 2018, he won a Silver Dolphin at the Cannes Corporate Media & TV Awards for a Barclays campaign.

=== Exodus (2025) ===
Nihat's debut feature, Exodus, premiered in the European Film Market at the 2024 Berlin International Film Festival. It then opened the London Independent Film Festival (LIFF) on 19 April 2024 and won Best Drama Feature.

Exodus also received Best Drama Feature at the Touchstone Independent Film Festival and the Special Jury Prize at the Montreal Independent Film Festival.

Nihat co-wrote Exodus with Erkan Çıplak and Refik Güley, collaborating with cinematographer Tom Bryan.

== Themes and reception ==
Nihat's work frequently addresses themes of political realism, migration, and identity. In an interview with T‑Vine, he described Exodus as aiming to “give a human face to the migration issue.”

Phil Hoad of The Guardian praised the film's ambition but noted that its characters felt emblematic rather than fully developed.

== Awards ==
Year	Festival	Category	Work	Result
2024	London Independent FF	Best Drama Feature	Exodus	Won
2024	Touchstone Independent FF	Best Drama Feature	Exodus	Won
2024	Montreal Independent FF	Special Jury Prize	Exodus	Won
2018	Cannes Corporate Media & TV Awards	Silver Dolphin	Armed Forces Campaign	Won
