= Ocean Odyssey (TV series) =

Television programme

Ocean Odyssey (working title Oceans) is a two-part, two-hour (the two parts last an hour long) television programme produced for the BBC by the production company Impossible Pictures.

It follows the life of a bull sperm whale from his birth until his death, stranded on a beach (originally it was to be a voyage in a submarine).

Unlike most Impossible Pictures productions, it uses CGI to recreate extant creatures rather than extinct creatures. Most of the backgrounds are also CG.
