= Resurrection Tomb Mystery =

The Resurrection Tomb Mystery
- Directed by: Simcha Jacobovici
- Produced by: Simcha Jacobovici; Felix Golubev; Ric Esther Bienstock
- Starring: Simcha Jacobovici
- Distributed by: Koch Vision, Discovery Channel, and Vision TV
- Release date: April 12, 2012
- Countries: US; Canada
- Language: English

The Resurrection Tomb Mystery is a television documentary program produced and first broadcast on the Discovery Channel and Vision TV in Canada on Thursday, April 12 at 10pm e/p during Easter week 2012. The documentary was executive produced by Simcha Jacobovici, Ric Esther Bienstock and Felix Golubev of Associated Producers, Ltd.

The documentary was preceded by a companion book authored by James Tabor, Professor and Chair of the Department of Religious Studies at the University of North Carolina, Charlotte, and Jacobovici entitled, The Jesus Discovery. The documentary and book claimed to have revealed the earliest evidence of resurrection of Jesus ever discovered.

== See also ==
- The Lost Tomb of Jesus
