= Wizja TV =

Polish satellite TV platform

- Founded: 18 September 1998
- Defunct: 1 March 2002
- Headquarters: Warsaw, Poland
- Products: Direct broadcast satellite, television programs

Wizja TV was the first Polish television and radio satellite digital platform, which started broadcasting on September 18, 1998.

== History ==
Test broadcasts of the Wizja TV television programme from a studio in Maidstone, near London, began in September 1997, 2 months after registration of the trademark for Wizja in the Patent Office of the Republic of Poland. During the first test broadcasts of the channels, the final name for the platform Wizja TV and its trademarks were also registered, as well as the early names of the platforms' channels, i.e. Wizja One, Wizja Movies, Wizja Sports and Wizja Kids. In January 1998, the Wizja 1 trademark was registered, as well as 3 additional variants: Wizja 1 Filmy, Wizja 1 WOW and Wizja 1 Sport.

On April 1, 1998, the first station of this platform (Wizja Jeden) officially began broadcasting. On April 2, 1998, the Broadcasting Center in Maidstone was already fully ready to launch the first digital satellite television in Poland, and a few days later, the Wizja TV Customer Service Telephone Center was opened in Katowice. The platform was to be launched on April 18, 1998, but as a result of the signing of a letter of intent by Canal+ Polska regarding the delay of the Wizja TV launch, its launch was delayed by half a year. Despite this, in June 1998, 12 foreign thematic channels in Polish of Wizja TV were introduced to the basic package of Polska Telewizja Kablowa (600 thousand subscribers). On July 1, 1998, the distribution of individual receiving sets (decoders) for people registered on the reservation list began. The actual and official launch of the project took place on September 18, 1998, and Wizja TV offered 18 thematic channels, including 16 in Polish. The founder was the United States company At Entertainment Inc., soon afterwards taken over by the cable television operator UPC. Philips also participated in the Wizja TV project, which provided individual reception sets, creating a distribution network based on authorized points of sale and Astra (satellite operator). From July to early October 1998, about 35,000 decoder units were sold.

On March 1, 2002, Wizja TV merged with the competing platform Cyfra+, as a result of which Nowa Cyfra+ was created. Wizja TV was broadcast from the Astra 19.2°E satellite, encoded in the Cryptoworks system.

The digital package of Wizja TV programmes was addressed to both individual recipients (DTH) and cable network subscribers. The programmes received a licence from the Independent Television Commission (the English licensing authority for commercial television), thanks to which they benefited from the protection of the European Convention on Transfrontier Television. Wizja TV was broadcast using the latest digital technology at the time, called DVB MPEG-2. It used a satellite feeder station in Maidstone and was retransmitted from position 19.2 E (Astra), from where it reached subscribers of the PTK cable network and individual recipients. Wizja TV was the first case in Europe where the digital platform for a given country was created entirely by a foreign entity and broadcast programmes from outside the borders of the country for which they were intended.

== Program offer ==
- Own channels: Twoja Wizja, Wizja Jeden (later, a separate channel was created from the Wizja Jeden sports band, Wizja Sport, which replaced Twoja Wizja), Wizja Pogoda,
- Movies: Hallmark Channel, HBO, Romantica, TCM (shared airtime with Cartoon Network),
- Kids: Fox Kids (shared airtime with Bet on Jazz), Cartoon Network (shared airtime with Turner Classic Movies, aka TCM),
- Documentary and Educational: National Geographic Channel, QuesTV, Travel Channel (shared airtime with Wizja Pogoda), Discovery Channel, Animal Planet,
- Sports: Eurosport (added shortly after launch),
- Music: Atomic TV, Bet on Jazz International, MTV Europe,
- News program: CNN International.

All programs, except CNN International, Bet on Jazz and MTV, were presented in Polish, although not immediately throughout the broadcast. Individual recipients who purchased digital sets to receive Wizja TV also had access to over 40 other uncoded television programs and 30 radio stations, broadcast via the Astra satellite. Reception took place via Philips DSB3010 terminals, and later Philips DSX6010, equipped with the Cryptoworks access control system.

Initially, Wizja TV's offer was also to include channels such as Knowledge TV (popular science) or Shopping TV (teleshopping), as well as Sci-Fi Channel (film), however, due to the delay in the launch of the platform, these channels did not ultimately appear in the offer.

Later, Wizja TV's offer also included Polish television stations: TVN, Nasza TV (later TV4), Polsat, Polsat 2, RTL 7, TVP1, TVP2, Super 1, Polonia 1, TV Niepokalanów (later TV Puls) and new thematic channels:

- film programme: Wizja Le Cinema,
- lifestyle programmes: Club, Avante, E!,
- documentary programme: Reality TV,
- sports programmes: Wizja Sport (was separated from the Wizja Jeden band), Eurosport News, Extreme Sports Channel,
- music programmes: VH1 (replaced MTV Europe), MTV 2, MTV Base, VH1 Classic, MTV Polska (replaced Atomic TV),
- news programmes: TVN24,
- programme for subscribers: Wizja Info,
- erotic programme: Private Gold (additionally paid).

The Wizja TV platform offer was aimed at individual recipients who would purchase a satellite reception set and cable network subscribers (Wizja TV programs were available in Poland's largest cable television network, UPC Cable Television). Cable television network subscribers did not need additional equipment to receive programs from the Wizja TV package (apart from HBO, an additionally paid channel). It was enough to be a subscriber to the full package of programs offered in UPC Cable Television networks. For a short period, Wizja TV also offered satellite Internet access, the so-called Chello satellite. The return channel in this case was an ordinary telephone modem.

== See also ==
- Television in Poland
