= How Beer Saved the World =

- Genre: Documentary
- Created by: Alan Eyres
- Written by: Martyn Ives
- Starring: Henry Strozier; George Armelagos; Charlie Bamforth
- Country of origin: United States
- Original language: English

Production
- Editors: Gillian Abraham; Warren Saunders; Lukasz Termer
- Running time: 60 minutes

Original release
- Network: Discovery Channel
- Release: January 30, 2011

How Beer Saved the World is an hour-long documentary that was broadcast on the Discovery Channel on January 30, 2011. Produced by Australian production company Beyond Productions, the documentary takes a look at the origins of beer and how it has had an influence on major events in human history such as the building of the pyramids in Egypt and the creation of modern medicine.

== Production history ==
Discovery Channel Executive Producer Alan Eyres initially broached the idea of focusing on the history of beer during a pitch meeting in April 2009. He did not officially approve the project until May of the following year, after he had brought on John Luscombe's production company Beyond to produce the documentary. Filming began in November 2010 at Oregon State University, in Corvallis, Oregon and finished up in early January 2011.

== Reception ==
Reason gave a short, favorable review for the film, writing that it "makes an entertaining case that fermented malt beverages are "the greatest invention of all time."
