= Walking with... =

Television series

- Cover of the Australian 2008 DVD box set of the franchise
- Created by: Tim Haines & Jasper James (Note: Tim Haines conceptualized both Walking with Dinosaurs and Walking with Beasts and is often referred to as the creator of the series. Jasper James joined as producer during the development of Walking with Dinosaurs and served as co-creator and creator for later programmes; together they founded Impossible Pictures, which produced all series and specials except for Walking with Cavemen. Additional creators behind the different series include Susan Spindler (co-creator of Walking with Dinosaurs), Andrew Wilks (co-creator of Walking with Beasts and Walking with Monsters), Richard Dale and Peter Georgi (creators of Walking with Cavemen) and Chloe Leland (co-creator of Walking with Monsters).)
- Original work: Walking with Dinosaurs
- Owner: BBC

Print publications
- Book: See below

Films and television
- Film: Walking with Dinosaurs (film) (2013)
- Television series: Walking with Dinosaurs (1999); Walking with Beasts (2001); Walking with Cavemen (2003); Sea Monsters (2003); Walking with Monsters (2005); Walking with Dinosaurs (2025)
- Television specials: The Ballad of Big Al (2000); The Giant Claw (2002); Land of Giants (2003)

Theatrical presentations
- Play: Walking with Dinosaurs − The Arena Spectacular (2007-2019)

Games
- Video game: See below

Walking with... (Note: Walking with... is the conventional umbrella title for the franchise. Other names sometimes used include Walking with Prehistoric Life and Prehistoric Earth. Walking with Dinosaurs (1999), Beasts (2001) and Monsters (2005) have also been marketed together as the Trilogy of Life.) is a palaeontology media franchise produced and broadcast by the BBC Studios Science Unit. The franchise began with the series Walking with Dinosaurs (1999), created by Tim Haines. By far the most watched science programme in British television during the 20th century, Walking with Dinosaurs (1999) spawned companion material and five sequel series: Walking with Beasts (2001), Walking with Cavemen (2003), Sea Monsters (2003), Walking with Monsters (2005), and Walking with Dinosaurs (2025). Series in the franchise typically use a combination of computer-generated imagery and animatronics, incorporated with live action footage shot at various locations, to portray prehistoric animals in the style of a traditional nature documentary.

The Walking with... programmes were praised for their special effects and for their science communication. Though largely praised by scientists for the effort to adhere to science and for portraying prehistoric life as animals rather than movie monsters, some academic criticism has been leveled at the series for not making clear through their narration what is speculative and what is based in fact.

In addition to the five main series, the success of Walking with... also led to the production of the Walking with Dinosaurs special episodes The Ballad of Big Al, The Giant Claw and Land of Giants. The franchise has also been accompanied by several books, merchandise, video games and the live theatrical show Walking with Dinosaurs − The Arena Spectacular. In 2013, a movie based on Walking with Dinosaurs, with the same name, was directed by Neil Nightingale and Barry Cook. In 2025, a new Walking with Dinosaurs series was produced by BBC and PBS, with Kirsty Wilson as the showrunner.

== Development ==
=== Original 1999 series ===
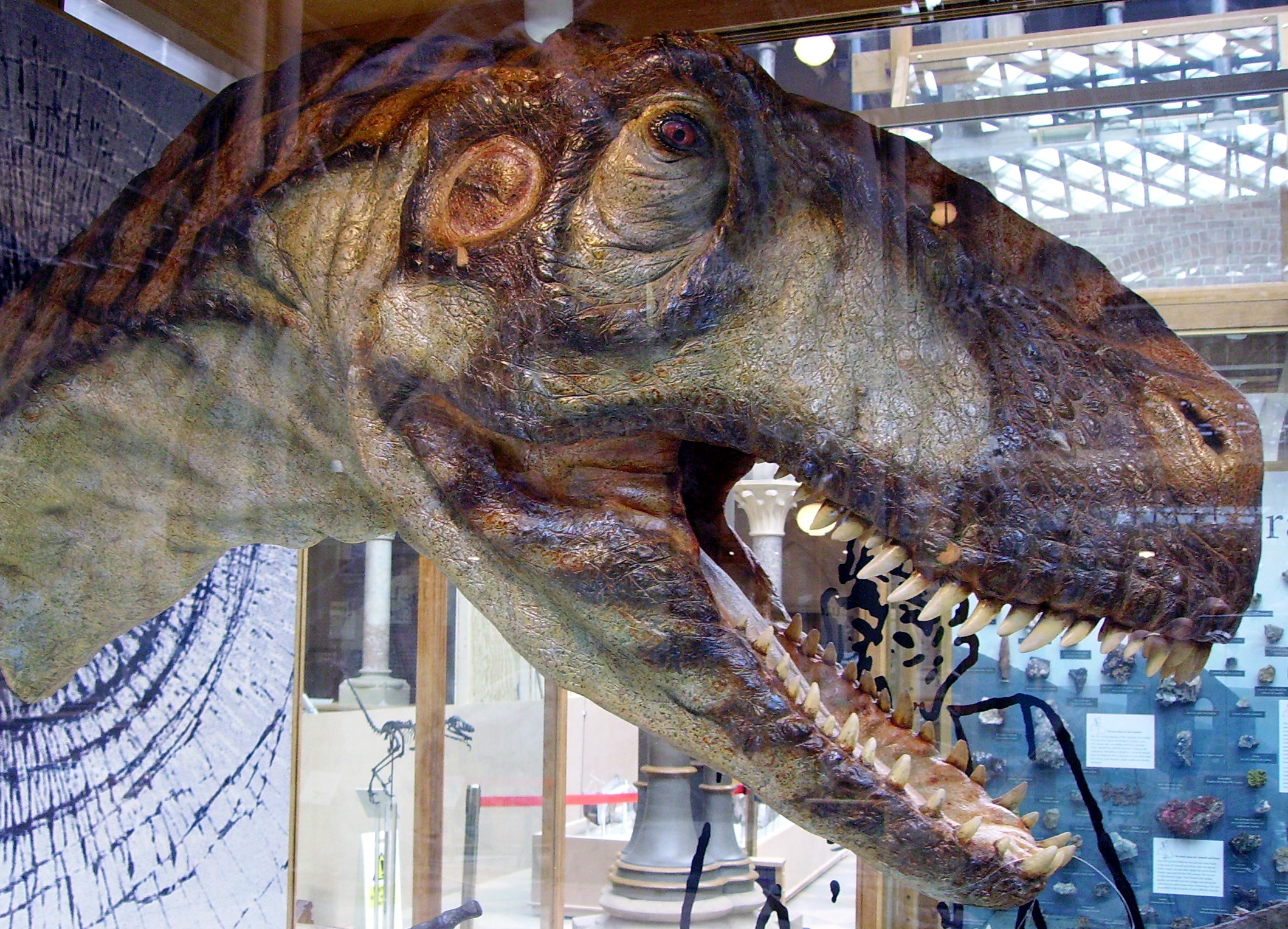
Puppet head of the dinosaur Eustreptospondylus, used in Walking with Dinosaurs (1999)

Walking with Dinosaurs was devised by the then BBC-employed science television producer Tim Haines in 1996. Inspired by the 1993 film Jurassic Park, Haines envisioned a more science-based documentary programme using the same techniques as Jurassic Park to bring dinosaurs to life. Though such a series was initially feared to be far too expensive to produce, particularly considering the production costs of Jurassic Park, Haines managed to bring down the costs through working with the award-winning UK-based graphics company Framestore. It was only after the production of a six-minute pilot episode in 1997 that Haines managed to secure funding for the series; Walking with Dinosaurs was funded by the BBC, BBC Worldwide and the Discovery Channel, alongside major investments from TV Asahi in Japan and ProSieben in Germany. At a cost of £6.1 million ($9.9 million), Walking with Dinosaurs cost over £37,654 ($61,112) per minute to produce, making it the most expensive documentary series per minute ever made. The visual effects of Walking with Dinosaurs were done by Framestore and the puppets and animatronics were done by the special effects company Crawley Creatures.

The success of Walking with Dinosaurs led to the rapid creation of Walking with... as a brand of documentary series. In the aftermath of Walking with Dinosaurs, Haines founded the production company Impossible Pictures together with Jasper James, one of the producers on Walking with Dinosaurs.

=== 2000s ===
2000 saw the release of a special episode of Dinosaurs, The Ballad of Big Al, focusing on a single Allosaurus specimen. The first entire sequel series released in 2001: Walking with Beasts, which explored the life of the Cenozoic, after the age of the dinosaurs. Like Walking with Dinosaurs before it, Beasts was the idea of Haines. Haines wished to introduce the general public to the assortment of animals of the Cenozoic, typically less represented in popular culture than the dinosaurs. Haines served as executive producer on the series, with James and Nigel Paterson producing and directing. Beasts was in terms of effects more challenging to produce than Dinosaurs, owing to mammals having features such as fur, whiskers, eyebrows and various floppy parts absent in dinosaurs, and to audiences being more familiar with how mammals move and act and thus better at spotting mistakes.

Initial cover for the companion book of the 2004 BBC series Space Odyssey, initially intended to be part of the Walking with... franchise as "Walking with Spacemen"

In late 2002 and early 2003, further special episodes of Dinosaurs were broadcast: Land of Giants and The Giant Claw. These specials starred wildlife presenter Nigel Marven as a "time-traveling zoologist". Marven's inclusion was mainly so that audiences would have a better understanding of the scale of the animals shown. While Haines, James and Impossible Pictures worked on Land of Giants and The Giant Claw, the BBC produced a further series without their involvement: Walking with Cavemen, also broadcast in 2003. Cavemen acted as a sequel to Beasts, exploring human evolution. The series was created by Richard Dale and Peter Georgi, both of whom had previously worked together on documentaries such as The Human Body, and starred Robert Winston as a presenter. The success of Land of Giants and The Giant Claw led to the creation of Sea Monsters, broadcast in 2003, a miniseries exploring the "seven deadliest seas of all time", once again starring Marven.

The series Space Odyssey (2004), produced by Haines and James at Impossible Pictures together with BBC Worldwide, the Discovery Channel and ProSieben, was originally going to be titled Walking with Spacemen. Both executives of the BBC and ProSieben heralded Walking with Spacemen as the logical next step in the series, following on from the journey began with Walking with Dinosaurs, Beasts and Cavemen. Space Odyssey used special effects and techniques from the Walking with... documentaries to speculate how astronauts may explore the various planets in the Solar System on crewed missions. Despite the title change, Space Odyssey has at times been referred to as Walking with Spacemen also after its release and the old title was used in some of the companion material, including as the title of the earliest editions of the companion book, co-authored by Haines and Christopher Riley.

Instead of a futuristic series, Haines and Impossible Pictures decided to round off the Walking with... series by making a programme on the before then largely underutilized Paleozoic era, set before the dinosaurs. Walking with Monsters, broadcast in 2005, utilized the most sophisticated effects of the entire franchise, owing to advancements in technology by the time of its production.

Framestore and Crawley Creatures returned to do the computer graphics and animatronics, respectively, for every successor series produced by Impossible Pictures. Walking with Cavemen which involved Framestore but not Crawley Creatures. Practical effects of Walking with Cavemen were done by several companies, including Altered States FX, Animated Extras and BGFX. After the release of Monsters, Impossible Pictures, Framestore and the others involved were effectively forced to move on from documentary filmmaking and produce other series like Primeval (2007–2011) due to companies and executives losing interest in funding fact-based documentaries on prehistoric life.

== Original television series ==
Walking with... original series
Series	Release date (UK)	Director(s)	Producer(s)	Episodes	Narrator (UK)	Composer
Walking with Dinosaurs	4 October – 8 November 1999	Tim Haines & Jasper James	John Lynch, Tim Haines & Jasper James	6	Kenneth Branagh	Ben Bartlett
The Ballad of Big Al	25 December 2000	Kate Bartlett	Mick Kaczorowski, Tim Haines & Joshua C. Berkley	1	Kenneth Branagh	Ben Bartlett
Walking with Beasts	15 November – 20 December 2001	Jasper James & Nigel Paterson	Tim Haines, Jasper James & Nigel Paterson	6	Kenneth Branagh	Ben Bartlett
The Giant Claw / Land of Giants	30 December 2002 – 1 January 2003	Tim Haines & Jasper James	Tim Haines, Gaynelle Evans, Adam Kemp & Jasper James	2	Nigel Marven (Note: Also presenter in the series)	Ben Bartlett
Walking with Cavemen	27 March – 23 April 2003	Richard Dale	Richard Dale, Peter Georgi, Nick Green, Mark Hedgecoe & Peter Oxley	4	Robert Winston (Note: Also presenter in the series)	Alan Parker
Sea Monsters	9–23 November 2003	Jasper James	Tim Haines, Adam Kemp & Jasper James	3	Karen Hayley (Note: Nigel Marven also stars in the series as a presenter)	Ben Bartlett
Walking with Monsters	5 November 2005 (Note: Walking with Monsters first aired as an omnibus version, cut together into a single 90-minute instalment, on 5 November 2005. The series as divided into three episodes first aired a month later, 8–19 December 2005.)	Chloe Leland	Tim Haines & Chloe Leland	3	Kenneth Branagh	Ben Bartlett
Walking with Dinosaurs	25 May – 29 June 2025	Kirsty Wilson	Tom Hewitson, Stephen Cooter, & Owen Gower	6	Bertie Carvel	Ty Unwin

=== Walking with Dinosaurs (1999) ===
Envisioned as the first "Natural History of Dinosaurs" and a series that would provide viewers with "a window into a lost world", Walking with Dinosaurs explores life in the Mesozoic era, particularly dinosaurs, in the format of a traditional nature documentary.

=== The Ballad of Big Al (2000) ===
The first special episode of Walking with Dinosaurs to be released was The Ballad of Big Al (2000). Big Al follows a single Allosaurus specimen nicknamed "Big Al" whose life story has been reconstructed based on a well-preserved fossil of the same name.

=== Walking with Beasts (2001) ===
Walking with Beasts follows Walking with Dinosaurs in showcasing prehistoric life in a nature documentary style. Beasts tracks animal life, particularly the rise of the mammals to dominance, in the Cenozoic era. The series also gives some insight into human evolution, with an episode devoted to Australopithecus and appearances by both Neanderthals and anatomically modern humans.

=== The Giant Claw / Land of Giants (2002–2003) ===
The two later specials, The Giant Claw (2002) and Land of Giants (2003), star "time-travelling zoologist" Nigel Marven as he travels back in time to encounter and interact with prehistoric life.

=== Walking with Cavemen (2003) ===
Walking with Cavemen follows Walking with Dinosaurs and Walking with Beasts in adopting the same nature documentary style, though this time involving presenter Robert Winston. Cavemen follows the story of human evolution through exploring key developments on the path from Australopithecus afarensis to modern humans. The programme often focuses on particular characters and their relationships to each other in order to be more accessible to viewers.

=== Sea Monsters (2003) ===
Sea Monsters once again stars Nigel Marven as a "time-traveling zoologist" who this time travels to seven different periods of time in prehistory, diving in the "seven deadliest seas of all time" and encountering and interacting with the prehistoric creatures who inhabit them.

=== Walking with Monsters (2005) ===
Serving as a prequel series to Walking with Dinosaurs, Walking with Monsters explores the prehistoric life of the Paleozoic era. The series focuses on "the struggle for the survival of the fittest", using stories of individual animals to cast the Palaeozoic as a long "war" between various animal groups for dominance, some of which are described within the context of the series as being distantly related to humans.

=== Walking with Dinosaurs (2025) ===
A revival of the franchise, the 2025 series recounts the stories of six individual dinosaurs. Each episode is divided between prehistoric segments of CGI animals set in live action landscapes, and modern day segments involving paleontologist activities at the dig sites where each dinosaur was discovered.

== Film ==
On 23 December 2013 a film adaptation based on the original 1999 Walking with Dinosaurs series it received generally negative reviews from critics and was a box-office bomb.

== Play ==
Was a live play adaptation of the 1999 series which first played in Australia in 2007 then later North America, Europe, Asia, New Zealand and then the last show on 22nd December 2019 in Taiwan.

== Reception ==
=== Accolades ===
Award	Category	Walking with Dinosaurs	The Ballad of Big Al	Walking with Beasts	Land of Giants/The Giant Claw	Walking with Cavemen	Sea Monsters	Walking with Monsters
Annie Award	Technical Achievement in the Field of Animation	Won						
BAFTA TV Award	Outstanding Innovation	Won						
BAFTA TV Award	Best Original Television Music	Won						
BAFTA TV Award	Interactive Entertainment Award			Won				
BAFTA TV Award	Best Sound (Factual)			Nominated				
BAFTA TV Award	Best Visual Effects & Graphic Design			Nominated	Won		Won	Nominated
Primetime Emmy Award	Outstanding Animated Programme (One Hour or More)	Won	Won	Won	Won			Won
Primetime Emmy Award	Outstanding Special Visual Effects for a Miniseries, Movie or a Special	Won	Nominated					
Primetime Emmy Award	Outstanding Music Composition for a Miniseries, Movie, or a Special	Nominated		Nominated				
Primetime Emmy Award	Outstanding Achievement in Non-Fiction Programming	Nominated						
Primetime Emmy Award	Outstanding Achievement in Non-Fiction Programming - Sound Mixing	Nominated						
Primetime Emmy Award	Outstanding Achievement in Non-Fiction Programming – Sound Editing	Won						
Primetime Emmy Award	Outstanding Sound Editing for a Non-Fiction Program		Won					
Monitor Award	Film Originated Television Specials - 3D Animation			Won				
National Television Award	Most Popular Factual Programme	Nominated						
Online Film & Television Association Award	Best Visual Effects in a Series		Won					
Online Film & Television Association Award	Best Informational Special		Won					
Golden Laurel Award	Best Original Television Music	Nominated						
Peabody Award	Peabody Award	Won						
RTS Television Award	Design and Craft Innovation	Won						
RTS Television Award	Best Visual Effects - Digital Effects	Won						
RTS Television Award	Best Picture Manipulation	Nominated						
RTS Television Award	Multi-Media and Interactive			Won				
RTS Television Award	Best Presenter (Factual)				Nominated		Nominated	
TV Quick Award	Best Factual Programme	Won						
TCA Award	Outstanding Achievement in News and Information	Nominated						
TRIC Award	Documentary Programme of the Year	Won						
Visual Effects Society Award	Outstanding Visual Effects in a Television Series						Nominated	
Young Artist Award	Best Educational TV Show or Series	Won						

=== Viewership ===
Walking with Dinosaurs was broadcast to record audiences in 1999 and is sometimes considered the biggest science documentary series ever created. With 15 million viewers viewing the first episode on 4 October 1999 and another 3.91 million viewing it on its repeat the Sunday afterwards, Walking with Dinosaurs is by far the most watched science programme in British television history. Viewership figures steadily declined for later series; the first airing of the first episode of Walking with Beasts in 2001 had around 8 million viewers and the first airing of the first episode of Walking with Monsters in 2005 attracted 4.57 million viewers.

The ratings shown below are 7-day data, including both the original airings of the episodes and their repeats some days later. There is only data for the top 30 programmes in terms of viewers; episodes labeled N/A failed to reach the top 30 programmes during their airings.

Walking with... : UK viewers per episode (millions)

Series	Episode number						Average
Series	1	2	3	4	5	6	Average
Walking with Dinosaurs	18.91	17.75	17.96	16.8	15.95	15.68	17.18
The Ballad of Big Al	N/A	–					N/A
Walking with Beasts	13.99	11.34	9.27	N/A	5.87	9.48	9.99
The Giant Claw & Land of Giants	6.83	5.76	–				6.30
Walking with Cavemen	7.63	6.21	N/A	N/A	–		6.92
Sea Monsters	7.59	6.94	6.52	–			7.02
Walking with Monsters	4.57	N/A	N/A	–			4.57
Walking with Dinosaurs (2025)	2.99	2.47	2.54	N/A	2.33	N/A	2.58

Audience measurement performed by Broadcasters' Audience Research Board

== Prehistoric Planet ==
Prehistoric Planet is a revision of Walking with Dinosaurs and Walking with Beasts, done by Discovery Channel and NBC for the Discovery Kids network in 2002–2003. Though the producers kept most of the original animation, David Bock and Peter Sherman wrote new text for a younger target audience, narrated by Ben Stiller (in Season 1) and Christian Slater (in Season 2), and interspersed the scenes with occasional quizzes to act as bumpers around the commercial breaks. New music was incorporated as well. Most marketing and advertising for the series focused on the dinosaur episodes. In addition, the final episode, Prehistoric Planet Top 10, focused solely on the creatures from Walking with Dinosaurs.

== Books ==
=== Companion books ===
The first four Walking with... series were accompanied with companion books. These books were coffee table books exploring the settings from each series in detail, with scientific information, facts and narratives similar to those shown on screen. All of the books were illustrated with stills from the episodes.

- Walking with Dinosaurs: A Natural History (1999), by Tim Haines
- Walking with Beasts: A Prehistoric Safari (2001), by Tim Haines
- Walking with Cavemen: Stand Eye-to-Eye with your Ancestors (2003), by John Lynch and Louise Barrett
- Sea Monsters: Prehistoric Predators of the Deep (2003), by Nigel Marven and Jasper James
- Walking with Dinosaurs (2025), by Andrew Cohen, Helen Thomas, and Kirsty Wilson

=== Other books ===
Walking with Monsters was accompanied by the book The Complete Guide to Prehistoric Life, an encyclopedia and reference work with images from the entire franchise, co-authored by Haines and Paul Chambers. In addition to the companion books and The Complete Guide to Prehistoric Life, several other books have been released to accompany the different series. Walking with Dinosaurs was in addition to its companion book also accompanied by Walking with Dinosaurs: The Evidence (2000) by David Martill and Darren Naish and Walking with Dinosaurs: The Facts (2000) by Michael Benton, both books serving to corroborate the science behind the series, Walking with Dinosaurs: Dinosaur World (2000) and Walking with Dinosaurs Annual 2001 (2000) were also released, along with Walking with Dinosaurs: How Big is a Dinosaur? (1999) being the first and then a reprint in 2004.

Among the various children's books that have been released alongside the Walking with... documentaries is a children's book adaptation of The Ballad of Big Al by Stephen Cole, titled Allosaurus! The Life and Death of Big Al, as well as 3D albums, sticker albums and photo journals for both Walking with Dinosaurs and Walking with Beasts. A sticker book based of the 2013 film was released in 2013 called Walking with Dinosaurs The 3D Movie: A Reusable Stciker Book, and various other books like Walking with Dinosaurs The 3D Movie Handbook (2013), Walking with Dinosaurs The 3D Movie The Winter Ground (2013), Walking with Dinosaurs The 3D Movie Friends Stick Together (2013), Walking with Dinosaurs The 3D Movie Patchi's Big Adventure (2013), Walking with Dinosaurs The 3D Movie The Great Migration (2013) and Walking with Dinosaurs The 3D Movie Dinopedia (2013).

=== Magazines ===
The Walking with Dinosaurs magazine was published for 17 issues 2000-2001. Each issue focused on a specific dinosaur, pterosaur or marine reptile, with a poster.

A magazine called Giant Walking with Dinosaurs Special was released BBC Magazines in December 2000.

== Electronic media ==
With the exception of Walking with Monsters, all of the Walking with... series launched with accompanying websites. The original 1999 Walking with Dinosaurs website was considered innovative for the time and included scientific information, fact files, glossaries, as well as games and puzzles. The content of the websites of following series was similar, offering both accompanying scientific information and games.

In addition to the games on the website, full Walking with... games have also been developed. The first such game was the freeware video game Dinosaur World, developed by Asylum Entertainment and published by the BBC Imagineering in June 2001. Dinosaur World is an adaptation of The Ballad of Big Al where players try to find various animals and plants. The game was never finished but could be downloaded from the BBC website in its alpha form. There was also a video game adaptation of Walking with Beasts, Walking with Beasts: Operation Salvage, developed by Absolute Studios and published by BBC Worldwide Ltd. in 2001. Operation Salvage is a top-down shooter where players travel back in time to observe animals and fight time-traveling enemies. Another Walking with Dinosaurs game was released in 2013, titled simply Walking with Dinosaurs, to accompany the film adaptation of the series released that year. Walking with Dinosaurs is an augmented reality game developed by Supermassive Games in collaboration with the BBC.

== Toys ==
=== 1999 Series Toy Line ===
The 1999 Walking with Dinosaurs series had a toy line by Toyway, there were twelve toys in the line, a Ornithocheirus was released in Walking with Dinosaurs Magazine.

=== Film toy line ===
The Walking with Dinosaurs: Movie had a toy line typically sold as "Walking with Dinosaurs The 3D Movie". Figures included were boxed action figures of characters and dinosaurs from the film, a Gorgon mask and Gorgon stomping feet based on the main antagonist Gorgon from the film.

== Board Games ==
A board game and card game based on the 1999 series was released in 2000, then a board game based on the film called "Walking with Dinosaurs The 3D Movie: The Game" was released in 2012.

== Soundtracks ==
=== 1999 Series ===
The soundtrack for the series was released on 11 April 2000. It was composed by Ben Bartlett and the BBC Concert Orchestra, and released by BBC Music. It was re-released in 2024 for the 25th anniversary, with additional music from The Ballad of Big Al.

=== Walking with Beasts ===
The soundtrack to Walking with Beasts was released in 2001. It was composed by Ben Bartlett and released by BBC Music. It was re-released in 2024 for the 25th anniversary.

=== Walking with Dinosaurus: The Arena Spectacular ===
The arena spectacular was released as a soundtrack in 2007 and 2008, under the name "Walking with Dinosaurs: The Live Experience".

=== Film ===
The film soundtrack was released in 2013. It was composed by Paul Leonard-Morgan and released by Sony Classical Records and Metroplis Movie Music labels.
