= Michael Olmert =

American dramatist

Michael Olmert (born 1940) is a professor of English at the University of Maryland, College Park and a writer. He was born and raised in Washington D.C. His specialty is British Literature. He has a Ph.D. from Maryland in medieval English literature. He has written many shows and television movies for National Geographic, and many articles for the Colonial Williamsburg Magazine.

He has written over 90 television documentaries, two plays, and two books. He has been awarded 3 Emmy Awards for his work on the Discovery Channel. In 2001, he received one for writing Allosaurus: A Walking With Dinosaurs Special. In 2003, he won for Walking With Prehistoric Beasts. His third award came in 2006 for Before the Dinosaurs.

Olmert's two plays are entitled Shakespeare and Lopez and Great Creating Nature. The two books he has published are Milton's Teeth and Ovid's Umbrella (1996) and The Smithsonian Book of Books (1992).

He was inducted into the University of Maryland Hall of Fame in 2005.

He currently lives in Wittman, Maryland with his wife Meg, who is also a writer.
