= Sea Monsters (TV series) =

2003 British television documentary series

- Cover of an Indonesian DVD release
- Also known as: Chased by Sea Monsters
- Genre: Nature documentary
- Created by: Jasper James
- Directed by: Jasper James
- Presented by: Nigel Marven
- Narrated by: Karen Hayley; Christopher Cook (US)
- Composer: Ben Bartlett
- Country of origin: United Kingdom
- Original language: English
- No. of episodes: 3

Production
- Executive producers: Tim Haines; Adam Kemp
- Producer: Jasper James
- Cinematography: John Howarth; Michael Pitts; Peter Thorn
- Editors: Andrew Wilks; Tom Parker
- Running time: 30 minutes
- Production companies: BBC Studios Science Unit; Impossible Pictures
- Budget: £3 million

Original release
- Network: BBC, Discovery Channel, ProSieben
- Release: 9 November – 23 November 2003

Sea Monsters, (Note: Full title: Sea Monsters: A Walking with Dinosaurs Trilogy) marketed as Chased by Sea Monsters in the United States, is a 2003 three-part nature documentary television miniseries created by Impossible Pictures and produced by the BBC Studios Science Unit, the Discovery Channel and ProSieben. Following in the footsteps of The Giant Claw (2002) and Land of Giants (2003), special episodes of the nature documentary series Walking with Dinosaurs, Sea Monsters stars British wildlife presenter Nigel Marven as a "time-travelling zoologist" who travels to seven different periods of time in prehistory, diving in the "seven deadliest seas of all time" and encountering and interacting with the prehistoric creatures who inhabit them. The series is narrated by Karen Hayley in the BBC version and by Christopher Cook in the American version.

As with previous documentaries in the Walking with... franchise, Sea Monsters recreated extinct animals through a combination of computer-generated imagery and animatronics, incorporated into live action footage shot at various locations. The visual effects of Sea Monsters, as with previous series, received praise and won a BAFTA TV Award. For his role as the presenter of the series, Marven was nominated for a Royal Television Society Programme award. Though some reviewers praised Marven's energetic and enthusiastic "animal-grabbing" style of presentation, others considered a wildlife presenter to be unnecessary or even "patronising", paralleling debates on the merits of wildlife presenters in documentaries on modern-day animals.

A companion book, Sea Monsters: Prehistoric Predators of the Deep (published as Chased by Sea Monsters: Prehistoric Predators of the Deep in the United States), was co-authored by Marven and Jasper James, producer and director of the series. The book received positive reviews, with reviewers noting that though it was based on a TV series, it also stood on its own as an information source about extinct sea creatures. In 2011, an exhibition based on the series, the Sea Monsters Exhibition, was held at Bournemouth International Centre in Dorset. In addition to imagery from the series, the exhibition featured full-scale models of both modern and prehistoric sea creatures as well as behind-the-scenes information on how the animals were reconstructed and brought "back to life".

== Premise ==
Following in the footsteps of The Giant Claw (2002) and Land of Giants (2003), special episodes of the nature documentary series Walking with Dinosaurs, Sea Monsters sees time-travelling zoologist Nigel Marven travel back in time to encounter and interact with prehistoric life. Whereas both of the previous specials took place on land and were confined to a single setting, (Note: Both the previous series Walking with Dinosaurs (1999) and Walking with Beasts (2001) had episodes focused on aquatic life.) Sea Monsters focuses on the aquatic life of seven different geological periods between 4 and 450 million years ago. Travelling on this prehistoric safari with his boat, The Ancient Mariner, Marven aims to dive in the seven deadliest seas of all time, searching for the most dangerous sea creatures to ever live.

The titular prehistoric "sea monsters" encountered throughout the series include the giant orthocone (Cameroceras), an enormous primitive cephalopod, the armor-plated giant predatory fish Dunkleosteus, the giant pliosaur Liopleurodon, the early whale Basilosaurus, and megalodon, the largest shark to ever live. The series culminates in the "deadliest sea of all time", the Cretaceous ocean. Dubbed "Hell's Aquarium", this sea is determined to be the most dangerous due to the sheer number of different predators present, including 17-metre (56 ft) giant mosasaurs (Tylosaurus). In addition to providing information on the animals encountered, Marven's presence also serves to provide a sense of scale and dread throughout the series.

Like the previous specials, Sea Monsters is a definite step away from traditionally narrated documentaries, such as the original 1999 series of Walking with Dinosaurs. In comparison with the original series of Walking with Dinosaurs, Sea Monsters is considerably more action-oriented, with Marven frequently interacting with the animals. Though entertainment and adventure is a bigger focus than in previous entries in the franchise, the series still ultimately aims to be an educational documentary, weaving facts into the action and intending to teach viewers about the extinct animals it portrays.

== Production ==
Nigel Marven holding a sea scorpion in the first episode of Sea Monsters. The appearance and behaviour of the sea scorpions in the series were developed with the help of palaentologist Simon Braddy.

Sea Monsters was created by Impossible Pictures, the same production team as previous entries in the Walking with... series, such as Walking with Dinosaurs (1999) and Walking with Beasts (2001). The same technologies used to restore the animals in the previous series were used to reconstruct the prehistoric creatures and environments showcased in Sea Monsters, with computer-generated animals and animatronics being used for the animals and background footage being shot in real natural environments. Filming the series took over seven months. Among others, filming locations included the oceans around New Zealand and the shores of the Red Sea in Egypt. Filming by the Red Sea was done covertly as the production team had to dodge Egyptian military police.

Following his work in The Giant Claw and Land of Giants, Marven was approached by Jasper James, producer of both episodes and director of Land of Giants, about Sea Monsters. Marven had a great passion for sharks and had already dived and swum together with the biggest sharks alive today, which led James to come up with the idea of a time-travelling programme in which Marven immersed himself in the deadliest seas of all time, diving with the largest sharks of all time as well as various other prehistoric sea creatures. Marven was enthusiastic about the project, referring to it as a "mouthwatering prospect" in the companion book to the series. The series was narrated by Karen Hayley.

As for previous series, the animatronic creatures used in Sea Monsters were created by special effects company Crawley Creatures. The visual effects were created by visual effects company Framestore, which had also worked on previous series in the Walking with... franchise. The team at Framestore worked for more than a year to deliver the nineteen computer-generated creatures featured in the series. By the time Sea Monsters entered production, the team at Framestore were already familiar with what techniques to use due to their past experience on the previous series. As a result, they were able to refine their work process and spend more time on each creature. Whereas an evening had been the normal rendering time for a shot with CGI creatures in previous series, a single shot when a megalodon passes Marven's shark cage in Sea Monsters took two weeks to render.

In total, the series took one and a half years to make. BBC News reported that it cost £3 million to make, whereas Der Spiegel reported a cost of €8 million (~ £5.3 million). Sea Monsters was announced alongside the rest of the BBC:s 2003 autumn shows on 29 July 2003, marketed as an "underwater version" of Walking with Dinosaurs, with prehistoric sea animals recreated using sophisticated computer imagery.

According to James, producer and director of the series, the animals in Sea Monsters were reconstructed based on "as many sources as possible". James went on to say that the production team "talked to palaeontologists and zoologists so that we could be as accurate as we possibly could". As an example, the sea scorpions, an extinct group of chelicerate arthropods encountered by Marven in the Ordovician, were developed and refined based on the input from Simon Braddy, a palaeontologist at Bristol University. According to Braddy, the initial models of the sea scorpions were "not very good at all" but following revisions based on Braddy's input, he believed that the final version of the sea scorpions was "just right", with the animals being portrayed as accurately as possible. One scene depicts the sea scorpions congregating on a beach, which Braddy stated fits with current theories that sea scorpions "would congregate en masse on the beaches to mate and moult".

== Episodes ==
No.	Title	Time periods	Directed by	Original release date	U.K. viewers (millions)
1	"Dangerous Seas"	Ordovician, Triassic & Devonian	Jasper James	9 November 2003	7.59
Nigel travels back in time to the seventh deadliest sea of all time, the Ordovician period (450 million years ago, New York), where he is attacked by sea scorpions and comes face-to-face with a giant orthocone. He then explores the sixth deadliest sea, the Triassic (230 million years ago, Switzerland), where he encounters a pair of Nothosaurus, the bizarre sea reptile Tanystropheus and the giant primitive predatory ichthyosaur Cymbospondylus, which Nigel keeps at bay through using a cattle prod. Nigel then dives in the fifth deadliest sea, the Devonian (360 million years ago, Ohio). In the Devonian, Nigel encounters the strange primitive shark Stethacanthus and the placoderm Bothriolepis and he uses a rounded shark cage to protect himself from the giant predatory placoderm Dunkleosteus.
2	"Into the Jaws of Death"	Devonian, Eocene & Pliocene	Jasper James	16 November 2003	6.94
Leaving the Devonian, Nigel travels forward in time to the fourth deadliest sea, the Eocene (36 million years ago, Egypt), where he encounters the strange elephant-related Arsinoitherium. Diving in the Tethys Sea, Nigel encounters the primitive whale Dorudon and the crew of The Ancient Mariner uses recorded whale sounds to attract the giant predatory primitive whale Basilosaurus. In the third deadliest sea, the Pliocene (4 million years ago, Peru), Nigel encounters the strange whale Odobenocetops and dives with an adolescent megalodon shark. He later uses the rounded shark cage to dive with an adult megalodon, the largest shark of all time.
3	"To Hell..... and Back?"	Pliocene, Jurassic & Cretaceous	Jasper James	23 November 2003	6.52
After leaving the Pliocene, Nigel explores the second deadliest sea, the Jurassic (155 million years ago, England). There, he meets the giant filter-feeding fish Leedsichthys and predators such as the shark Hybodus and the marine crocodile Metriorhynchus. The apex predator of the Jurassic sea is the giant pliosaur Liopleurodon, which Nigel keeps away through spraying putrescine at them when they approach him. Nigel then travels to "Hell's aquarium", the Cretaceous (75 million years ago, Western Interior Seaway). The sheer number of different predators present, including sharks, giant predatory fish Xiphactinus and giant mosasaurs, makes the Cretaceous the deadliest sea of all time. In addition to predators, Nigel also encounters a variety of other Cretaceous animals, such as the aquatic bird Hesperornis, plesiosaur Elasmosaurus, pterosaur Pteranodon and giant sea turtle Archelon.

== Reception ==
=== Reviews ===
Writing for The Spectator, Simon Hoggart praised Sea Monsters, calling it "terrific". Hoggart especially praised Marven's work as the presenter of the series, writing that he had "the boyish enthusiasm of Jamie Oliver, cheerily leaping overboard to find more terrifying computer simulations" and that Marven "may well be a computer simulation himself". The only aspect of the series Hoggart considered to be a drawback was the narration, which he found to be "drippy" and "drivelling".

Brother Paul Hoggart gave the series a negative review in The Times. Though Hoggart wrote that previous entries in the Walking with... series had "despite some questionable voiceovers" been "amazing and terrific fun", he stated that Sea Monsters was "too short on monsters and much too long on Nigel Marvin [sic] trying to act "scared" as a graphic of a giant squid in an ice-cream cone supposedly approaches him". Hoggart also believed the inclusion of a presenter in the previous series Walking with Cavemen (2003, featuring Robert Winston) to have been "silly" and wrote in regards to Sea Monsters that "if you are worried the horse might get tired, for heaven's sake don't dress it up in a costume."

=== Awards ===
In 2004, Sea Monsters won a BAFTA TV Award for Best Visual Effects. The series was also nominated for a Visual Effects Society Award for Outstanding Visual Effects in a Television Series. For his work in Sea Monsters and in the preceding Land of Giants, Nigel Marven was nominated for a Royal Television Society Programme award for best presenter (factual).

=== Inclusion of a presenter ===
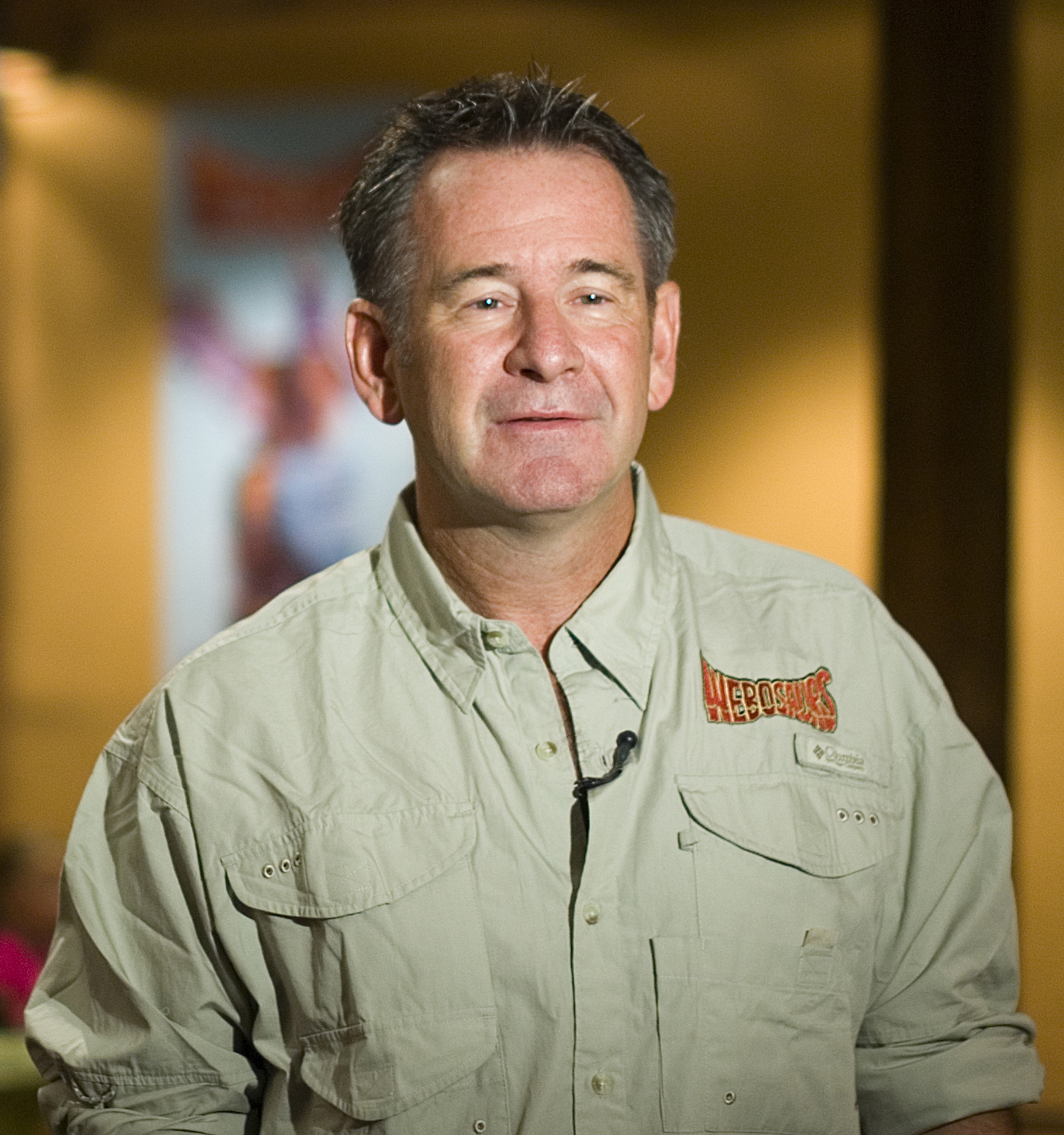
Nigel Marven (pictured) was nominated for an award for his role as the presenter, but the reception to including a presenter in the first place was mixed, some praising it and viewing it as an evolution of previous techniques in the Walking with... series and others finding it patronising. The discussion is not exclusive to Sea Monsters, and has also been held about the role of presenters in wildlife documentaries in general.

The inclusion of a presenter instead of just narration was notably criticised by evolutionary biologist Richard Dawkins, who stated that "I think the Nigel Marven programmes are awful, awful - really naff". Dawkins elaborated, saying that "it is as though they think the public are so stupid that they can't enjoy the spectacle of the animals themselves" and "isn't it at least patronising and condescending when television people assume, without asking them, that their audiences can't cope with science unless the pill is coated with the sugar of personal anecdote?". Defending Sea Monsters, Jasper James did not believe that the series was patronising, stating that "if you can enjoy the drama of a programme while learning something then that's great".

The inclusion of a wildlife presenter in Sea Monsters and in the preceding specials was interpreted by researcher Vincent Campbell in 2008 as an evolution of the techniques already used in Walking with Dinosaurs, where some animals were depicted as affecting the camera filming them, such as a Tyrannosaurus roaring, leading to the camera lens being covered with saliva. Campbell stated that the appearance of presenter-led programmes on prehistoric animals could be seen as a way to incorporate the traditional way of depicting prehistoric animals as "movie monsters", but adapting it for a nature documentary context. Campbell also commented that the merits of wildlife presenters in nature documentaries is a broader topic beyond just Sea Monsters. The unorthodox "animal-grabbing" and energetic presentation style used by presenters such as Marven and Steve Irwin has been a point of controversy in documentaries on modern wildlife as well. In 2016, Campbell maintained his previous assessment, writing that the inclusion of Marven, as with scenes where animals affected the camera in previous series, served to reinforce the realism of the series. As per Campbell, the scenes were Marven interacts with animals were "constructed to match similar scenes in presenter-led natural history films of the Steve Irwin mould".

As with past entries into the Walking with... series, some scientists feared that Sea Monsters sacrificed scientific accuracy for drama and entertainment. Parts of the series, such as mating behaviour of the various animals, can only ever be speculation and guess work, but it is not made clear what is and is not fact in the programme itself. Dawkins pointed out that "In Nigel Marven's past programmes they didn't give the viewer any indication of what is known and what is conjecture". In response to such fears, James stated that nothing in the series was said "unless there was some evidence for it".

== Influence ==
Palaeontologists have cited Sea Monsters as inspirational for their careers. Jack A. Cooper, who led a team investigating the body size of megalodon and published a study concerning it in 2020, cited the animal's appearance in Sea Monsters as the inspiration that made him pursue a career in palaeontology and inspired him to study the ancient shark. Cooper was six years old at the time the programme first aired and remembered being both terrified and captivated. Following the paper's publication, Nigel Marven tweeted his congratulations to Cooper.

== In other media ==
=== Companion book ===
Jasper James and Nigel Marven co-authored a companion book for the series, titled Sea Monsters: Prehistoric Predators of the Deep (published in the United States as Chased by Sea Monsters: Prehistoric Predators of the Deep). The book begins with a description of the Big Bang, before going through the seven periods of time featured in the series, from the Ordovician to the Pliocene, referred to as the "seven most deadly seas of all time". Each chapter features renderings of the animals as seen in the series and sidebars feature information about each of the featured animals, including how to pronounce their names, their classification, their size and their diet.

In a review in The Science Teacher, LaRue Sellers praised the book, writing that despite it being based on a TV programme, the book "stands alone as an outstanding source of information about ocean predators from each geologic era". Sellers concluded that "this book would make a great addition to any high school teacher's library" and that "students could use it as a reference source, and they will definitely be captivated by the wonderful illustrations". A review of the book in Publishers Weekly called it "fascinating, if somewhat unsophisticated", lending much focus to more captivating aspects of prehistoric life such as size and teeth, and noted that "the book's combination of sensationalism, lurid graphics and solid scientific exposition is well judged to stimulate budding paleontologists".

=== Website ===
An accompanying website to Sea Monsters was launched in 2003, featuring a countdown list of the seven seas featured in the series, fact files on the different animals and a flash game, the Sea Monsters adventure game, where players complete tasks in order to survive the different prehistoric seas.

=== Exhibition ===
An exhibition based on the series, the Sea Monsters Exhibition, was held at the Bournemouth International Centre in Dorset from 23 July to 11 September 2011. The exhibition showcased large animals alive in the oceans today, such as the giant squid, great white shark and basking shark, alongside prehistoric sea creatures, such as Liopleurodon and Leedsichthys. In addition to creatures showcased in the Sea Monsters series, the exhibition also featured some animals that were not featured in the original series, such as the Cambrian predator Anomalocaris. Modern and prehistoric creatures were not presented just through photographs and renderings from Sea Monsters, but also in the form of full-scale models, created by Avalanche Studios, allowing visitors to see their size. Other interactive features of the exhibition included a sandpit, where children could dig for fossils, a painting station where children could paint their own dinosaurs, and a big green screen where visitors could see themselves next to various prehistoric sea creatures. In addition to depictions of the sea creatures themselves, the exhibition also included behind-the-scenes information on the technology and techniques used to bring the prehistoric animals "back to life".
