= The Complete Guide to Prehistoric Life =

2006 book

- USA cover
- Authors: Tim Haines; Paul Chambers
- Language: English
- Genre: Reference work
- Publisher: Firefly Books
- Publication date: 1 October 2005
- Publication place: United Kingdom
- Pages: 216 pages
- ISBN: 1-55407-125-9
- OCLC: 60834094

The Complete Guide to Prehistoric Life is a 2005 encyclopedia featuring 111 of the prehistoric animals from the Walking with... series, as well as an additional one (Homo floresiensis). It was published in 2005 by Firefly Books, and written by Tim Haines with Paul Chambers. It accompanies all of the main programs in the Walking with... series, including specials The Ballad of Big Al, The Giant Claw and Land of Giants but excluding Walking with Cavemen.

== Contents ==
The book opens with an introduction by the authors reflecting on the making of the TV series. The book is then divided into three parts by era, first of which is The Rise of Life, which covers the Precambrian and the Paleozoic Era. The second part, The Age of Reptiles, covers the Mesozoic Era. The third and final part, The Age of Beasts, covers the Cenozoic Era. The book concludes with a timescale of life on earth, tree of life diagrams.

== Reception ==
Stuart Sumida, writing in The Quarterly Review of Biology, stated that "The authors make a valiant attempt to clear locality and phylogenetic perspectives, but it is a mixed bag. They are properly up to date on the theropod origin of feathers and birds, yet they are a quarter century behind on mammalian ancestors, still calling them mammal-like reptiles as opposed to Synapsida." He also noted that "a survey of colleagues generated a list of errors in virtually every section of the book" but concluded that the book is "a visual tour de force, confirming that computer generated (CG)-based reconstructions have justifiably joined the more traditional disciplines of sculpture, drawing, and painting in paleobiological art. In the end, it is visually impressive, but its textual potential remains unrealized."

Joanna K. Kowalewska and Michał Kowalewski writing in Palaeontologia Electronica found that "The compendium’s encyclopedic scope makes the guide necessarily akin to a cookbook. That is, you don’t read it for its plot. But, as with all successful encyclopedic renderings, its value resides in its detailed, beautifully illustrated, and lucidly organized descriptions. In this case, descriptions pertain to the most exciting topic of all: the fossils." They conclude, "All in all, The Complete Guide to Prehistoric Life is a great encyclopedic compendium, especially for those who are interested in spectacular fossils or happen to have pre-college family members. The book also has a potential to evolve into a valuable teaching reference for K-12 educators, who develop courses that include aspects of paleontology and evolution."
