= Prehistoric Planet (disambiguation) =

Prehistoric Planet is a 2022 documentary series on Apple TV+ in collaboration with the BBC.

It may also refer to:

- Prehistoric Planet (2002 TV series), a re-editing of Walking with Dinosaurs and Walking with Beasts for American broadcast
- Walking With Dinosaurs: Prehistoric Planet 3D, a 2014 edit of the Walking with Dinosaurs film.
