= Walking with Monsters =

2005 British television documentary series

- Cover of the original UK DVD release
- Also known as: Before the Dinosaurs
- Genre: Nature documentary Docudrama
- Created by: Andrew Wilks; Chloe Leland; Tim Haines
- Directed by: Chloe Leland
- Narrated by: Kenneth Branagh; Edward Gero (US)
- Composer: Ben Bartlett
- Country of origin: United Kingdom
- Original language: English
- No. of episodes: 3

Production
- Executive producer: Tim Haines
- Producer: Chloe Leland
- Running time: 30 minutes
- Production companies: BBC Studios Science Unit; Impossible Pictures
- Budget: £3 million

Original release
- Network: BBC, Discovery Channel, ProSieben, France 3
- Release: 5 November 2005

Walking with Monsters – Life Before Dinosaurs, marketed as Before the Dinosaurs – Walking with Monsters in North America, is a 2005 three-part nature documentary television miniseries created by Impossible Pictures and produced by the BBC Studios Science Unit, the Discovery Channel, ProSieben and France 3. Walking with Monsters explores life in the Paleozoic era, showcasing the early development of groups such as arthropods, fish, amphibians, reptiles and synapsids. Like its predecessors Walking with Dinosaurs (1999) and Walking with Beasts (2001), Walking with Monsters is narrated by Kenneth Branagh.

Walking with Monsters is the final installment in the Walking with... series of documentaries and was envisioned as completing the series' so-called "Trilogy of Life", the previous Walking with Dinosaurs and Walking with Beasts having explored the Mesozoic and Cenozoic, respectively. Like its predecessors, Walking with Monsters employs computer-generated imagery and animatronics, as well as live action footage shot at various locations, to reconstruct prehistoric life and environments. Owing to being the latest installment, the CGI in Walking with Monsters is more sophisticated, which also contributed to a heavier reliance on CGI than animatronics than in previous series. In total, over 600 scientists were consulted for advice during the production of Walking with Monsters.

Although Walking with Monsters attracted the least viewers out of any Walking with... series during its original airing and received more mixed reviews, the series won an Emmy Award for Outstanding Animated Program (For Programming One Hour or More). It was also nominated for a BAFTA TV Award for Best Visual Effects. Walking with Monsters was for some broadcasts (including its first) also edited together as a single 90-minute documentary film.

== Premise ==
Set from the Cambrian (543 million years ago) to the early Triassic (248 million years ago), Walking with Monsters explores the prehistoric life of the Palaeozoic era. The series focuses on "the struggle for the survival of the fittest", using stories of individual animals to cast the Palaeozoic as a long "war" between "monsters" -various animal groups- for dominance, some of which are described within the context of the series as being distantly related to humans, to the point that some new evolutionary features are described as being inherited by humanity much later.

Walking with Monsters is the final installment in the Walking with... series of nature documentaries and serves as a prequel of sorts to the original series Walking with Dinosaurs (1999).

== Production ==
As for previous series in the Walking with... franchise, the computer graphics of Walking with Monsters were created by the visual effects company Framestore. Walking with Monsters employed the most sophisticated CGI in the entire franchise, featuring 29 different creatures (more than in previous series) in almost 600 VFX shots. Though close-up shots in previous series had often been made with animatronics, more such shots were made with CGI in Walking with Monsters owing to the extent to which computer graphics had improved by 2005. Models of animals were first made physically, based on fossil evidence, before being scanned and animated.

Unlike the creatures featured in previous series, the animals in Walking with Monsters were much less familiar to wider audiences and, according to producer and director Chloe Leland, more "fantastical". The production team feared that this would make the creatures more difficult to believe in. To remedy this issue, the production team used various techniques, including adding numerous shots of the creatures interacting with the camera (such as a Brontoscorpio shattering a camera lens) and using night vision in certain scenes to increase the sense of realism.

Walking with Monsters took two years to make and cost £3 million. The series was shot in Super 16 and filmed over a 12-month period. Filming locations included Arizona, Florida and the Canary Islands. Some detail shots of elements such as burrows, eggs and dead trees were built and shot in the studio.

The production of Walking with Monsters was envisioned as finishing the story of prehistoric life began with Walking with Dinosaurs in 1999 and continued in Walking with Beasts in 2001. Dinosaurs focused on the Mesozoic and Beasts focused on the Cenozoic, which meant that Monsters completed the so-called "Trilogy of Life". According to behind-the-scenes material from Walking with Monsters, all three series together cost a total of £15 million to make.

== Episodes ==
No.	Title	Time period	Directed by	Original release date	U.K. viewers (millions)
–	"Walking with Monsters"	530–248 mya	Chloe Leland	5 November 2005	Unknown
Omnibus of all three episodes.
1	"N/A"	530/418/360 mya	Chloe Leland	8 December 2005	4.57
The first episode deals with early life in the water; after a depiction of the giant impact hypothesis and the formation of the Moon, the episode forwards to the Cambrian period. The Cambrian segment showcases strange early arthropods, such as the super-predator Anomalocaris, and Haikouichthys, described as the first vertebrate. In the subsequent Silurian segment, the episode follows the jawless fish Cephalaspis, which is hunted by the giant marine scorpion Brontoscorpio, who, in turn, falls victim to the giant eurypterid, Pterygotus. The final segment of the episode, set in the Devonian period, follows the amphibian-like tetrapod Hynerpeton. Although arthropods have by this point shrunk in size, Hynerpeton are instead preyed upon by large predatory fish, such as the shark-like Stethacanthus and the two-ton giant Hyneria.
2	"N/A"	300/280 mya	Chloe Leland	15 December 2005	N/A (<4.24) (Note: Not reported in the weekly top 15 programmes for four-screen viewer ratings.)
The second episode begins in the coal forests of the Carboniferous, where high oxygen content in the atmosphere has allowed arthropods to once more reach giant sizes. Giant arthropods include the dragonfly Meganeura, millipede Arthropleura and a giant spider from the Mesothelae suborder. (Note: The spider featured in the programme does not correspond to any real fossil species. The production team had intended for it to represent Megarachne, which was originally described as a giant spider but was during the production of the series reclassified as a eurypterid. The Mesothelae spider in Walking with Monsters closely follows what Megarachne was thought to have looked like before it was reclassified.) The coal forest is also inhabited by the early reptile Petrolacosaurus, one of the few creatures that end up surviving a catastrophic forest fire. The second segment of the episode is set in the Early Permian, with reptiles now being the dominant group of land animals. The episode follows two different species of pelycosaur, the herbivorous Edaphosaurus and carnivorous Dimetrodon, particularly following a lone Dimetrodon mother guarding her nest.
3	"N/A"	250/248 mya	Tim Haines	19 December 2005	N/A (<4.23)
The third episode begins in the Late Permian, on the supercontinent Pangaea, covered by a vast and inhospitable desert. The first segment follows the life around a shrinking waterhole and the animals living in its surroundings. These include the pareiasaur Scutosaurus, dicynodont Diictodon and large gorgonopsians. A Scutosaurus herd drinking the waterhole dry and a large sandstorm wipes out most of the animals, the Diictodons being among the few survivors. The second segment of the episode is set in the Early Triassic and follows the larger dicynodonts Lystrosaurus on a large migration. The herd is during its migration threatened by predators such as therocephalians and chasmatosaurs. The episode also features Euparkeria, an early forerunner of the dinosaurs.

== Reception ==
Walking with Monsters was the least viewed series in the Walking with... franchise during its original airing, its first episode attracting only 4.57 million viewers. By comparison, Walking with Beasts had 8 million viewers and Walking with Dinosaurs reached 15 million.

=== Reviews ===
Nathan Southern gave Walking with Monsters a positive review in The New York Times, writing that the programme was likely to "[entertain] young viewers while encouraging them to think about prehistory". Ian Johns gave Walking with Monsters a negative review in The Times, criticizing its "over-insistence that every creature was locked [...] in a ruthless battle to rule the Earth" and also thought that it had lost the "wow factor" of its predecessors. A. A. Gill, also writing for The Times, also reviewed Walking with Monsters negatively, writing that it was full of "small mouthfuls of ghoulish factoids and gory suppositions", that the "monsters look like prototypes for toy manufacturers and computer games" and that the programme seemed to be aimed at "nine-year-old American boys" rather than mature British audiences.

=== Awards ===
In 2006, Walking with Monsters won an Emmy Award for Outstanding Animated Program (For Programming One Hour or More) and was also nominated for a BAFTA TV Award for Best Visual Effects.

== In other media ==
=== Encyclopedia ===
Unlike previous Walking with... series, Walking with Monsters was not accompanied with the publication of a companion book. Instead, the book The Complete Guide to Prehistoric Life was published in October 2005 to coincide with the series. Written by Paul Chambers and executive producer Tim Haines, the book is an encyclopedia and reference work, pulling together images from Walking with Monsters, Walking with Dinosaurs (including its specials), Walking with Beasts and Sea Monsters (2003) and pairing them with scientific information on the species depicted.
