= Land of Giants / The Giant Claw =

2002 British television documentary programmes

- Cover of the original UK DVD release
- Also known as: Chased by Dinosaurs
- Genre: Nature documentary
- Created by: Tim Haines
- Directed by: Tim Haines; Jasper James
- Presented by: Nigel Marven
- Composer: Ben Bartlett
- Country of origin: United Kingdom
- Original language: English
- No. of episodes: 2

Production
- Executive producers: Tim Haines; Gaynelle Evans; Adam Kemp
- Producer: Jasper James
- Cinematography: John Howarth; Peter Thorn; Paul Jenkins; Claire Allistone
- Editors: Andrew Wilks; Tom Parker
- Running time: 30 minutes
- Production companies: BBC Studios Science Unit; Impossible Pictures

Original release
- Network: BBC, Discovery Channel, ProSieben
- Release: 30 December 2002 – 1 January 2003

Land of Giants and The Giant Claw, (Note: Full titles: Land of Giants: A Walking with Dinosaurs Special and The Giant Claw: A Walking with Dinosaurs Special) marketed together as Chased by Dinosaurs in the United States, are two special episodes of the nature documentary television series Walking with Dinosaurs. Created by Impossible Pictures and produced by the BBC Studios Science Unit, the Discovery Channel and ProSieben, The Giant Claw was first broadcast on 30 December 2002, followed by Land of Giants on 1 January 2003. The two episodes star British wildlife presenter Nigel Marven as a "time-travelling zoologist", interacting with dinosaurs and other prehistoric creatures, a drastic change in presentation from preceding entries in the Walking with... franchise.

As with previous documentaries in the Walking with... franchise, Land of Giants and The Giant Claw recreated extinct animals through a combination of computer-generated imagery and animatronics, incorporated into live action footage shot at various locations. The choice to include a presenter was made to more easily allow audiences to see the scale of the creatures shown in the episodes. Both episodes have Marven on a purposeful journey; in The Giant Claw, Marven searches for the long-clawed Therizinosaurus and in Land of Giants he searches for the enormous Argentinosaurus and Giganotosaurus.

The visual effects of the episodes were praised, with both episodes together winning the Emmy for Outstanding Animated Programme in 2004 and The Giant Claw winning a BAFTA TV Award for Best Visual Effects in 2003. The success of Land of Giants and The Giant Claw spawned further prehistoric miniseries starring Marven: Sea Monsters (2003) and Prehistoric Park (2006). For his role as the presenter of Land of Giants and Sea Monsters, Marven was nominated for a Royal Television Society Programme award.

== Premise ==
Land of Giants and The Giant Claw sees time-travelling zoologist Nigel Marven travel back in time to encounter and interact with prehistoric life. Marven seeks to solve palaeontological mysteries through direct observation. In The Giant Claw he searches for the obscure dinosaur Therizinosaurus. Because of its giant claws, Marven mistakenly initially believes it to have been an enormous carnivore. In the Land of Giants, Marven seeks to track down Argentinosaurus, one of the largest dinosaurs to ever live, and observe how they were hunted by the giant predatory dinosaur Giganotosaurus.

== Production ==
Land of Giants and The Giant Claw were created by Impossible Pictures, creators of the original 1999 series of Walking with Dinosaurs. The same technologies used to restore the animals in the previous series were used to reconstruct the prehistoric creatures and environments showcased in the specials, with computer-generated animals and animatronics being used for the animals and background footage being shot in real natural environments. The visual effects were created by visual effects company Framestore, which had also worked on previous installments in the Walking with... franchise, including the original Walking with Dinosaurs.

Because grass had not yet evolved in the Cretaceous, the location team had to look for filming sites where there was no grass. Filming locations included Fraser Island in Australia and Tenerife (including the lava-covered slopes of Mount Teide, prominently figuring in Land of Giants) in the Canary Islands.

The decision to include a wildlife presenter, The Giant Claw being the first time a wildlife presenter had ever been depicted interacting with computer-generated dinosaurs, was made to more easily allow the audience to see the true scale of the creatures shown in the programme. Tim Haines, the creator of Walking with Dinosaurs, had seen Nigel Marven's work with modern-day reptiles and approached him about the possibility of producing a programme in which Marven travelled back in time to meet dinosaurs, a prospect which Marven was enthusiastic about. Haines and Marven first discussed the prospect of producing the specials on 11 September 2001, the meeting being held at the exact same time as the September 11 attacks in New York.

In one segment of The Giant Claw, Marven is chased by velociraptors and has to climb up a tree to escape. While climbing, Marven accidentally put his finger under a vine before stepping on it, which led to one of his fingernails being pulled off. In order to protect himself from infection, Marven then had to wear a bandage on his finger. The bandage and injury was incorporated into the story of the episode, with a Mononykus being depicted as biting Marven's finger.

== Episodes ==
No.	Title	Time period	Directed by	Original release date	U.K. viewers (millions)
1	"The Giant Claw"	Late Cretaceous, 75 mya	Tim Haines	30 December 2002	6.83
Nigel searches the deserts and forests of Cretaceous Mongolia for Therizinosaurus, an obscure dinosaur with massive fossil claws, believing it to have been a huge carnivore. Throughout his journey, Marven comes face-to-face with dinosaurs such as Saurolophus, Protoceratops, Mononykus, Velociraptor and Tarbosaurus, a close relative of the famous Tyrannosaurus rex. Once Marven finds live Therizinosaurus he discovers them to have been a bizarre type of giant plant-eating theropod dinosaur.
2	"Land of Giants"	Middle Cretaceous, 100 mya	Jasper James	1 January 2003	5.76
In Middle Cretaceous Argentina, Marven searches for the largest dinosaurs of all time. He encounters a herd of Argentinosaurus, one of the largest sauropod dinosaurs, and observes the long and drawn-out hunt of the sauropods by one of the largest predatory dinosaurs, Giganotosaurus. During his journey, Marven also uses a small plane to fly with pterosaurs such as Pteranodon and Ornithocheirus, and he also encounters the massive crocodyliform Sarcosuchus.

== Reception ==
=== Reviews ===
Paul Hoggart gave Land of Giants and The Giant Claw a positive review in The Times, calling them "stunningly animated". The episodes was also positively reviewed in the Sunday Express. The Sunday Express review called them "beautifully produced" with "breathtaking" animation and also called Marven's performance "incredible convincing" and worthy of an Oscar.

=== Awards ===
In 2003, The Giant Claw won a BAFTA TV Award for Best Visual Effects. In 2004, The Giant Claw and Land of Giants won the Emmy for Outstanding Animated Programme. For his work in Land of Giants and in the subsequent miniseries Sea Monsters, also part of the Walking with... series and produced by Impossible Pictures, Nigel Marven was nominated for a Royal Television Society Programme award in 2004 for best presenter (factual).

== Successor series ==
Following Marven's work on The Giant Claw and Land of Giants, he was approached by Jasper James, producer of both episodes and director of Land of Giants, about the prospect of producing a standalone series where Marven travelled to different prehistoric seas and swam with ancient sea creatures. Marven was enthusiastic and agreed to partake in the project. The series, titled Sea Monsters, was announced by the BBC on 29 July 2003 and first aired in November the same year.

In addition to Sea Monsters, both Marven and James returned to prehistory with the series Prehistoric Park, also created by Impossible Pictures. Prehistoric Park is unconnected to the Walking with... series and was produced by ITV, ProSieben, Animal Planet and M6. Marven starred in the series and James served as executive producer. Prehistoric Park took a year to film and first aired in July–August 2006. It is today considered a cult classic.
