= Walking with Dinosaurs (2025 TV series) =

2025 British television documentary series

- Cover of the 2025 British DVD release
- Genre: Nature documentary
- Created by: Kirsty Wilson
- Directed by: Tom Hewitson; Stephen Cooter; Owen Gower
- Narrated by: Bertie Carvel
- Composer: Ty Unwin
- Country of origin: United Kingdom
- Original language: English
- No. of episodes: 6

Production
- Executive producers: Helen Thomas; Andrew Cohen
- Producers: Tom Hewitson; Natalie Coles; Stephen Cooter; Mairead Maclean; Owen Gower
- Cinematography: Patrick Acum; Jonathan Jones; Neil Harvey; Julius Brighton; Tom Hayward; Paul Williams; Ben Sherlock
- Editors: Ben Lavington Martin; Tom Kelpie; Ged Murphy; Gary McMath
- Running time: 48–49 minutes
- Production companies: BBC Science Unit; PBS

Original release
- Network: BBC One
- Release: 25 May – 29 June 2025

Walking with Dinosaurs is a 2025 six-part nature documentary television miniseries produced by the BBC Studios Science Unit and PBS in association with ZDF and France Télévisions. It is marketed as a revival of the original 1999 Walking with Dinosaurs miniseries, though without any returning crew members from the 1999 series. Each episode delves into a particular individual dinosaur discovered at an active dig site. The story of each protagonist dinosaur is assembled through paleontological work in the field as well as scenes of computer-generated imagery in live action environments.

In the United Kingdom, BBC One began airing the series on 25 May 2025, with the remaining episodes streamed on BBC iPlayer on the same day. In the United States, PBS began airing the series as a three-day event starting 16 June 2025. The series also released on ABC TV and ABC iview in Australia and iQIYI in China. The series was praised for its scientific accuracy, but received generally mixed reviews for its presentation.

== Production and marketing ==
The new Walking with Dinosaurs series was announced on 4 June 2024, as a co-production between BBC and PBS, along with ZDF and France Télévisions. The series is narrated by Bertie Carvel, with Andrew Cohen and Helen Thomas as executive producers, Kirsty Wilson as showrunner, and Stephen Cooter, Tom Hewitson, and Owen Gower as producer/directors. One of the consulting paleontologists, Nizar Ibrahim, revealed that the series was in part built around the premise to create a documentary featuring Spinosaurus. Over 200 paleontologists were consulted during the series' production.

The original announcement mentioned Spinosaurus, Triceratops, Tyrannosaurus, and Lusotitan as particular dinosaurs of emphasis. Promotional images were first revealed for the new series on 22 January 2025, indicating that Pachyrhinosaurus and Albertosaurus would feature as well. BBC released a full trailer on 10 April 2025. A companion book for the series, written by Andrew Cohen, Helen Thomas, and Kirsty Wilson, was released by DK in June 2025.

A 70-minute program called "Walking with Dinosaurs: Prologue", a production collaboration by the BBC and NHK, aired on August 8 in Japan. The program showed highlights of the documentary series, aired starting on August 10. It had Masaki Aiba (Arashi) as navigator, with Yuna Furukawa (Yuchami), Manabe Makoto (Honorary Researcher at the National Museum of Nature and Science), and Tomomi Hirose (NHK Announcer) as participants. The National Museum of Nature and Science in Ueno, Tokyo, was used as a studio.

== Episodes ==
| No. | Title | Time period and location | Directed by | U.K. broadcast date | U.K. viewers (millions) |
|---|---|---|---|---|---|
| 1 | "The Orphan" | Montana, 66 Ma (Late Cretaceous) | Tom Hewitson | 25 May 2025 | 2.99 |
A baby female Triceratops, nicknamed Clover, wanders alone in prehistoric Laramidia. She encounters a nest-guarding female Infernodrakon who is eaten by a Tyrannosaurus. Clover manages to evade the Tyrannosaurus during the night and takes a nap alongside an Edmontosaurus herd on the following day, but she later leaves the herd after the Tyrannosaurus manages to kill a juvenile Edmontosaurus. She also repeatedly encounters an adult male Triceratops, who ultimately defeats the Tyrannosaurus.
| 2 | "The River Dragon" | Morocco, 100 Ma (Late Cretaceous) | Stephen Cooter | 1 June 2025 | 2.47 |
A young male Spinosaurus, nicknamed Sobek, is portrayed as a father leading his four offspring in search of food. Sobek stumbles upon a giant titanosaur carcass but is driven off by a Carcharodontosaurus who lays claim, and his family journeys towards the spawning pool of the sawskate Onchopristis. Although an Alanqa kills one of his offspring, Sobek successfully hunts the Onchopristis. After fighting off another Spinosaurus who tries to seize the kill, Sobek provides food for his offspring but dies of his injuries.
| 3 | "Band of Brothers" | Utah, 130 Ma (Early Cretaceous) | Stephen Cooter | 8 June 2025 | 2.54 |
A young male Gastonia, nicknamed George, joins a gang of other young males as protection against a Utahraptor pack. The Utahraptor pack, consisting of an adult male and three juveniles, kills one of the young males and attempts to hunt George, but he survives after the Utahraptor pack changes their target to the nearby Planicoxa. Upon reaching adulthood, the Gastonia gang manages to kill the leading male Utahraptor, but a forest fire engulfs the forest. The surviving Utahraptor group become mired in quicksand while the Gastonia succumb to asphyxiation.
| 4 | "The Pack" | Western Canada, 71 Ma (Late Cretaceous) | Tom Hewitson | 15 June 2025 | N/A (<2.11) (Note: Not reported in the weekly top 50 programmes.) |
A teenaged female Albertosaurus, nicknamed Rose, is forced to find an alternative source of food after a failed hunt against Arrhinoceratops and the late arrival of a migrating Edmontosaurus herd. Rose and her mate attempt to hunt a Cryodrakon without their pack, to the chagrin of the leading female Albertosaurus. On the following day, Rose's mate dies during the hunt after running into the Edmontosaurus stampede. For the next hunt, Rose manages to drive the old male Edmontosaurus to the leading female Albertosaurus, who kills her prey and shares it with Rose.
| 5 | "The Journey North" | Canada, 73 Ma (Late Cretaceous) | Owen Gower | 22 June 2025 | 2.33 |
Multiple herds of Pachyrhinosaurus migrate northward, leading to a confrontation in which an infant male, nicknamed Albie, is separated from his mother. During their migration, the herd faces an azhdarchid pterosaur, freak weather events, and a pack of Gorgosaurus who hunt the nearby Edmontosaurus and later attempt to kill Albie. The majority of the Pachyrhinosaurus herd, including Albie and his mother, succumb to a flash flood, but the surviving members reach their destination.
| 6 | "Island of Giants" | Portugal, 150 Ma (Late Jurassic) | Owen Gower | 29 June 2025 | N/A (<1.99) |
The largest known male Lusotitan, nicknamed Old Grande, finds a female but loses a fight against a younger rival male. He feeds on the bones of a beached pliosaur carcass and rests on the shore until his leg injury heals. Though pressured by a female Torvosaurus during his recuperation, Old Grande manages to recover and wins during his rematch against the rival male. In the end, Old Grande mates with the female after a successful courtship display.

== Reception ==
The 2025 series received generally mixed reviews. Critics agreed that the CGI was an improvement over the original series, though it fell short of the photorealistic style accomplished by Prehistoric Planet (2022–2023). Several reviewers were distracted by the usage of anthropomorphism in the dinosaur-centred storylines. Jack Seale of The Guardian described the paleontologist-based segments as "painstaking to the point of tedium". Conversely, Carol Midgley of The Times "found the sequences of the actual digs some of the most interesting parts", and Dan Einav of Financial Times stated that "[the] on-site segments are a joy to watch".

British paleontologist James Ronan praised the scientific accuracy, general behavioural depictions and incorporation of fieldwork segments, but expressed criticism on certain exaggerations and a lack of behavioral variety compared to the original series. He stated that the series felt more like a "dramatized re-enactment of possible scenarios" rather than observations of the dinosaurs in their natural habitat. He also noted minor graphical shortcomings and animation inconsistencies.
