= Jasper James =

British television producer, director and screenwriter

Jasper James is a British television producer, director and screenwriter. He is well known as the co-creator of several of the Walking with... series.

== Work ==
- Tomorrow's World (1993) - director
- Future Fantastic (1996) - producer
- Walking with Dinosaurs (1999) - producer, director
- The Making of Walking with Dinosaurs (1999) - producer, director
- Walking with Beasts (2001) - series producer
- Walking with Beasts Special: Triumph of the Beasts (2001) - producer
- Walking with Beasts Special: The Beast Within (2001) - writer, producer
- Chased by Dinosaurs (2002) - producer, writer, director of Land of Giants episode
- Sea Monsters (2003) - director
- The Story of 1 (2005) - executive producer
- T-Rex: A Dinosaur in Hollywood (2005) - executive producer
- Perfect Disaster (2006) - executive producer
- Prehistoric Park (2006) - executive producer
- March of the Dinosaurs (2011) - writer, executive producer
- Titanoboa: Monster Snake (2012) - executive producer
- Information Age (2014) - writer, executive producer
- Size Matters (2018) - executive producer
- Hey You! What If? (2020) - executive producer

== Bibliography ==
- Chased by Sea Monsters by Nigel Marven and Jasper James, DK ADULT, 2004, ISBN 978-0-7566-0375-5
- Prehistoric Park with Poster adapted by Susan Evento, created by Jasper James, Meredith Books, 2007, ISBN 978-0-696-23691-4
