= March of the Dinosaurs =

- Written by: Matthew Thompson; Jasper James
- Directed by: Matthew Thompson
- Narrated by: Stephen Fry; Simon Kerr
- Music by: Mark Russell
- Countries of origin: United Kingdom; Canada
- Original language: English

Production
- Producer: Mike Davis
- Editor: Matt Platts-Mills
- Running time: 85 minutes
- Production company: Wide-Eyed Entertainment

Original release
- Network: ITV1
- Release: 23 April 2011

March of the Dinosaurs is a CGI film which has aired on ITV 1 in the UK on 23 April 2011 and was released on DVD on 27 May 2011. The film was produced by Wide-Eyed Entertainment in association with Yap Films, and executive produced by Jasper James, who had previously worked on the Walking with... series and Prehistoric Park. Set 70 million years ago in the Cretaceous in North America, the film follows the journey of a young Edmontosaurus named Scar and his herd as they migrate from Northern Alaska to Alberta during the winter. This film depicts recent findings and speculation about dinosaurs, such as North-American Tyrannosaurs having feathers, and hunting in packs, dinosaurs in the snow and migrating.

It shows a 1000-mile autumn migration of Edmontosaurus and Pachyrhinosaurus from their summer grazing in northwest Canada (then well inside the Arctic Circle, so that the winter night and summer day were each 4 months long) to their winter grazing in the south-west USA, and the young Alaskan Troodon which had to stay and endure the Arctic winter. The hazards met are land and water predators, an Arctic blizzard, thin ice, crossing a foodless volcanic wasteland, a lahar, and a wide river inhabited by predators. All the scenery and vegetation are CGI. It served as a reimagining of the comic book series Age of Reptiles.

The DVD says that this is inspired by recent dinosaur fossil discoveries in the Canadian Arctic, and that the Arctic CGI trees are modelled on Sequioa.

== Plot ==
The film begins on a summer's day in Northern Alaska, 70 million years ago, and a herd of Edmontosaurus and a spiky Edmontonia (identified as Ankylosaur) are feeding on the lush vegetation that grows all around them. Scar, a young male Edmontosaurus, enjoys his life in the Arctic forests with his extended family, and comes across a young male Alaskan Troodon named Patch, who has been feasting on baby Edmontosaurus all summer, but now has to chase smaller, more difficult prey as the babies are too large now. He chases after an Alphadon, but another Troodon grabs the fleeing mammal, and Patch is becoming impatient. The plentiful food for Scar is ending as well, as the dark, cold Arctic winter is approaching. When night falls for the first time, Scar loses sign of the herd and spots a dark shape, which turns out to be a Gorgosaurus, which slices his face as he narrowly dodges the killer blow. Later, a herd of Pachyrhinosaurus arrives and starts to compete for the dwindling food supply, further pressuring the herd's search for food. Scar finds the Edmontonia, his old friend, feasting on rotten wood and insect larvae from a fallen tree branch and tries his luck with mixed success. The sun sets and the Pachyrhinosaurus herd moves on somewhere else in search of food. The winter's approach causes the herbivores to start risking their safety and a young female Edmontosaurus gets killed by the Gorgosaurus as she wanders too far from the herd.

The next day, the Edmontosaurus and Pachyrhinosaurus herds join forces and move south for the winter towards Alberta, while the Edmontonia stays behind due to her heavy armor. She has also been storing fat to last her through the long lean months of cold. Meanwhile, Patch and the Troodons are feasting on the dead male Edmontosaurus when the Gorgosaurus appears. The tyrannosaur scares the troodontids away, but is wounded in the fight, and Patch is frustrated and must work harder to find prey. Far away, the dinosaur herd is moving on, until a blizzard arrives and Scar collapses, but an older male arrives and helps him to keep moving through the blizzard. They continue on walking and don't realize they are heading into a trap; the ground breaks apart, as they walked onto a frozen sea inlet. As the herd struggles to escape the icy water, several get dragged under by mosasaurs known as Prognathodon. Scar has never swum before, but he is pushed in and starts to swim for the shore. Back in Alaska, Patch picks up a bone and heads back to his nest, which he has been building in the hopes of attracting a mate. Nearby, The Gorgosaurus finds the Edmontonia outside his lair, but the bite on his leg from his fight with the Troodons is badly infected, and so, he goes back into his cave to wait for easier prey to wander close.

Six hundred miles away, the Edmontosaurus herd moves on through a volcanic ash field. Scar then sees a dark shadows, which turns out to be a flock of scavenging Quetzalcoatlus, which feed on the dying herd members that could not keep pace. Lying in wait, a pack of Albertosaurus sleeps until the herd is close enough to ambush. The feathered carnivores wake up and start to stalk the herd. Scar runs for his life while one of the predators is hot on his heels. During the attack, an avalanche of water, rock and mud caused by the eruption of a volcano that follows the attack slides down the bank. Scar tries to climb up the side of the bank, but loses his grip and slides back down every time, and the Albertosaurus, injured in the eruption, begins to close in. Just as Scar sees the avalanche, he rushes up the bank side, while the Albertosaurus is swept away to its supposed death. Back in the Arctic, Patch tries to impress the female by dancing only to lose out to a more experienced male and the Edmontonia has found a last leaf. Suddenly, the log she stands on breaks apart and the Edmontonia slides down the snow-covered slope on her back and is utterly helpless. Far away south, Scar tries to call for his family, but the only calls are the ones that didn't make it; the old male Edmontosaurus he had been traveling with, and an injured female Pachyrhinosaurus. The Albertosaurus, having survived the mudslide, rises back to its feet and starting following Scar's trail again. Scar and the old Edmontosaurus walks on, but the older animal, suffering from a brain tumor, becomes more aggressive and nervous towards Scar, eventually even biting him. Scar sees the Albertosaurus first, and flees. The old bull Edmontosaurus fights the predator until they both tumble over a cliff, locked in a deadly embrace, leaving Scar on his own, once again.

In the frozen north, Patch learns how to finally catch Alphadons by listening for them under the snow and comes across the overturned Edmontonia. He and several other Troodons attack the ankylosaur, but the Gorgosaurus, now fully healed of its injury, arrives and pulls the herbivore away from the smaller predators. Struggling, the Edmontonia gets back up and injures the Gorgosaurus with her shoulder spikes. The Gorgosaurus heads back to its cave, fatally wounded with a broken leg. As the sun rises the next morning, Scar is becoming weaker and the Quetzalcoatlus that follows senses it. The young dinosaur hears a rustling noise, which turns to be the injured female Pachyrhinosaurus instead. The pterosaur gives up as the ceratopsian herd arrives to cross the river. Scar informs his new companions that he has been through this exact same kind of experience before back up north. As they begin to cross the river, groups of Prognathodon arrive and pull many of them underwater. Scar dives in while the mosasaurs continue their attack on the Pachyrhinosauruses. Scar eventually reaches the far bank and reunites with the Edmontosaurus herd, finally reaching safety. The sun eventually rises again and warmth begins to spread across the Arctic Circle. The Edmontonia is feasting on the budding greens and Patch manages to find a mate, offering scavenged meat from the dead Gorgosaurus. Soon, the Edmontosaurus will travel north again once summer begins to arrive to the north.

== Animals ==
- Albertosaurus
- Alphadon
- Edmontonia
- Edmontosaurus
- Gorgosaurus
- Pachyrhinosaurus
- Prognathodon
- Quetzalcoatlus
- Troodon (Alaskan Species)
