= Rafi the Wishing Wizard =

British animated television series

- Genre: Fantasy; Adventure; Sitcom; Preschool
- Created by: Tom Cousins
- Written by: Tony Cooke; Jen Upton; Emma Hogan; Sarah Campbell; Mariama Ives-Moiba; Davey Moore; Tim Bain; Andrew Emerson; Miranda Walker; Athena Kugblenu; Tasha Dhanraj; Ashley Joseph; Lissi Simpson-Watt; Rose Johnson; Camille Ucan; Sam Barlow; Simon Nicholson; Hannah George
- Directed by: Seán McCormack
- Voices of: Mollie Hutton; Kieron Richardson; Muzz Khan; Darcy Shaw; Jake Ademola; Mina Anwar; Julie Hesmondhalgh; Karis Musongole; Jennie McAlpine
- Composers: Kyle Riabko and Steph Mckeon
- Country of origin: United Kingdom
- Original language: English
- No. of seasons: 1
- No. of episodes: 53 (2 coming soon due to being holiday related)

Production
- Executive producer: Tom Cousins
- Producers: Helen Burt; Mel Taylor
- Running time: 7 minutes
- Production companies: BBC Studios Kids & Family Productions; Blue Zoo Animation Studio

Original release
- Network: CBeebies; BBC iPlayer
- Release: 16 February 2026 – present

Rafi the Wishing Wizard is a British children's animated television series created by Tom Cousins and produced by BBC Studios Kids & Family Productions.

== Premise ==
The series follows seven-year-old Rafi Martin, a Wishing Wizard who lives in Manchester with her two dads. Using her magic wishing wand, Rafi can make one temporary wish each day, turning ordinary childhood moments into funny and surprising adventures for Rafi, her family and friends.

== Characters ==
- Mollie Hutton as Rafi Martin
- Kieron Richardson as Jake Martin
- Muzz Khan as Dash Martin
- Darcy Shaw as Ruby
- Jake Ademola as Finn
- Mina Anwar as Aunty T
- Julie Hesmondhalgh as Doris
- Karis Musongole as Khia
- Jennie McAlpine as Amy

== Production ==
Rafi the Wishing Wizard was created by Tom Cousins and commissioned by BBC Children's and Education for CBeebies in 2023. The series was produced by BBC Studios Kids & Family Productions, with animation services provided by Blue Zoo Animation Studio. Tony Cooke served as head writer, while Sean McCormack directed all episodes.

In interviews with Prolific North and Animation Magazine, Cousins described Rafi the Wishing Wizard as "a classic family sitcom, driven by magic, surprise and plenty of heart". He said the series was inspired by stories in which the extraordinary exists within recognisable everyday settings. Describing the show's creative approach, he said "the wishes are the only overtly fantastical element", adding that "the real magic is the family dynamic". Cousins said Manchester was chosen as the setting to encourage children to imagine magical events unfolding in places they recognise, such as "zooming to school on a waterslide or meeting a friendly dinosaur in their local museum". He added that the series was designed around the idea that "the more real the world felt, the more fantastical the magic would seem".

== Reception ==
Writing for Skwigly, Simmon Keith Barney stated the show had "a stellar cast of voice actors", and gave it a positive reaction, saying: "Rafi the Wishing Wizard is a warm and funny celebration of family, friendship and the unpredictable power of a well-timed wish."

Rahmin Zahed of Animation Magazine deemed that Rafi the Wishing Wizard introduced viewers to a "magical version of modern-day Manchester", adding that the "colorful comedy also packs in a lot of heart with the relationship between Rafi and her two loving dads (Hollyoaks‘ Kieron Richardson and Wallace & Gromit: Vengeance Most Fowl voicer Muzz Khan), as well as local flavor and universal themes of friendship and community."

Praising the series for being "packed with comedy" and "casting a spell on our hearts", the Capital Pride London blog stated that "the show’s real charm lies in its beautiful representation of modern life".

Manchester-based The Manc called Rafi the Wishing Wizard "adorable", positively reacting to the way the show "takes life’s ordinary moments and turns them into something extraordinary." Writer Emily Sergeant also felt the seven-minute episodes were "ideal for younger attention spans and easier to spot all of the Manchester landmarks".

== Cultural significance ==
In 2026, the BBC included Rafi the Wishing Wizard in its official LGBT+ Timeline, which documents milestones in LGBTQ+ representation across the broadcaster's history. The timeline highlighted the series' portrayal of Rafi and her two fathers as part of the BBC's chronology of LGBTQ+ representation across its programming.

The series was also featured in the BBC Group Annual Report and Accounts 2025–2026 as an example of culturally relevant children's content and home-grown storytelling. The report highlighted the programme's contemporary setting and its portrayal of modern British family life.

== Episodes ==
=== Season 1 (2026) ===
No.	Title	Written by	Original release date
1	"The First Wish"	Tony Cooke	February 16, 2026
2	"The Bouncy Wish"	Tony Cooke & Tasha Dhanraj	February 16, 2026
3	"The Football Wish"	Hannah George	February 17, 2026
4	"The Gingerbread Wish"	Mariama Ives-Moiba	February 18, 2026
5	"The Bedtime Wish"	Andrew Emerson	February 19, 2026
6	"The Cherry Tree Wish"	Athena Kugblenu	February 20, 2026
7	"The Mermaid Wish"	Mariama Ives-Moiba	February 23, 2026
8	"The Baby Wish"	Tony Cooke & Tim Bain	February 24, 2026
9	"The Stuck Together Wish"	Jen Upton	February 25, 2026
10	"The Do-It-All Wish"	Tony Cooke & Ashley Joseph	February 26, 2026
11	"The Tallest Wish"	Mariama Ives-Moiba	February 27, 2026
12	"The Cat Wish"	Sarah Campbell	March 2, 2026
13	"The Unicorn Wish"	Tony Cooke & Tim Bain	March 3, 2026
14	"The Talk to Animals Wish"	Jen Upton	March 4, 2026
15	"The Multi Rafi Wish"	Jen Upton	March 5, 2026
16	"The Playground Wish"	Emma Hogan	March 6, 2026
17	"The Freeze Wish"	Davey Moore	March 9, 2026
18	"The Switch Places Wish"	Sarah Campbell	March 10, 2026
19	"The Basketball Wish"	Emma Hogan	March 11, 2026
20	"The Bubble Wish"	Tony Cooke & Mariama Ives-Moiba	March 12, 2026
21	"The Fixie Pixie Wish"	Sarah Campbell	March 13, 2026
22	"The Lost and Found Wish"	Rose Johnson & Camille Ucan	March 16, 2026
23	"The Magic Show Wish"	Tony Cooke & Tim Bain	March 17, 2026
24	"The Dinosaur Wish"	Tony Cooke	March 18, 2026
25	"The Driving Wish"	Tony Cooke	March 19, 2026
26	"The Camping Wish"	Jen Upton	March 20, 2026
27	"The Best Wish"	Tony Cooke	September 14, 2026
28	"The Walk To School Wish"	Tony Cooke and Tim Bain	September 14, 2026
29	"The Blueberry Jam Wish"	Miranda Walker	September 15, 2026
30	"The Superhero Wish"	Davey Moore	September 16, 2026
31	"The Dancing Wish"	Andrew Emerson	September 17, 2026
32	"The Big Baby Wish"	Sarah Campbell	September 18, 2026
33	"The Suitcase Wish"	Tony Cooke	September 21, 2026
34	"The Lights Out Wish"	Andrew Emerson	September 22, 2026
35	"The Puppy Wish"	Lissi Simpson-Watt	September 23, 2026
36	"The Pirate Wish"	Davey Moore	September 24, 2026
37	"The Dragon Wish"	Tony Cooke	September 25, 2026
38	"The Escalator Wish"	Jen Upton	September 28, 2026
39	"The Yes Day Wish"	Jen Upton	September 29, 2026
40	"The Rain Wish"	Emma Hogan	September 30, 2026
41	"The Shadow Wish"	Miranda Walker	October 1, 2026
42	"The Guitar Wish"	Jen Upton	October 2, 2026
43	"The Speedy Wish"	Tony Cooke	October 5, 2026
44	"The Toys Wish"	Tony Cooke	October 6, 2026
45	"The Longest Hair Wish"	Sam Barlow	October 7, 2026
46	"The More Than One Wish"	Jen Upton	October 8, 2026
47	"The Teeny Tiny Wish"	Simon Nicholson	October 9, 2026
48	"The Loud Wish"	Tony Cooke	October 12, 2026
49	"The Breakfast Wish"	Tony Cooke	October 13, 2026
50	"The Flying Wish"	Emma Hogan	October 14, 2026
51	"The Halloween Wish"	Emma Hogan	October 30, 2026
52	"The Reindeer Wish"	To Be Announced	December 3, 2026
53	"The Snow Wish"	To Be Announced	December 4, 2026
