= Tim Haines =

British television director and producer

- Education: Bangor University (BA)
- Years active: 1981-present
- Notable work: Walking with Dinosaurs; Chased by Dinosaurs

Tim Haines is a screenwriter, producer, and director who is best known for his work on the BBC popular science shows Walking with Dinosaurs, Walking with Beasts, and Walking with Monsters. He is co-creator and executive producer of the ITV sci-fi drama Primeval, and founder of the production company Impossible Pictures.

Tim Haines graduated from Bangor University in 1981 with a BSc in Applied Zoology, before beginning a career as a journalist, eventually working for the BBC, and becoming a producer. In 2002, Bangor University awarded him an Honorary Fellowship.

He is also an author, and has written and co-written many books relating to the television series.

== Filmography ==
=== Director ===
| Year | Title |
|---|---|
| 1999 | Walking with Dinosaurs |
| 2002 | Chased by Dinosaurs (The Giant Claw) |
| 2005 | Walking with Monsters (episode 3) |

=== Producer ===
| Year | Title |
|---|---|
| 1994-1997 | Horizon (3 episodes) |
| 1998 | Nova (2 episodes) |
| 1999 | Walking With Dinosaurs |
| 2000 | The Ballad of Big Al (Walking with Dinosaurs special) |
| 2001 | Walking with Beasts |
| 2001 | The Lost World |
| 2002 | The Giant Claw (Walking with Dinosaurs special) |
| 2003 | Land of Giants (Walking with Dinosaurs special) |
| 2003 | Sea Monsters |
| 2004 | The Legend of the Tamworth Two (TV movie) |
| 2004 | Space Odyssey: Voyage to the Planets |
| 2005 | Walking with Monsters |
| 2006 | Ocean Odyssey |
| 2007-2011 | Primeval |
| 2009 | Defying Gravity |
| 2009 | Blitz Street |
| 2012 | Sinbad |
| 2012 | Primeval: New World |
| 2016 | Beowulf: Return to the Shieldlands |
| 2017 | The Loch |
| 2026 | Surviving Earth |

== Bibliography ==
- Walking with Dinosaurs: A Natural History (1999), companion book to the series Walking with Dinosaurs
- Walking with Beasts: A Prehistoric Safari (2001), companion book to the series Walking with Beasts
- Space Odyssey: A Voyage to the Planets (2004, with Christopher Riley), companion book to the series Space Odyssey
- The Complete Guide to Prehistoric Life (2005, with Paul Chambers), companion book to the Walking with... franchise
- Cruel Eden (2018), a sequel to Arthur Conan Doyle's The Lost World

== Awards and nominations ==
- BAFTA TV Awards
  - 1999: Walking with Dinosaurs (Won)
- Emmy Award
  - 2007: Ocean Odyssey (Nomination)
  - 2006: Walking with Monsters (Won)
  - 2003: Chased by Dinosaurs (Won)
  - 2002: Walking with Beasts (Won)
  - 2001: The Ballad of Big Al (Won)
  - 2000: Walking with Dinosaurs (Won)
