= Karen Hayley =

British actress and writer

Karen Hayley is a British actress and writer. She has performed with the writers John Cooper Clarke and Suede vocalist Brett Anderson. As a writer, her work has been showcased at the Rotterdam International Poetry Festival (representing Great Britain), and the Netherlands Film Festival, 2004.

As an actress, she has been a member of the BBC Radio Rep Company, appeared in the film An Ideal Husband. She also narrated the programme Sea Monsters. Other television appearances include Bo' Selecta!, A Bear's Tail, The Armstrong and Miller Show, and regular late night appearances and sketches as a presenter for MTV. She has worked on a podcast with John Oliver, and Andy Zaltzman for The Sunday Times. In 2011, Hayley co-starred alongside YouTuber and actor Stuart Ashen in the BBC Online Comedy series Back Space.

She shared a flat with Martin Freeman whilst studying at the Central School of Speech and Drama, and later appeared with him in the short film Hood Felt Hate. She appeared in the Supergrass video for Mary, directed by Sophie Muller.
