= Chloe Leland =

British writer, executive producer and VFX specialist

Chloe Leland is a British writer, director, producer, executive producer and creative director.

She became first notable for playing Emily Lloyd's younger sister in Wish You Were Here in 1987. She later worked for Working Title as a researcher on several productions and as a location scout on the movie Land Girls (1998).

Since that time she has developed, written, produced, directed and shot documentaries and drama for television, including feature docs and series for Netflix, Disney, Discovery Channel, and BBC. She worked as camera operator on Grammy Award-winning Concert for George and wrote, produced and directed Walking with Monsters, which won a 58th Primetime Emmy Awards in the category Outstanding Animated Program (For Programming One Hour or More) and a VES as well as being nominated for a BAFTA and RTS.

Her series, Fight For Life, received record ratings for BBC1, as well as winning BAFTA, RTS and VES awards. In 2010 her work was Emmy-nominated for America – Story of Us (for THC). Her film Buy Now was nominated for two Emmys and won one.

She was Head of Development for Impossible Pictures and Creative Director for Jane Root's Nutopia, where she developed series America - Story of Us, One Strange Rock (Nat Geo, Netflix) and Babies (Netflix) .

She is currently Creative Director and Executive Producer at Grain Media focused on projects which smuggle social purpose into wide-audience-reaching narratives.

Leland is the daughter of author, environmentalist and ecologist, Stephanie Lenz and director, writer and actor, David Leland.

== Filmography ==
- 1987 – Wish You Were Here (as actress)

SINGLES AND SERIES

- 1999 – Swingers Faithful To You in My Fashion (as associate producer)
- 2001 – Red Gold: The Epic Story of Blood (as associate producer)
- 2002 – Secret Life of the Crocodile – BBC 1.
- 2003 – Genome – BBC1.
- 2003 – Stephen Lawrence – Ten Years After (as director)
- 2005 – Walking with Monsters EMMY and BAFTA winner- (as director and producer)
- 2007 – Fight for Life BAFTA winner - (as director and series visual effects director)
- 2010 – America – The Story of US. Series visual effects creative director
- One Strange Rock - Nat Geo- Development Consultant/Exec
- Babies - Netflix - Development Consultant/Exec
- 2017 – Barbarians Rising EMMY NOM – show runner and series visual effects creative director/producer

FEATURE DOCUMENTARIES

- A Concert For George - self shooting director
- Convergence - Netflix - EP
- From Devil’s Breath - MSNBC - Producer
- The Walk - EP
- The Lost Children - Netflix - EP
- Buy Now - Netflix - EP
