= Walking with Beasts =

2001 British television documentary series

- Cover of the original UK DVD release
- Also known as: Walking with Prehistoric Beasts
- Genre: Nature documentary Docudrama
- Created by: Tim Haines; Jasper James; Andrew Wilks
- Directed by: Jasper James; Nigel Paterson
- Narrated by: Kenneth Branagh; Stockard Channing (US); Christian Slater (Prehistoric Planet)
- Composer: Ben Bartlett
- Country of origin: United Kingdom
- Original language: English
- No. of episodes: 6

Production
- Executive producer: Tim Haines
- Producers: Jasper James; Nigel Paterson
- Cinematography: John Howarth; Michael Pitts
- Editors: Greg Smith; Andrew Wilks
- Running time: 30 minutes
- Production companies: BBC Science Unit; Impossible Pictures
- Budget: £4.2 million (Note: Some sources give alternate figures. According to behind-the-scenes material from the later series Walking with Monsters (2005), Walking with Dinosaurs, Walking with Beasts and Walking with Monsters cost a total of £15 million to make. Walking with Monsters had a budget of around £3 million and Walking with Dinosaurs had a budget of £6.1 million.)

Original release
- Network: BBC, Discovery Channel, ProSieben, TV Asahi
- Release: 15 November – 20 December 2001

Walking with Beasts, marketed as Walking with Prehistoric Beasts in North America, is a 2001 six-part nature documentary television miniseries created by Impossible Pictures and produced by the BBC Science Unit, the Discovery Channel, ProSieben and TV Asahi. The sequel to the 1999 miniseries Walking with Dinosaurs, Walking with Beasts explores the life in the Cenozoic era, after the extinction of the non-avian dinosaurs, particularly focusing on the rise of the mammals to dominance. The UK version of the series is narrated by Kenneth Branagh, who also narrated Walking with Dinosaurs, and the US version is narrated by Stockard Channing.

Like Walking with Dinosaurs, Walking with Beasts recreated extinct animals through a combination of computer-generated imagery and animatronics, incorporated into live action footage shot at various locations. It was more challenging to create convincing effects, both computer graphics and animatronics, depicting mammals owing both to fur and more moving bits and to audiences being more familiar with how mammals look and move than they were with dinosaurs. The visual effects of Walking with Beasts, like those of Walking with Dinosaurs, received praise. The series won numerous awards, including a BAFTA Interactive Entertainment Award, a Monitor Award, a RTS Television Award and a Primetime Emmy Award.

== Premise ==
Walking with Beasts follows the previous series Walking with Dinosaurs (1999) in showcasing prehistoric life in a nature documentary style. Beginning in Germany 49 million years ago (in the Eocene), Walking with Beasts tracks animal life, particularly the rise of the mammals to dominance, in the Cenozoic era. The series also gives some insight into human evolution, with Next of Kin (episode four) being devoted to Australopithecus and Mammoth Journey (episode six) including both Neanderthals and anatomically modern humans.

== Production ==
=== Pre-production, research and writing ===
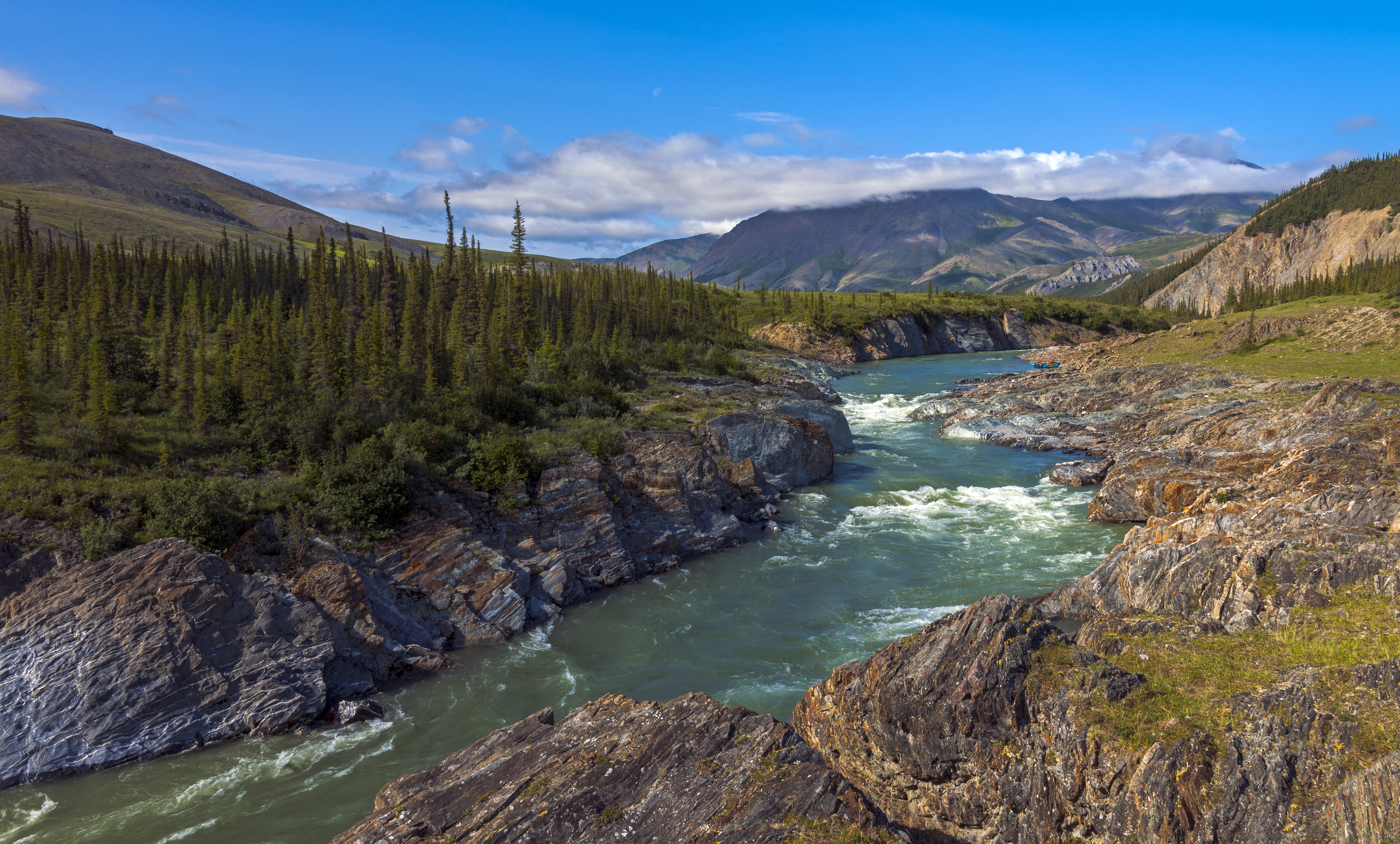
The final episode of Walking with Beasts, Mammoth Journey, was filmed in Yukon, Canada

After the success of Walking with Dinosaurs, executive producer Tim Haines conceived Walking with Beasts as a sequel. The intended goal of the series was to introduce the general public to the fascinating mammals (and other animals) of the Cenozoic Era, typically less represented in popular culture than dinosaurs. The budget of Walking with Beasts was £4.2 million ($3.2 million), one of the most expensive documentaries ever made but much lower than a feature film with comparable visual effects needs. Tim Haines attributed the completion of the series despite this to solid planning.

Research in preparation for Walking with Beasts was conducted full-time for nearly two years by the geologist Paul Chambers and the zoologist Alex Freeman. Like Walking with Dinosaurs, Walking with Beasts was set to consist of six episodes which meant that six suitable settings had to be chosen for the programme. Chambers and Freeman picked the six settings of the programme based on the amount of good fossil evidence, position in the time line and number of interesting animals. The settings of some episodes had been picked already before any research was required, such as doing an episode on woolly mammoths and an episode on indricotheres. For much of the process, Chambers and Freeman were considering more than six settings, which meant that some potential episode ideas were forced to be abandoned. Among the abandoned ideas were an episode set in Australia, based on fossils from the Riversleigh World Heritage Area. After the selection had been narrowed down to six settings, selecting which animals would appear in each episode was a straightforward process.

After Chambers and Freeman had decided upon suitable settings for the programme, the filming locations for Walking with Beasts were chosen by the assistant producer Annie Bates over a nine-month period. Bates first spoke with palaeobotanists to figure out suitable locations that were sufficiently similar to the intended ancient landscapes. After determining a comprehensive enough selection of possible filming locations, Bates traveled to the different sites with a video camera to shoot test footage, which was then viewed by the producers to get an idea of the terrain. Filming locations for Walking with Beasts included Florida, Mexico, Java, Arizona, Brazil, South Africa and Yukon.

In order to write the storylines for the series, producers Jasper James and Nigel Paterson watched numerous nature documentaries on modern animals. They wanted to avoid episodes simply becoming "lists of animals and how they lived" and instead wanted them to draw viewers in and make them want to know what would happen to the animals next. Chambers and Freeman also worked on the storylines, with the goal of ensuring that as much inferred behaviour as possible of each animal was showcased in the series. In the end, each episode of Walking with Beasts ended up with a different type of story. Next of Kin (episode four) for instance follows a group of Australopithecus going through rough times and Land of Giants (episode three) follows a young Indricotherium (Note: Indricotherium is today generally considered synonymous with the genus Paraceratherium.) for the first few years of its life. Details of the plot and how animals behaved were guided by fossil evidence; James maintained in behind-the-scenes material that no details in the storylines of Walking with Beasts were based on fiction.

=== Special effects and filming ===
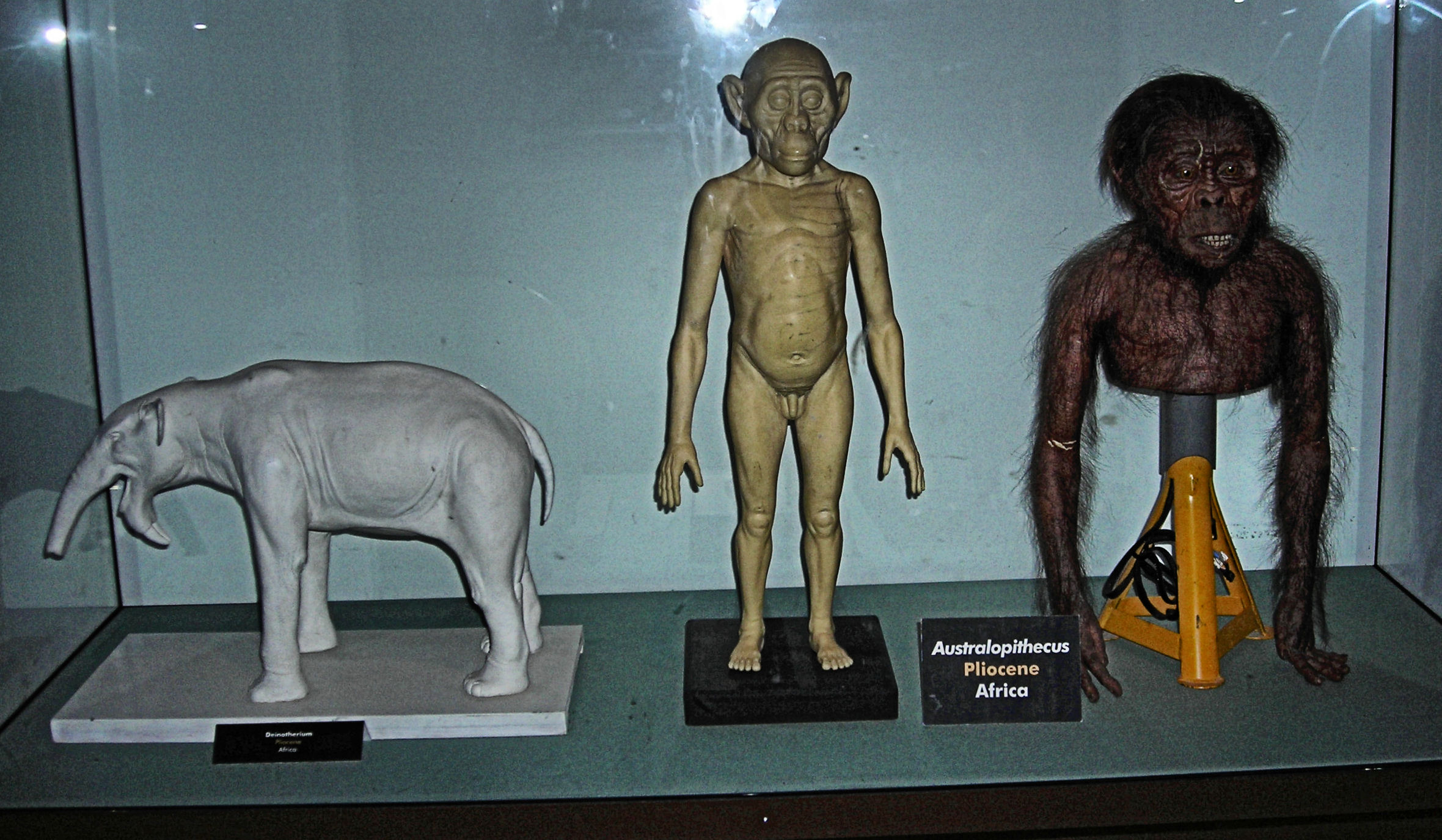
Maquettes of Deinotherium (left) and Australopithecus (right), used to create the computer models in Walking with Beasts

Chambers and Freeman worked with sculptors to create accurate reconstructions of the animals in the series. Relevant specialist palaeontologists and other researchers were consulted for each animal to gather advice on behavior and appearance. For some of the animals featured in Walking with Beasts, no models had ever been made before. The model makers also worked based on drawings and photographs of fossil material. Each maquette took several weeks to create. The finished maquettes were scanned into computers with 3D. The textures of the animals were designed by skin designers, with advice from researchers. For some of the animals in Mammoth Journey (episode six), cave paintings could give an idea of real life colors but for most others the patterns were educated guesswork.

As in Walking with Dinosaurs, the computer graphics for Walking with Beasts were created by the visual effects company Framestore. Animators worked closely with researchers; experts were brought in to look at the movements of each animal to ensure that they moved accurately and advice was gathered on what behaviours each creature could have exhibited. Animating the animals in Walking with Beasts was more difficult than in Walking with Dinosaurs owing to mammals having more moving bits than dinosaurs, such as whiskers, eyebrows and various floppy and wobbly parts. Additionally, the production team believed audiences would be more critical of the movements of mammals than they had been of dinosaurs since viewers would be more familiar with how mammals move; it would thus be easier to spot inaccurate movement. The most difficult creature to animate in the series was Australopithecus, which in terms of their movement had to appear "more than an ape but less than a human".

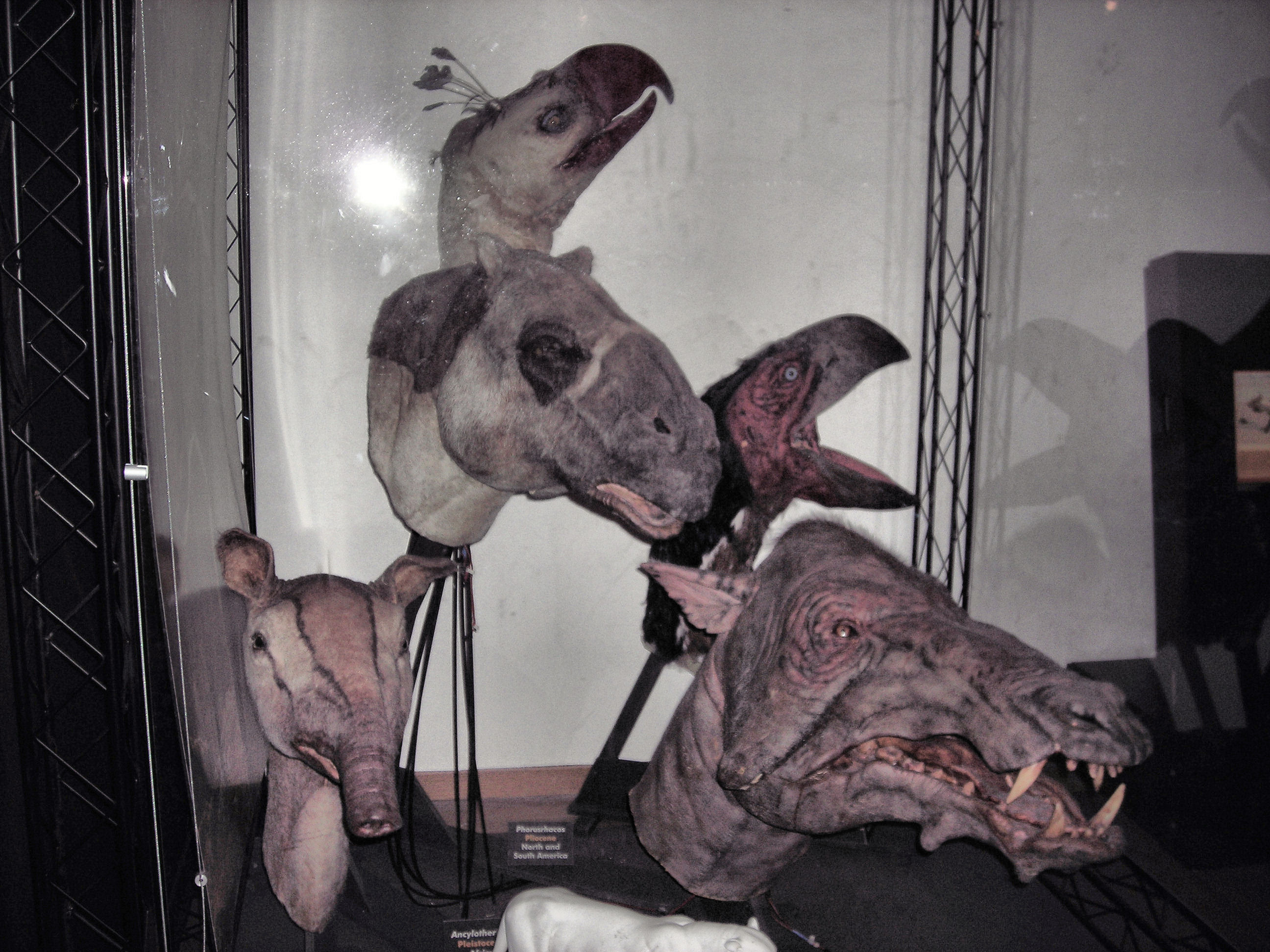
Puppet heads of various animals used for certain shots in the series

Filming Walking with Beasts took four or five weeks. Filming was usually a matter of gathering location shots where the computer-generated animals would then be inserted later. Sometimes it was necessary to replicate the impact the animated animals would have on their environment—such as footprints left in the snow by a woolly mammoth. Not all parts of filming the series were entirely imaginary, as Walking with Beasts also made extensive use of animatronics and puppets for close-up shots. The animatronics and puppets in Walking with Beasts were created by special effects company Crawley Creatures, the same company responsible for the animatronics in the preceding Walking with Dinosaurs. On account of many of the animals in Walking with Beasts having fur or hair and requiring more complex facial expressions, creating the animatronics for Walking with Beasts was more difficult than for the previous series. During production, the animatronics team grew from seven to eighteen and additional support was brought in through hiring specialist out-workers.

As with the computer graphics, experts were also consulted for some of the practical effects. Among the scientists consulted were archaeologist and anthropologist Michael Bisson, an expert on Middle Palaeolithic tools, who helped craft some of the tools shown being used by Neanderthals and anatomically modern humans in the series.

The animatronics were created and used over a period of one-and-a-half years. In total there were over 40 different animatronic elements used, most of which were animatronic heads of animals. The broad movements of the animatronics were controlled by puppeteers, while their more subtle movements were remote-controlled and operated via servo motors. Australopithecus was in some close-ups portrayed by actors with prosthetics. Neanderthals and anatomically modern humans were consistently portrayed by actors also in non close-up shots, the Neanderthal actors wearing prosthetics. The prosthetics used by the actors were also made by Crawley Creatures.

=== Sound design and music ===
The sound design for Walking with Beasts was done by Kenny Clark. Clark and his partner Jovan Ajder began the process by recording foley sound effects, such as footsteps. Then, Clark and Ajder began constructing a sound library through recording their own sounds and contacting web-based FX companies as well as companies around the world. After a great collection of different animal sounds had been assembled, different sounds were mixed together, cut up or played backwards to create creature sounds. The noises of Leptictidium were otter noises, pitch shifted and reversed, and the sounds of Gastornis were made by a monkey and a rattlesnake, slightly edited. Megatherium was voiced through goat noises, though considerably lowered in pitch, Embolotherium were voiced by walruses and rhinos, Macrauchenia by donkeys, Indricotherium by bears and rhinoceroses and Chalicotherium by a hippopotamus. Australopithecus was initially planned to be voiced through harmonised human voices, an idea that was abandoned in favour of monkey sounds. The Woolly Mammoths were voiced by elephants and Smilodon were voiced by lions and tigers. The final sound mixing was done by Chris Burdon, who combined a total of 64 sound tracks (including narration, music, animal sounds and background noises) to produce one final stereo mix for the series.

Ben Bartlett, who had previously worked on Walking with Dinosaurs, composed the music for Walking with Beasts. The composition process began with Bartlett and the directors (Jasper James and Nigel Paterson) viewing the different episodes together without sound and determining specific scenes that stood out as especially requiring music. Bartlett approached Walking with Beasts differently than he had Walking with Dinosaurs; the score in the previous series often included sophisticated themes and orchestral sweeps to reflect the grandeur of the dinosaurs. When it came to the Cenozoic, Bartlett found the era much harder to characterise, concluding that the "beasts" were less "refined" than the dinosaurs before them. As a result, the score of Walking with Beasts intentionally disobeys standard rules of sophisticated harmony, focusing on simplicity but also at times having "big blocks of sound [crashing] in uninvited".

== Episodes ==
=== Walking with Beasts ===
No.	Title	Epoch and location	Directed by	Original release date	U.K. viewers (millions)
1	"New Dawn"	Germany, 49 mya (Paleogene, Eocene)	Jasper James & Nigel Paterson	15 November 2001	13.99 (Note: The viewing figures are 7-day data, including the original Thursday broadcast and Sunday repeat for the six main episodes.)
The first episode is set sixteen million years after the extinction of the non-avian dinosaurs. Birds, a surviving lineage of archosaur, such as Gastornis, (Note: Gastornis is today generally believed to have been herbivorous) rule the world, and mammals remain very small. The episode explores the forerunners of later lineages of Cenozoic animals and centers on a family of shrew-like Leptictidium living upon the volcanic lake of Messel pit. Other creatures featured in this time include Propalaeotherium, an early forerunner of horses, Ambulocetus, an amphibious ancestor of the whales, and Godinotia, an early primate.
2	"Whale Killer"	Tethys Sea/Pakistan, 36 mya (Paleogene, Eocene)	Jasper James & Nigel Paterson	22 November 2001	11.34
The second episode is set during a cooling period in the late Eocene, which drastically changed the ocean currents and climate. Climate change impacts different animals in different ways. On land, the giant predatory animal Andrewsarchus is driven to the beach to feed on sea turtles and a herd of Embolotherium struggle to survive. In the ocean, a pregnant Basilosaurus struggles to keep herself and her unborn calf fed, failing to hunt both Moeritherium and Apidium after being forced to swim into a mangrove swamp in search for food. The Dorudon also makes an appearance.
3	"Land of Giants"	Mongolia, 25 mya (Paleogene, Late Oligocene)	Jasper James & Nigel Paterson	29 November 2001	9.27
The third episode takes place in the late Oligocene in Mongolia, where seasonal rains are followed by long periods of drought. It follows a mother Indricotherium, an enormous hornless rhinoceros, and her young male calf. The mother struggles to raise her calf, fending off threats such as Hyaenodon and trying to teach the calf to survive on its own. The episode also follows other animals in the surroundings, including Hyaenodon, Entelodon and Chalicotherium, and the hardships they endure as the drought drags on.
4	"Next of Kin"	Ethiopia, 3.2 mya (Neogene, Pliocene)	Jasper James & Nigel Paterson	6 December 2001	N/A (<5.92) (Note: Not reported in the weekly top 15 programmes for four-screen viewer ratings.)
The fourth episode is set in the Great Rift Valley in Ethiopia and follows a tribe of Australopithecus, small early hominins and among the first apes to be able to walk upright. The social bonds and hierarchy of the tribe are explored, as are the means of communication of Australopithecus, relations between different tribes, and how they survive among dangerous animals such as the elephant ancestor Deinotherium and the Dinofelis. Certain Australopithecus are given names, such as the dominant male "Grey", his rival "Hercules", and the young orphan "Blue".
5	"Sabre Tooth"	Paraguay, 1 mya (Quaternary, Pleistocene)	Jasper James & Nigel Paterson	13 December 2001	5.87
The fifth episode explores the strange fauna of South America, by this point isolated for millions of years, and the effects of the Great American Interchange, which happened about 1.5 million years earlier. Among the strange animals inhabiting South America are the giant armored Doedicurus, the trunked and camel-like Macrauchenia, the giant ground sloth Megatherium and the gigantic terror bird Phorusrhacos. The episode particularly focuses on the Smilodon, following a male individual nicknamed "Half Tooth" and his efforts to reclaim his clan and territory after being defeated and driven away by two rival male Smilodon. It also focuses on how Smilodon's 8-inch-long upper canines were too fragile to bite into bone, and how Smilodon could therefore eat only the more tender parts of its kill. Afterwards, Phorusrhacos would scavenge the remains of Smilodon kills.
6	"Mammoth Journey"	Belgium, 30 ka (Quaternary, Pleistocene)	Jasper James & Nigel Paterson	20 December 2001	9.48
The sixth episode takes place during the last ice age, beginning in the peak of summer when the North Sea has become a grassy plain, grazed by woolly mammoths, saiga antelopes and bison. Also present are anatomically modern humans. The episode focuses on the migration of a herd of woolly mammoths, as they march from the North Sea to the Swiss Alps for the winter and then back again for the summer. On their journey, the mammoth herd encounters further ice age animals, such as the giant deer Megaloceros, woolly rhinoceroses and another human species Neanderthals.

BBC One aired the series weekly on Thursday nights, with a regular of repeats the following Sunday afternoon. In 2010, the series was repeated on BBC Three in omnibus format, as three-hour-long episodes.

=== The Science of Walking with Beasts ===
A two-episode companion documentary, The Science of Walking with Beasts, aired in November 2001 on BBC One. This series featured interviews with palaeontologists and explanations of how the fossil record and modern day descendants have informed what is known about the animals depicted in Walking with Beasts, as well as brief sections showing the development of the CGI and animatronic animals used in the series.

No.	Title	Directed by	Original release date	U.K. viewers (millions)
1	"Triumph of the Beasts"	Kate Bartlett	21 November 2001	N/A (<5.86)
An explanation of how mammals evolved to be larger and more prevalent, eventually taking the dinosaurs' place as some of the most successful creatures on the planet. The Messel pit fossil site and fossil discoveries of Roy Chapman Andrews are featured.
2	"The Beasts Within"	Nigel Paterson	28 November 2001	N/A (<5.96)
An explanation of how prehistoric apes evolved into modern man, and which attributes made human ancestors so successful. The La Cotte de St Brelade site is featured.

== Reception ==
The first airing of New Dawn, the first episode of Walking with Beasts, on BBC One attracted 8.5 million viewers and an 81% audience share. Though this fell short of the first airing of Walking with Dinosaurs (15 million viewers), it was considered a major success owing to 2001's more competitive broadcasting environment and due to being 3.6 million viewers above the average audience of BBC One during the time slot.

=== Reviews ===
Walking with Beasts was praised for its effects. Both Paul Hoggart, writing for The Times, and Nancy Banks-Smith, writing for The Guardian, concurred that the series showed technical brilliance and stunning computer reconstructions. Banks-Smith however criticised the narration, writing that it had not "advanced beyond chalk and blackboard" and that it was "so clearly addressed to a clever but cloth-eared child that you felt yourself dwindle and shrink". Jennifer Selway, writing for the Daily Express, noted that although the technology and effort that went into Walking with Beasts was "breathtaking", its subject matter did not hold the same appeal as the dinosaurs and that the production team perhaps should have made "Walking with More Dinosaurs" instead.

=== Awards ===
Walking with Beasts won a BAFTA Interactive Entertainment Award for Enhancement of Linear Media, a Monitor Award for Film Originated Television Specials - 3D Animation, a RTS Television Award for Multi-Media and Interactive and a Primetime Emmy Award for Outstanding Animated Program (For Programming One Hour of More). Walking with Beasts was also nominated for a Primetime Emmy Award for Outstanding Visual Effects for a Miniseries, Movie or a Special and BAFTA TV Awards for Best Sound (Factual) and Best Visual Effects & Graphic Design.

== In other media ==
=== Books ===
A companion book to the series, titled Walking with Beasts: A Prehistoric Safari (titled just Walking with Prehistoric Beasts in the United States), was authored by Haines and released in 2001. The book is a coffee-table book which explores life in the Cenozoic through the same settings and animals as in the series itself and it contains sidebars with facts and is illustrated with stills from the series. A Prehistoric Safari was positively reviewed in the book review magazine Publishers Weekly.

In addition to the larger companion book, there were also several children's books released to accompany the series: Walking with Beasts Annual 2002 (a longer hardback book), Walking with Beasts: 3-D Beasts (with 3D images) and Walking with Beasts: Survival! by Stephen Cole, with pictures from the series. Walking with Beasts: Survival! was released in the United States under the title Walking with Prehistoric Beasts: Photo Journal. There was also a Walking with Beasts sticker book.

=== Exhibition ===
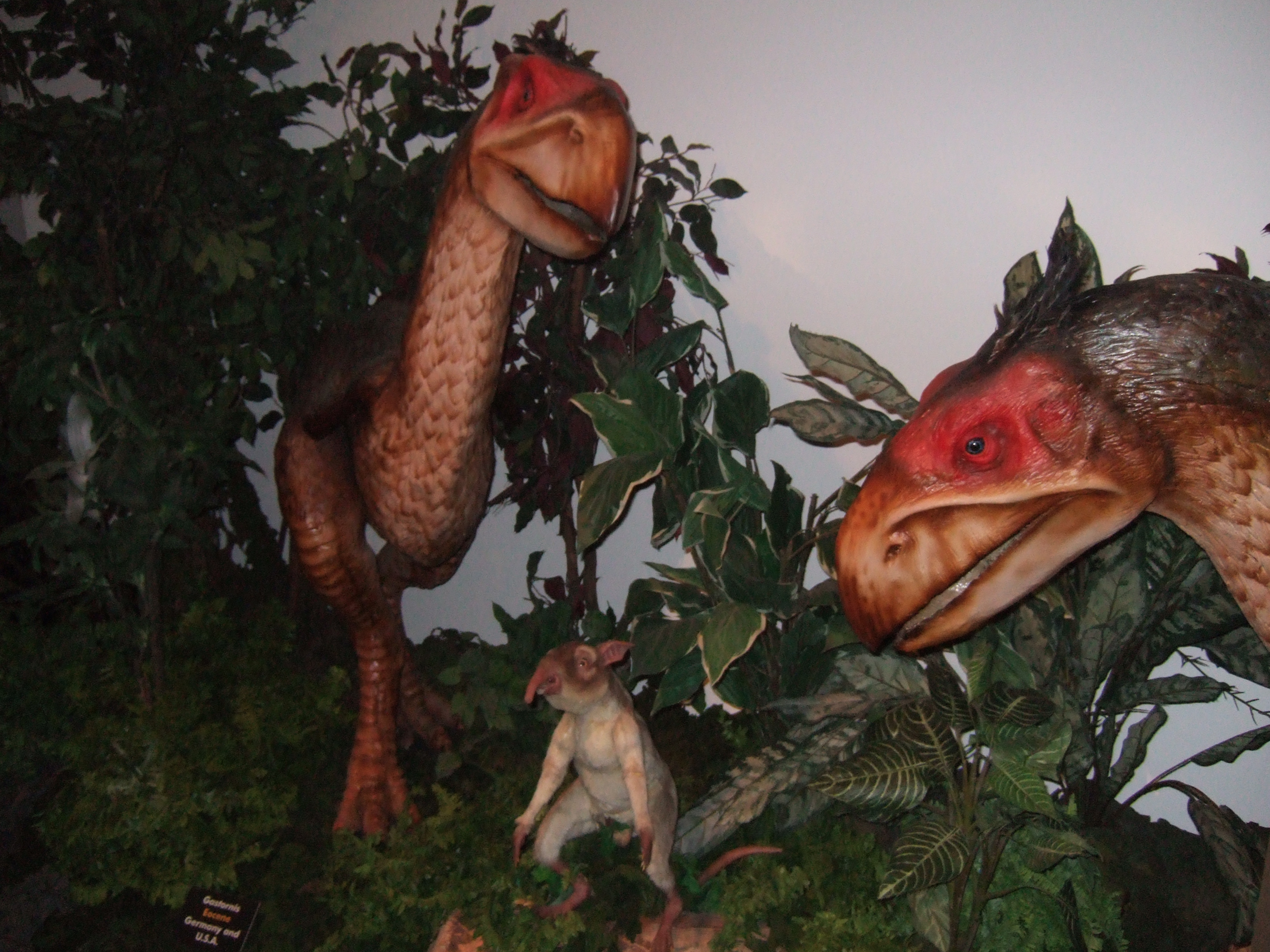
Gastornis models from the Walking with Beasts exhibition

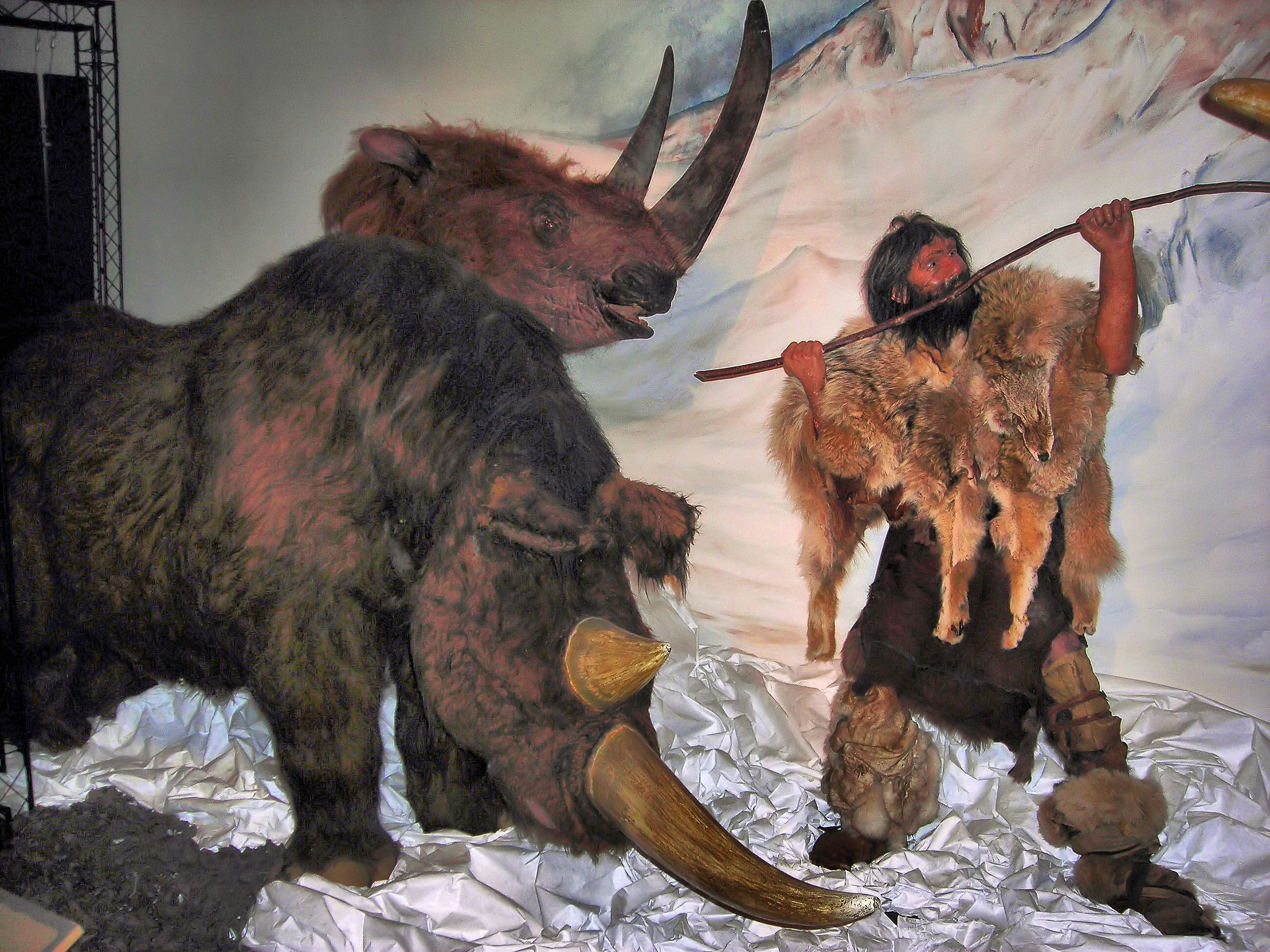
Woolly rhinoceros models from the Walking with Beasts exhibition

An exhibition based on Walking with Beasts was launched by the BBC in 2007. The exhibition featured life-sized models of many of the animals that appeared in the series, information on the science behind Walking with Beasts, original animatronics and puppets from the series, real fossils, as well as various activities for visitors.

The exhibition was first held at the Horniman Museum in London from 10 February to 4 November 2007. It was later at the Aberdeen Science Centre in Aberdeen, Scotland, from 23 March to 30 September 2009 and then at the Herbert Art Gallery and Museum in Coventry, England from 2 July to 30 October 2011.

=== Video game ===
Walking with Beasts: Operation Salvage is a CD-ROM video game for Windows developed by Absolute Studios and published by BBC Worldwide Ltd. on 23 November 2001 as a tie-in to the series. A top-down shooter, Operation Salvage is set in 2036 after mankind's discovery of time travel. Players take the role of an agent of the World Wildlife Bionetwork (WWB), travelling back in time throughout the Cenozoic, observing different animals and fighting an organisation that is trapping the different creatures. The game received mixed reviews: 7Wolf Magazine gave it 4.5 out of 10.

=== Interactive version ===
Walking with Beasts aired as an interactive programme during its original UK broadcast, the first time the BBC had developed an interactive service for a non-sports programme. Among the various interactive features accessible through viewers' remote controls were the possibility to switch between narration by Kenneth Branagh and Dilly Barlow, to access figures and facts through pop-ups, and to view behind-the-scenes material.

=== Website ===
An accompanying website to the series was launched in 2001. The Walking with Beasts website featured extensive behind-the-scenes information on the production of the series, information on the fossil evidence used to reconstruct the animals and their environments, fact files for the animals, numerous articles on palaeontological topics such as climate throughout the Cenozoic and the extinction of the non-avian dinosaurs, as well as various games. Games included the "Shoot the Fish experiment", where players could experiment with evolution through a simulated fish population, games dealing with topics such as camouflage and fossilisation, as well as jigsaw puzzles with different animal skeletons.
