= The Ballad of Big Al =

2000 British television documentary programme

- Cover of a 2004 UK DVD release
- Also known as: Allosaurus
- Genre: Nature documentary
- Directed by: Kate Bartlett
- Narrated by: Kenneth Branagh; Avery Brooks (US)
- Composer: Ben Bartlett
- Country of origin: United Kingdom
- Original language: English

Production
- Executive producer: Mick Kaczorowski
- Producers: Tim Haines; Joshua C. Berkley
- Running time: 29 minutes
- Production companies: BBC Studios Science Unit; Impossible Pictures

Original release
- Network: BBC, Discovery Channel, ProSieben, TV Asahi
- Release: 25 December – 27 December 2000

The Ballad of Big Al, (Note: Full title: The Ballad of Big Al: A Walking with Dinosaurs Special) marketed as Allosaurus (Note: Full title: Allosaurus: A Walking with Dinosaurs Special) in North America, is a 2000 special episode of the nature documentary television series Walking with Dinosaurs. The Ballad of Big Al is set in the Late Jurassic, 145 million years ago, and follows a single Allosaurus specimen nicknamed "Big Al" whose life story has been reconstructed based on a well-preserved fossil of the same name. The Ballad of Big Al was like the other episodes of Walking with Dinosaurs made by Impossible Pictures and was produced by the BBC Studios Science Unit, the Discovery Channel, ProSieben and TV Asahi. The episode was aired together with a 30-minute behind-the-scenes episode, Big Al Uncovered.

== Production ==
The special was filmed in Arizona. The design of the Allosaurus in the special was altered from the original model used in Walking with Dinosaurs.

== Plot ==
The special begins at the University of Wyoming's Geological Museum, showing the bones of a sauropod followed by an Allosaurus named "Big Al". After the ghost of Big Al wanders the museum passing by his own skeleton and a nest of fossilized eggs, the film then travels back in time to 145 million years ago during the Late Jurassic of Wyoming, showing an Allosaurus nest. Al and his siblings hatch and are helped out of the nest by their mother, who then brings them to a river bank and the hatchlings start to hunt for insects. When the mother leaves the hatchlings temporarily, a one-year-old Allosaurus comes out of hiding and kills one of them; thankfully, Al was not the victim.

Al is then shown at the age of two years and tries to hunt a flock of Dryosaurus. He has not yet learned how to ambush, so he fails to kill one of the swifter, smaller dinosaurs. Later, he snatches a lizard from a branch to keep him satisfied. Al comes across a dead Stegosaurus, and another Allosaurus waiting for death in a pit of sticky mud, which forms a predator trap. Meanwhile, a two-year-old female Allosaurus, attracted to the Stegosaurus carcass, also gets stuck. She struggles to free herself, but fails. Al luckily avoids the same fate, because he has learnt to avoid carrion and the large carnivores that it usually attracts. Unable to escape, the trapped Allosaurus pair die of exhaustion, their corpses left to be feasted upon safely by Anurognathus.

Three years pass, and a herd of Diplodocus are migrating across the Late Jurassic salt lake, heading for a nesting site to the south. Al, now five years old and 30 feet long, is joined by several other Allosaurus and they manage to panic the herd into leaving a sick individual behind. But as the Allosaurus pack gathers for the kill, Al is struck down by the neck of the Diplodocus. The pack decides to wait for a few hours until the Diplodocus is brought down by heat exhaustion and his illness. Though they feed, within the hour, a much larger five-year-old female Allosaurus scavenges the kill. Al takes some remnants of the carcass for himself and leaves, trying to find a safer place to eat.

A year passes by, and Al, now 33 feet long and with the crests over his eyes reddening, is shown drinking at a pond. His presence however makes other dinosaurs around the pond nervous and the smell of blood he brings with him puts off a pair of Stegosaurus that were attempting to mate. Away from the pond, he discovers the scent of a nearby six-year-old female Allosaurus and issues a mating call. She is not interested, but the inexperienced Al persists, and the female turns hostile when he gets too close. Al is lucky enough to escape from the ensuing fight with his life, although he sustains injuries to his right arm and claw, along with smashed ribs. Later, the dry season comes, and Al is attempting to hunt a flock of Dryosaurus. Whilst chasing them however, he trips over a log that falls in his path and ends up breaking something in his right foot in the resultant fall; he limps away, his chances of survival as prey gets scarcer now very unlikely. As the dry season turns to a drought, Al's limp from the fall gets worse and his right middle toe -which he broke in the fall- has become badly infected. Soon, unable to hunt because of this handicap, he dies in a dried-up riverbed, where two infant Allosaurus are hunting for bugs, and come across his emaciated carcass. He is said not to have reached full size, dying as a mature adolescent and that the process of his fossilisation was so perfect it preserved even the injuries he sustained in his lifetime, including lumps where his ribs healed after their break and the raging infection on his middle toe. The narrator concludes the special stating how Big Al, in death, represents a frozen moment in the fast and furious life of a carnivorous dinosaur.

== Episodes ==
No.	Title	Original release date	UK viewers (millions)
1	"The Ballad of Big Al"	25 December 2000	N/A (<6.47) (Note: Not reported in the weekly top 15 programmes for four-screen viewer ratings.)
A biography of how Big Al might have lived, in the same format as the original series. Includes many of the dinosaurs seen in the previous Walking with Dinosaurs episode Time of the Titans, alongside the new additions Apatosaurus, Dryosaurus and Othnielia.
2	"Big Al: The Science" (Note: Renamed 'Big Al: The Science' and 'Allosaurus: Big Al Uncovered' on the UK and USA DVD releases respectively.)	27 December 2000	6.72
A documentary following the scientific research that informed Big Al's life story, including the similarities dinosaurs shared with birds and Crocodilians, the fossil site that inspired the predator trap scene, and the fossil specimens Big Al the Allosaurus and Willo the Thescelosaurus.

== Reception ==
=== Reviews ===
Julie Salamon gave The Ballad of Big Al a positive review in The New York Times, deeming it an excellent follow-up to the original series of Walking with Dinosaurs, praising the computer animation, the authentic animal designs and the presentation of the programme.

=== Awards ===
The Ballad of Big Al won two 2001 Emmy Awards, one for Outstanding Sound Editing for a Non-Fiction Program and one for Outstanding Animated Program (For Programming More Than One Hour). It was also nominated for Outstanding Special Visual Effects for a Miniseries, Movie or a Special. The Online Film & Television Association also awarded The Ballad of Big Al with two awards, one for Best Visual Effects in a Series and one for Best Informational Special.

== In other media ==
=== Children's book ===
The Ballad of Big Al was adapted into a children's book by Stephen Cole. Titled Allosaurus! The Life and Death of Big Al, the book was published in North America by Dutton Children's Books on 4 June 2001.

=== Website ===
An accompanying website to The Ballad of Big Al was launched in 2000, featuring a written retelling of Big Al's story by the researcher Alexandra Freeman and an online role-playing game, the Big Al game, based on the episode.
