= Paul Hoggart =

- Died: March 5, 2024
- Occupations: Journalist, novelist
- Spouse: Elizabeth (m. 2001)
- Children: 3
- Relatives: Richard Hoggart (father); Simon Hoggart (brother)

Paul Hoggart was a British journalist and novelist.

== Early life and career ==
Hoggart spent some years as a further education lecturer at Kingsway College and then Woolwich College in London before moving into journalism as a book reviewer, feature writer, television critic, columnist and interviewer particularly for The Times. He also wrote for The Guardian, Observer, The Independent, Daily Telegraph, Radio Times, Broadcast, The Stage, Saga and Young Performer magazines, and the screenwriters’ website twelvepoint.com.

His first novel, A Man Against a Background of Flames, was published on Kindle by Pighog Press. in April 2013. The print edition was published in October 2013.

== Personal life ==
He was the younger son of Richard Hoggart and brother of the political journalist Simon Hoggart. His sister Nicola is a teacher. He married his wife Elizabeth in Las Vegas, Nevada in 2001, although they had been together for twenty-five years prior to that. They lived in north London and had three children: Matthew, Edward and Rose.
