= BBC Studios Productions =

British content production company

BBC Studios Productions Limited
- Formerly: BBC Studios Limited (2015–2018)
- Company type: Division
- Industry: Television production
- Founded: 27 February 2015
- Area served: United Kingdom
- Revenue: ▲£423 million (2022)
- Net income: ▲£24 million (2022)
- Total assets: ▲£32 million (2022)
- Owner: BBC
- Parent: BBC Studios
- Divisions: BBC Studios Science Unit; BBC Studios Natural History Unit; BBC Studios Factual Entertainment Productions; BBC Studios Music Productions; BBC Studios Entertainment Productions; BBC Studios Continuing Drama Productions; BBC Studios Event Productions; BBC Studios Documentary Unit; BBC Studios Drama Productions; BBC Studios Comedy Productions; BBC Studios Kids & Family Productions; BBC Studios Specialist Factual Productions
- Subsidiaries: Mortimer Productions; Nice and Accurate Productions
- Website: productions.bbcstudios.com

BBC Studios Productions Limited is a British content production company and is BBC Studios' national production division, producing a wide range of programmes such as Top Gear and Strictly Come Dancing. BBC Studios Productions is responsible for producing programmes while BBC Studios is in charge of ventures like UKTV and the distribution and selling of formats of BBC programmes. BBC Studios Productions is the biggest content producer in the United Kingdom.

== Divisions ==
BBC Studios Productions has 12 production divisions responsible for producing different programmes for their channels, as well as other broadcasters including Apple TV+, Amazon Prime Video, Channel 4, Channel 5, UKTV, Discovery Channel, Netflix and PBS.

=== BBC Studios Science Unit ===
The BBC Studios Science Unit has produced a wide range of scientific programmes for multiple broadcasters. The department is headed up by Andrew Cohen and is overseen by the Factual Managing Director Tom McDonald.

==== Titles ====
- The Edge of Science (YouTube Original)
- The Surgeon's Cut (Netflix)
- The Planets (BBC Two)
- 8 Days: To the Moon and Back (BBC Two)
- Horizon (BBC Two)
- The Sky at Night (BBC Four)
- Rendezvous with the Future (Bilibili)
- The Truth About... (BBC One)
- Stargazing Live (BBC Two)
- Climate Change – The Facts (BBC One)
- Extinction: The Facts (BBC One)
- Greta Thunberg: A Year to Change the World
- Cook Clever, Waste Less with Prue and Rupy (Channel 4)
- Perpetual Planet: Heros of the Oceans (National Geographic)
- Universe
- Solar System
- Walking with Dinosaurs (1999)
- Walking with Beasts
- Walking with Monsters
- The Planets (1999)
- Wonders of the Solar System
- Wonders of the Universe
- Human Universe
- Planet Dinosaur
- Rise of the Continents
- Wonders of Life
- Forces of Nature

=== BBC Studios Factual Entertainment Productions ===
BBC Studios Factual Entertainment Productions is responsible for delivering entertaining and enriching programmes. The Factual Entertainment productions is headed by Naomi Carter and is overseen by managing director of Factual Entertainment and Events Hannah Wyatt.

==== Titles ====
- Top Gear (BBC One)
- Countryfile (BBC One)
- The One Show (BBC One)
- Nigella: At My Table (BBC Two)
- Dragons' Den (BBC Two)
- Gardeners' World (BBC Two)
- Antiques Roadshow (BBC One)
- Amazing Hotels: Life Beyond the Lobby (BBC Two)
- Bargain Hunt (BBC One)
- Jay Blades' Home Fix (BBC One)
- Nigella's Cook, Eat. Repeat (BBC Two)
- Celebrity Painting Challenge (BBC One)
- DIY SOS (BBC One)
- Morning Live (BBC One)
- It's Grime Up North (Channel 4)
- Weatherman Walking (BBC One)
- Wanted Down Under (BBC One)
- Points of View (BBC One)

=== BBC Studios Music Productions ===
BBC Studios Music Productions is the production arm of BBC Studios Productions responsible for music-related commissions. The BBC Studios Music Productions is headed by James Payne and is overseen by Entertainment and Music Managing Director Suzy Lamb.

==== Titles ====
- Glastonbury (BBC)
- Later... with Jools Holland (BBC Two)
- Mercury Prize (BBC)
- Soul America (BBC Four)
- Reading + Leeds (BBC)
- Top of the Pops (BBC Two)
- BBC Young Musician (BBC Four)
- K-Pop Idols: Inside the Hit Factory (BBC Four)
- Maestro (BBC Two)
- Fleetwood Mac: Don't Stop (BBC One)
- Proms in the Park (BBC)
- Jools' Annual Hootenanny (BBC Two)

=== BBC Studios Entertainment Productions ===
BBC Studios Entertainment Productions produces titles such as Children in Need and Strictly Come Dancing. BBC Studios Entertainment Productions is headed by Mel Balac and is overseen by Entertainment and Music Managing Director Suzy Lamb.

==== Titles ====
- Strictly Come Dancing (BBC One)
- A Question of Sport (BBC One)
- Elton John: Uncensored (BBC One)
- The Big Night In (BBC One)
- Comic Relief (BBC One)
- Children in Need (BBC One)
- Eurovision Song Contest (BBC One)
- A Royal Team Talk: Tackling Mental Health (BBC One)
- The Weakest Link (BBC One)
- EastEnders: Secrets from the Square (BBC One)
- Got It Covered - BBC Children in Need (BBC One)
- Mastermind Cymru (S4C)

=== BBC Studios Kids & Family Productions ===
==== Titles ====
- Andy's Amazing Adventures (co-produced with BBC Studios Natural History Unit)
- Blue Peter (2023 onwards)
- CBeebies: Shakespeare at the Globe (TV special)
- Children Versus Battle SuperStars (co-produced with Blink Industries)
- Crookhaven
- The Beaker Girls
- Bro's in Control (co-produced with Studio 71 UK)
- Deadly Mission Shark
- The Dumping Ground
- Funny Talking Animals (co-produced with Sky Kids)
- Go Jetters
- Go Jetters Go! (Co-produced with the Infocomm Media Development Authority of Singapore)
- Jamie Johnson (Season 7, co-produced with Short Form Film)
- Jamie Johnson FC (Co-produced with Short Form Film)
- Lagging (Season 2 onwards)
- My Friend Maisy (co-produced with Trustbridge Entertainment)
- JoJo & Gran Gran (Co-produced with A Productions)
- Peter & The Wolf (TV special, co-produced with Blink Industries)
- Phoenix Rise (Distributed by Sinking Ship Entertainment)
- The Primrose Railway Children (Television film)
- Rafi the Wishing Wizard
- Saturday Mash-Up! (season 6 onwards)
- Something Special - We're All Friends (Season 13 onwards)
- Stan Can (co-produced with Mackinnon & Saunders)
- Supertato (co-produced with Tencent Kids & Family (Season 1) and BBC Children's and Education (Season 2))
- Odd Squad (season 4-5, co-produced and distributed by Sinking Ship Entertainment)
- Vanishing Point (co-produced with Watch Next Media and Kavaleer Productions)

===== Commissioned/Distributed Titles =====
- Bluey (produced by Ludo Studio)
- Hey Duggee (produced by Studio AKA)
- Hey Duggee's Squirrel Club (produced by Studio AKA)
- Sarah & Duck (produced by Karrot)
- Horrible Histories (produced by Lion Television)
- Horrible Science (produced by Lion Television)
- Nova Jones (Season 2 onwards, produced by JAM Media)
- Obki (produced by Obki Productions)
- Pickle Storm (produced by Black Dog Television)
- Popularity Papers (produced by Aircraft Pictures and WexWorks Media)
- Yakka-Dee! (produced by King Banana TV and Beakus)
- Zog (produced by Magic Light Pictures, excluding UK and Germany)

=== BBC Studios Documentary Unit ===
==== Titles ====
- The Met: Policing London
- Life and Death Row
- Landward
- Rip Off Britain
- Imagine

=== BBC Studios Events Productions ===
The BBC Studios Events Productions unit focuses primarily on events of significance across the UK and was the primary and sole source of all coronation footage which was covered in Ultra-high-definition and distributed to broadcasters domestically and worldwide.

==== Titles ====
- Royal Christmas Message
- Coronation of Charles III and Camilla
- Platinum Party at the Palace
- Trooping the Colour
- The Earthshot Prize
- Festival of Remembrance
- Coronation Concert

=== BBC Studios Drama Productions ===
==== Titles ====
- Doctor Who (Cardiff)
- Father Brown (Birmingham)
- Shakespeare & Hathaway: Private Investigators (Birmingham)
- Silent Witness (Birmingham)
- The Break (Birmingham)
- Sister Boniface Mysteries (Birmingham)

=== BBC Studios Continuing Drama Productions ===
==== Titles ====
- EastEnders
- Casualty
- Doctors
- River City
- Pobol y Cwm

=== BBC Studios Comedy Productions ===
==== Titles ====
- Good Omens
- Inside No. 9
