= Creature suit =

Type of realistic costumes

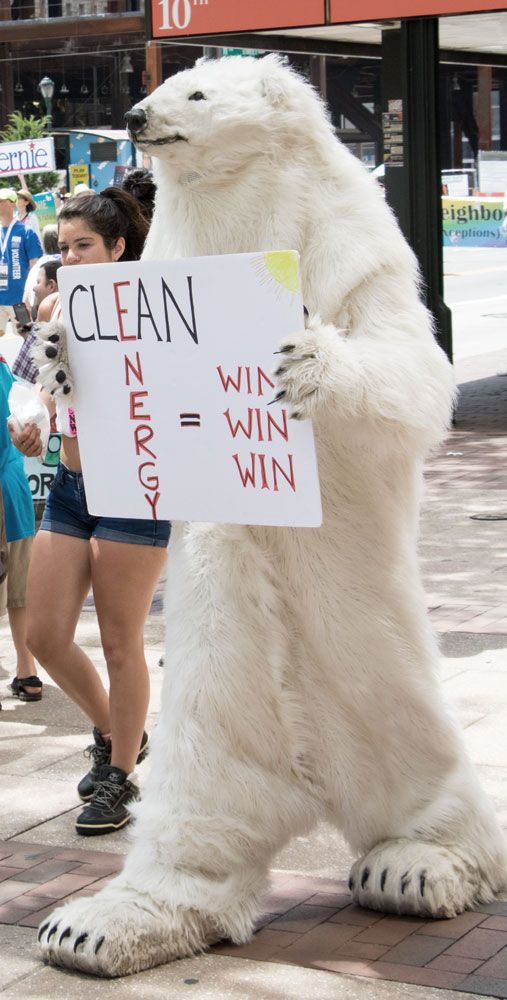
A climate activist wearing a bear suit

Creature suits are realistic costumes used to disguise a performer as an animal, monster, or other being. They are used in film, television, or as costumed characters in live events. Unlike mascots, they are often made with a high degree of realism. In contrast with prosthetic makeup, which is applied to an actor's skin, the wearer is not normally visible outside their movements controlling the costume, although in some cases, part of the wearer's body is still visible (such as in the case of mermaids or other half-human monsters).

== History ==
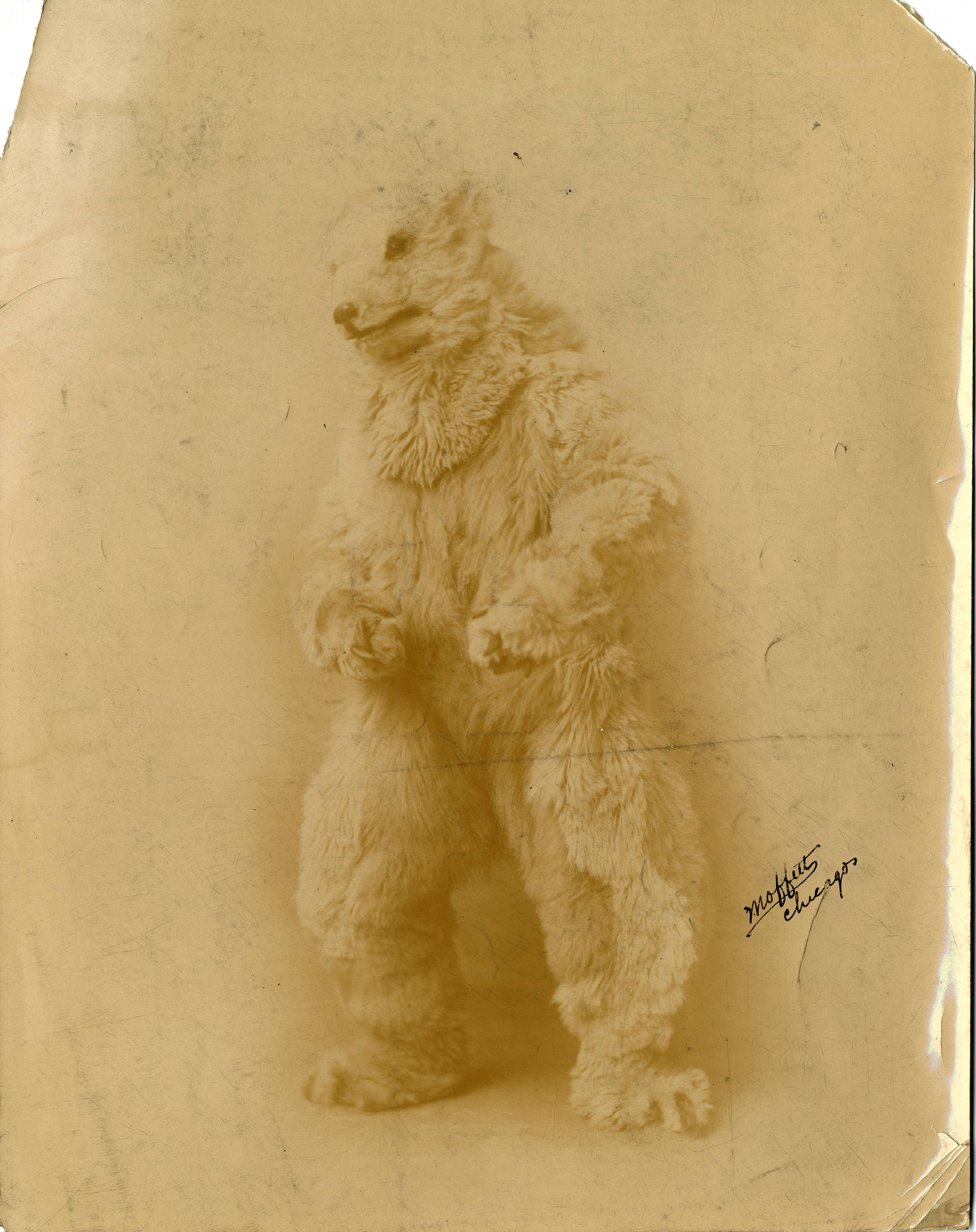
A stage actor in a bear costume, 1909

Creature suits have been used since before movies were invented. As part of his circus sideshow in London in 1846, P. T. Barnum had an actor wearing a fur suit of an "ape-man", and continued to dress actors in similar costumes as attractions. They were used starting from the early days of film as practical effects, to represent animals that were too prohibitive to train or use, such as gorillas. Some films even tried to pass off costumes as real animals, which caused controversy.

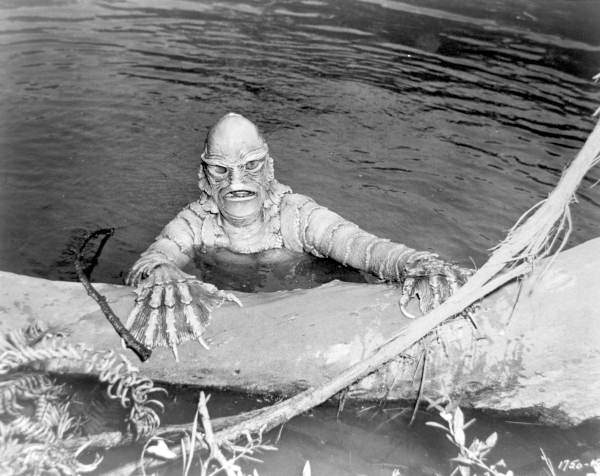
Ricou Browning in costume for Creature from the Black Lagoon

The first foam rubber creature suit used in film was Gill-man, from the film Creature from the Black Lagoon, which released in 1954 and beat Godzilla by half a year. The suit, created by the film special-effects artist Don Post, was extremely hot when worn outside of the water, requiring actor Ben Chapman to be regularly hosed down, and difficult to see out of.

The success of Godzilla caused creature suits to be adopted in the Japanese tokusatsu genre as kaiju, or giant monsters. They were animated using the suitmation technique, combining slow-motion filming and miniature sets to make them appear larger than they really were.

Creature suit technology advanced during the latter half of the 20th century to include modern materials and animatronics integrated into the costume itself, increasing their realism. The animatronics were usually puppeteered by an operator with a remote control. However, their use dropped due to the advent of CGI, which was often cheaper to implement. For example, the suit used in the television series Harry and the Hendersons cost US$1 million.

Despite the fluidity of CGI animals and monsters, purely visual effects are often panned, or, at least, not preferred by discerning film viewers. It is extremely difficult to mimic realistic lighting, leading to most CGI creatures and characters looking obviously fake when placed alongside real environments, especially if the film has a low budget and cannot afford sophisticated 3D modeling and rendering. Films such as Jurassic Park, which made heavy use of practical effects, including creature suits, remain well-regarded for their special effects, while CGI creatures quickly become dated as technology advances. This has led to the continued use of creature suits in modern-day films and commercials to provide additional realism, such as Hellboy and Star Wars: The Force Awakens.

In other instances, CGI and creature suits are combined, using green parts of the suit to chroma key them and add or remove appendages in post-production. This technique was used to hide suit actors' heads in the 2005 film Zathura: A Space Adventure, replace satyr creatures' legs in the 2005 film The Chronicles of Narnia: The Lion, the Witch and the Wardrobe, and to add facial expressions to the monsters in the 2009 film Where the Wild Things Are.

Creature suits have also been used in many live events and productions, such as the dinosaur suits used in Walking with Dinosaurs − The Arena Spectacular. They are also used in LARPs to represent monsters and other creatures that have to interact with players. In addition, they are sometimes used in hoaxes, such as Bigfoot sightings.

== Manufacture ==
Creature suits are usually made by special effects studios, one of the most well known of which is Jim Henson's Creature Shop, or by individual special effects artists. Different body shapes of suits are made using foam padding covered by painted liquid latex (to simulate bare skin) or fake fur. Foam latex can also be used to create suits, and masks may sometimes be made out of fiberglass. More expensive suits have hairs hand-knitted into the foam to give a more realistic, movie-quality appearance, as well as animatronic machinery, usually as part of the mask.

Sometimes, the suits are made by smaller studios or individuals. Cosplayers often make replicas of famous movie monsters. Some of the most commonly seen creature suits in cosplay are the Alien and Predator from their respective series. Other cosplayers make suits of anthropomorphic or monster characters from video games and anime. They can also come in the form of realistic fursuits made to depict the owner's original character, with no prior appearance in mass media.

== Acting ==
Acting inside a creature suit in a professional context is often done by a suit actor who specializes in wearing them. These are typically stunt performers who have practice embodying realistic creature movements. They must not be prone to claustrophobia from being enclosed by the suit, and must be able to deal with difficulty moving, as well as general sensory deprivation and heat conditions.

While most suits are operated by a single wearer, some suits, such as those of large quadrupedal animals like Greenpeace's polar bear Paula, must be worn by multiple people in a similar manner as a pantomime horse. However, the wearers usually refrain from such goofy and comedic antics as their satirical counterparts, in order to add the illusion of lifelike movement.

Notable suit actors include Haruo Nakajima, who portrayed Godzilla in twelve consecutive films, as well as various other giant kaiju, and was considered "invaluable" to the Godzilla franchise. Doug Jones portrayed many monsters in films directed by Guillermo del Toro, including the faun and Pale Man of Pan's Labyrinth, and the Amphibian Man from The Shape of Water. He was slated to portray Frankenstein's monster in a film based on the Dark Universe franchise before it was cancelled. Mark Steger, a veteran creature suit actor, portrayed the Demogorgon of Stranger Things. Misty Rosas, among other roles, portrayed Amy the gorilla in Congo, as well as the aliens Kuiil and Frog Lady in Star Wars spin-off The Mandalorian.

== Common types ==
=== Aliens ===
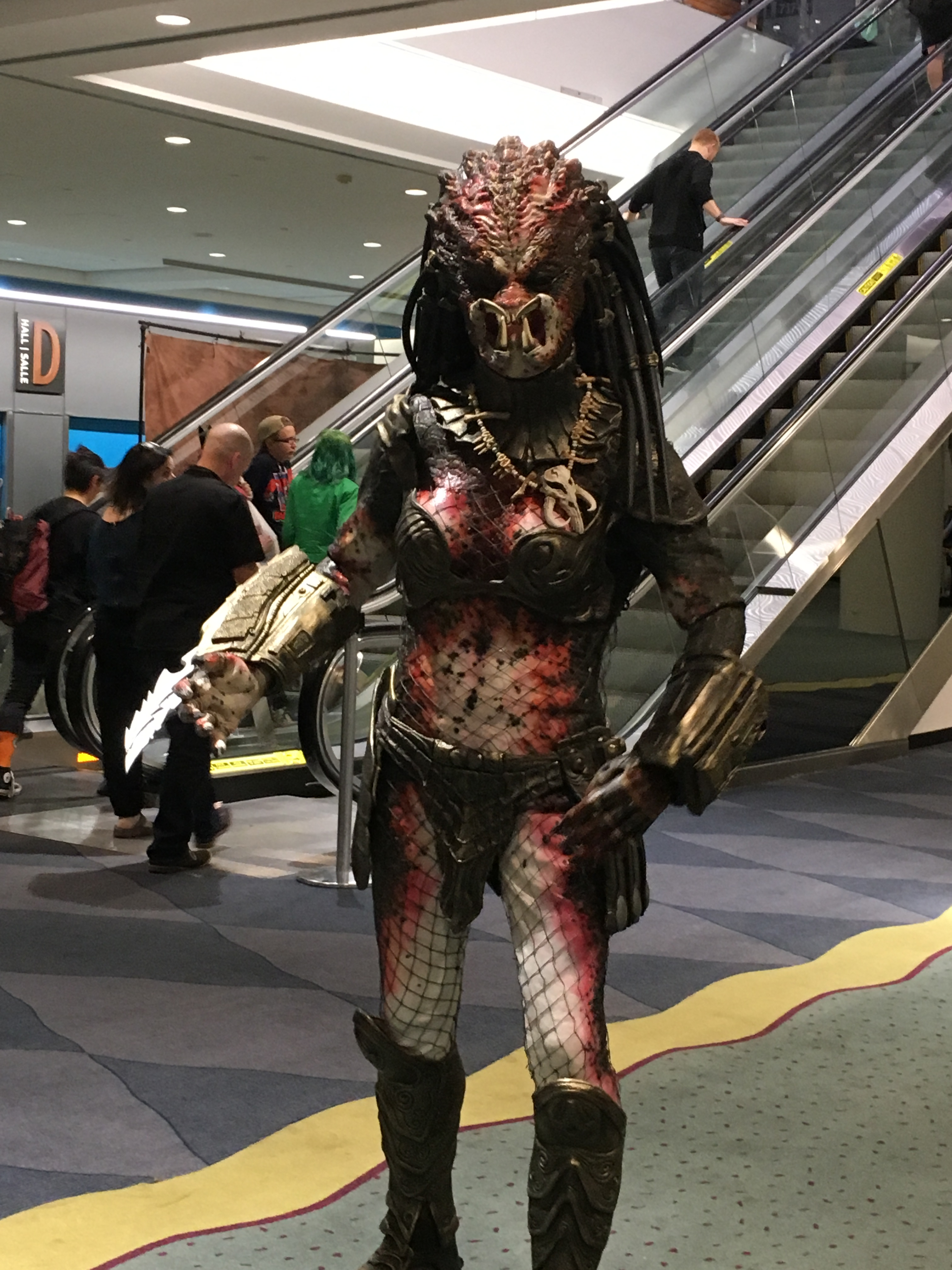
Cosplayer wearing creature suit of a female Predator alien

Many depictions of aliens in film have been done using creature suits of various types, including those in the science-fiction movie franchises Alien and Predator, the television series Doctor Who and The Tommyknockers, and the film The Hitchhiker's Guide to the Galaxy, among others. While shows like Star Trek prefer prosthetic makeup, it has led to the term "rubber forehead alien" due to the fact that most of the aliens look extremely similar to humans save for slight differences in their eye color, skin color or facial prosthetics, and creature suits can allow for more alien body shapes.

=== Animals ===
Many animals have been made into lifelike creature suits, including lions, tigers, rhinos and elephants, foxes, wolves, dolphins, kangaroos, penguins, common ostriches and walruses. The benefits of using a realistic suit include not having the danger of a live animal on set, as well as not having to train them or deal with potential incidents of animal cruelty.

==== Apes and gorillas ====
Ape suits have a great tradition especially on film, with notable works involving them ranging from 1939's The Wizard of Oz to 1968's 2001: A Space Odyssey and Planet of the Apes.

In addition to realistic gorilla suits used in film and television, dressing up as a gorilla for comedic effect has become a public phenomenon. They are sometimes linked to the character of King Kong, who was portrayed using a suit in the Japanese Toho films of which he was protagonist, as well as the 1976 remake and Its sequel.

==== Bears ====
Due to the popularity of bears in popular culture, there have been many realistic bear suits created for film and television. They are also used for live performances, protests and scientific studies.

==== Dinosaurs ====
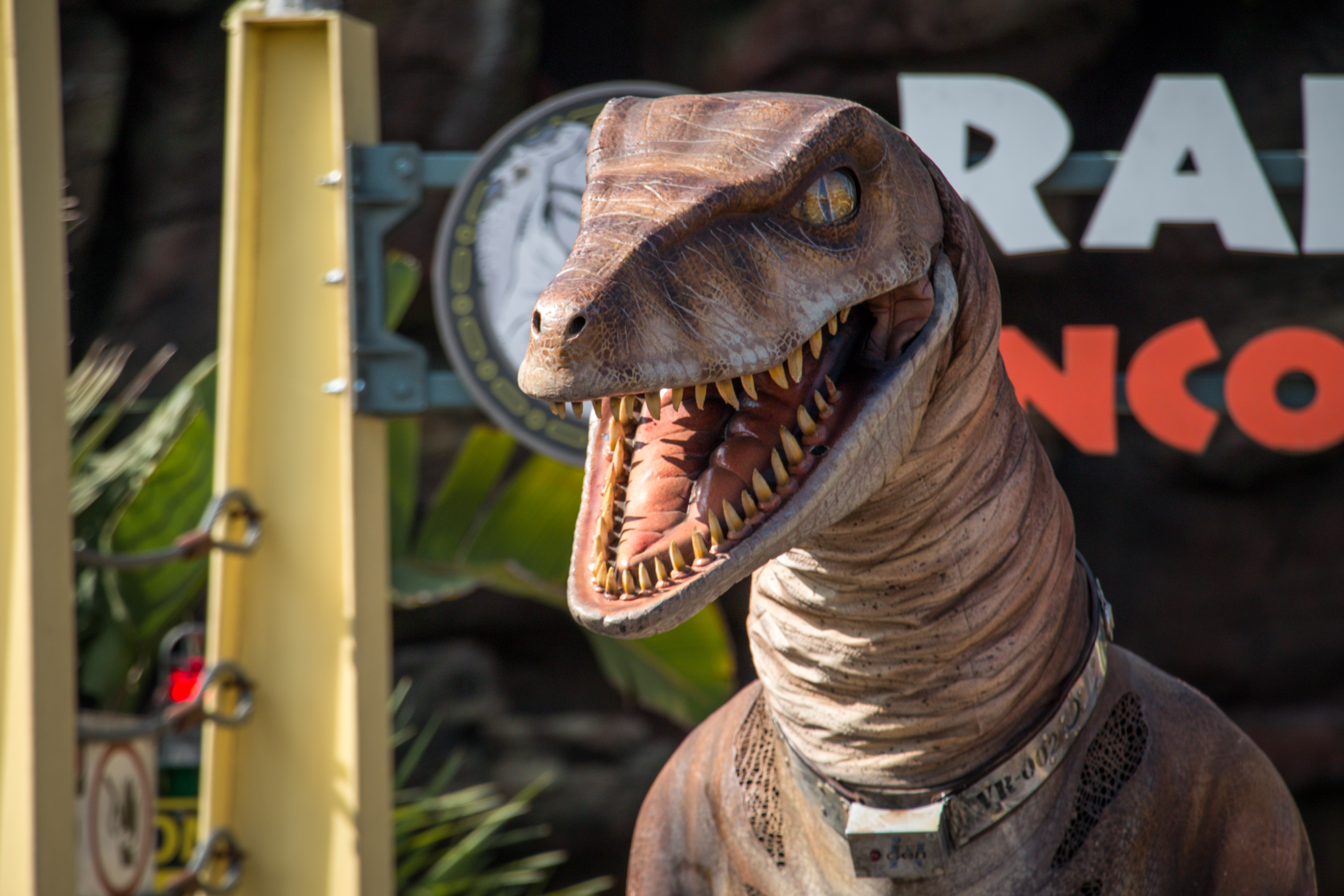
Creature suit of a velociraptor from Universal Studios Hollywood's "Raptor Encounter" attraction

Dinosaur suits were used in film and television throughout their history, and became popular for live-action appearances following the debut of Walking with Dinosaurs: The Arena Spectacular. They are used in theme parks to entertain guests, as well as in educational performances to show people how living dinosaurs looked and behaved, something that is more difficult to depict with stationary displays.

=== Giant monsters ===
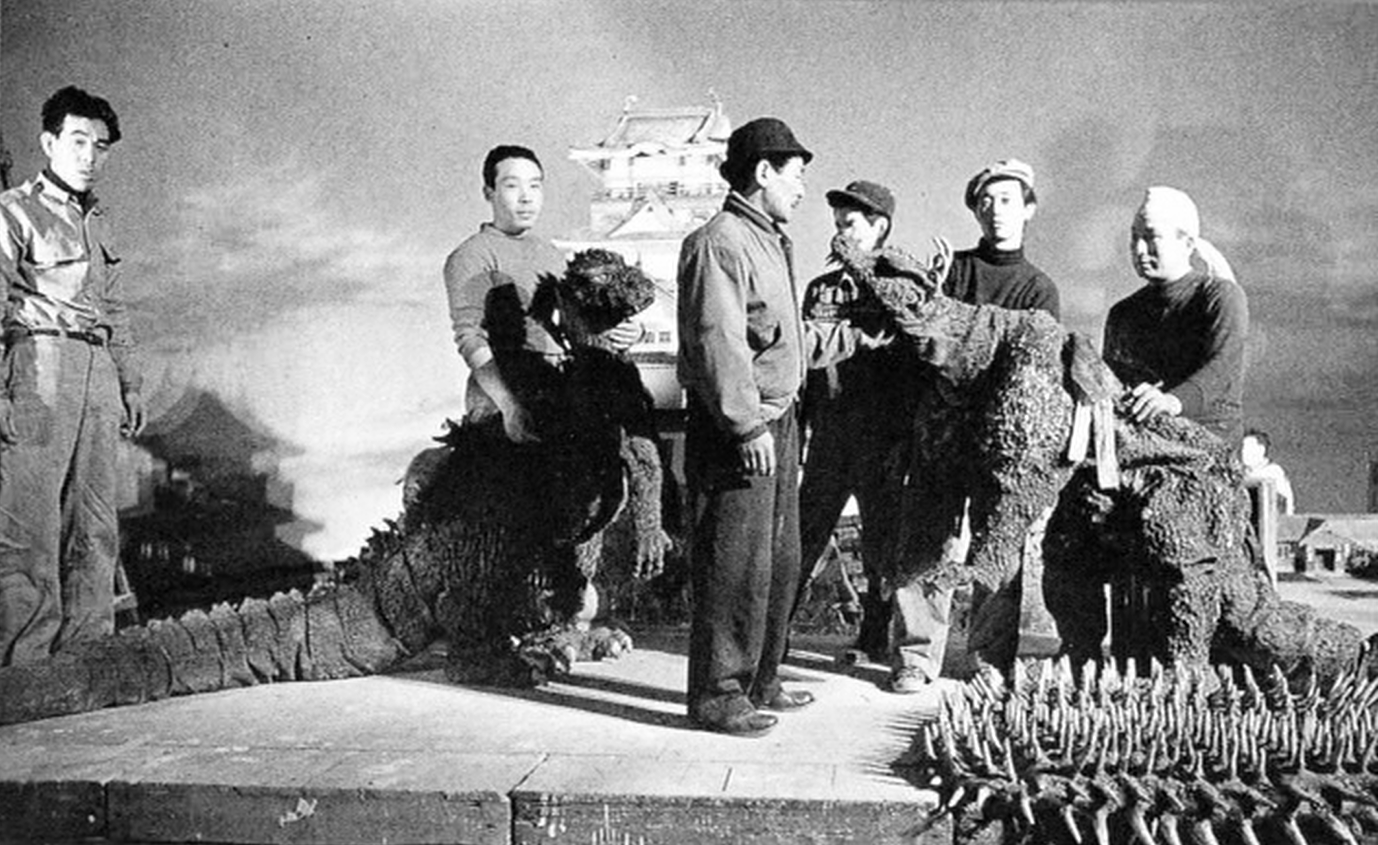
Suit fitting on the set of Godzilla Raids Again (1955), with Haruo Nakajima portraying Godzilla on the left, and Katsumi Tezuka as Anguirus's suit actor on the right. Visible in the background is a destructible scale model of Osaka Castle, scaled to fit the intended height of the two monsters.

Japanese tokusatsu movies and television shows often use daikaiju, or giant monster suits, as well as similar suits to represent Kyodai Heroes, giant robots, aliens and kaijin, humanoid monsters that are generally smaller than kaiju. Suitmation (スーツメーション, Sūtsumēshon; a portmanteau of "suit animation") is a filmmaking technique initially developed by Eiji Tsuburaya for use in Godzilla films and then used for his Ultra Series productions, a practice which survives to the present day. The suit actor, often moving through scale model scenery to give the impression of size, is filmed at a higher framerate to make them appear slower. In addition, the suit actor performs their movements slowly and deliberately to emulate a slow moving creature, and low camera angles are utilised to further provide a sense of scale.

Though suitmation proved to be a valuable method of portraying giant creatures and characters, some uses of the technology could prove to be a gruelling experience for the suit actors. On the set of Godzilla vs. Hedorah (1971), Kenpachiro Satsuma, who portrayed the titular main antagonist, Hedorah, suffered from a bout of appendicitis during production. Satsuma gave an interview before the diagnosis wearing part of the costume, causing a rumor that he wore the suit during the procedure.

=== Robots ===
Creature suits are commonly used to portray androids in film and television, including the pop-cultural icon Robot from Lost In Space, which was portrayed by stuntman Bob May. The 2018 remake of the series also featured a practical effects robot with suit actor Brian Steele wearing the suit. C-3PO of the Star Wars franchise was portrayed using a suit worn by Anthony Daniels. Other examples of robot creature suits include Marvin the Paranoid Android from The Hitchiker's Guide to the Galaxy, worn by David Learner in the television series and Warwick Davis in the 2005 film; and Mother from I Am Mother, which was designed by Edon Guraziu, built by Weta Workshop, portrayed by Luke Hawker, and based on realistic robot designs to be "100% believable".

The appearance of a robot suit on Russian state television channel Russia-24 sparked controversy when it was billed as a real robot, before being revealed as a £3,000 realistic costume.

== In popular culture ==
- The cartoon franchise Scooby-Doo often features villains who wear realistic creature suits in order to scare people away until they are trapped and unmasked by the protagonists.
- The Lego Minifigures feature the minifigures in different creature suits. They consist of Gorilla Suit Guy, Lizard Man, Chicken Suit Guy, Bumblebee Girl, Panda Guy, Piggy Guy, Unicorn Girl, Shark Suit Guy, Penguin Boy, Elephant Costume Girl, Dragon Suit Guy, Spider Suit Boy, Cat Costume Girl, Unicorn Guy, Giraffe Guy, Bear Costume Guy, Llama Costume Guy, Ladybug Girl, Pug Costume Guy, Green Dragon Costume, Raccoon Costume Fan, Reindeer Costume, Turkey Costume, Wolf Costume, T-Rex Costume Fan, Triceratops Costume Fan, and Pterodactyl Costume Fan.
- In DC Comics, Jonathan Crane, aka Scarecrow, dresses in a costume that greatly resembles a demonic living scarecrow.
- In the 2020 comedy film Secret Zoo, the main characters scheme to keep a zoo open by creating and wearing realistic creature suits of the zoo's animals.

== See also ==
- Prosthetic makeup
