= William May (artistic director) =

Australian artistic director, theatre producer and composer (1953–2009)

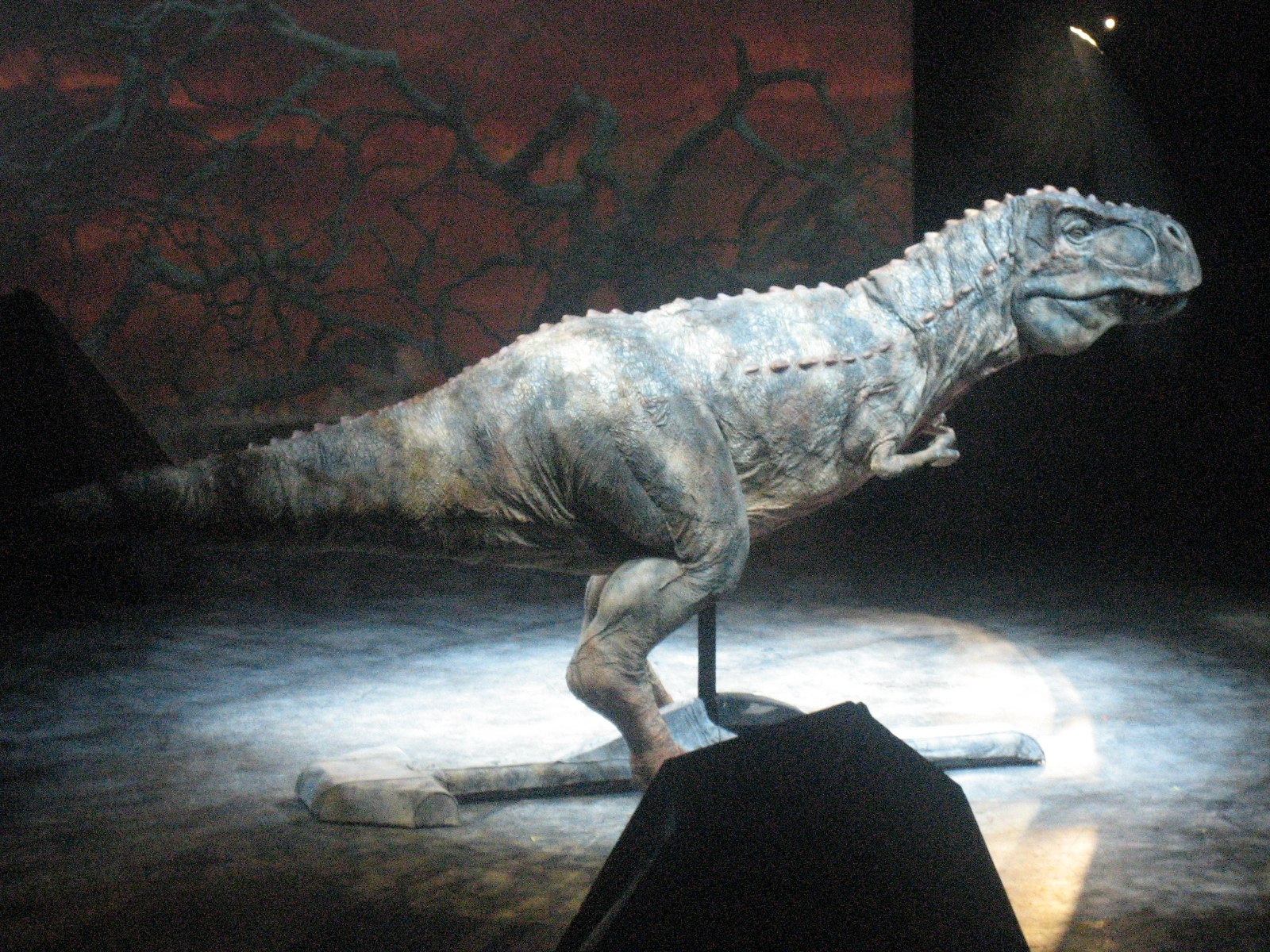
May helped to design dinosaurs featured in Walking with Dinosaurs – The Live Experience.

William H. "Billy" May (30 August 1953 – 31 December 2009) was an American-born Australian artistic director, theatre producer and composer. May was best known for creating the Walking with Dinosaurs – The Live Experience, an arena show based on the BBC documentary television mini-series, Walking with Dinosaurs. The production, which debuted in 2007 and features 15 lifelike dinosaurs designed by May, has been called "one of the largest and most acclaimed shows to come out of Australia."

== Biography ==
=== Early life ===
May was born on 30 August 1953, in Brooklyn, New York, United States. May earned a scholarship to Carnegie Hall to study dance when he was twelve years old. He next enrolled at the High School of Performing Arts, also on a scholarship. He toured with a number of acts while he was a teenager, including the Osmonds and Sonny and Cher.

=== Career ===
In 1972, at the age of 19, he moved to Australia to live with his life partner, producer Malcolm Cooke. The two became artistic and business partners as well, ultimately working on more than forty theatre productions in Australia, the United Kingdom and New York City. May worked from Australia to oversee international and Australian theatrical productions.

He also partnered with Cooke to manage the career of Australian singer Samantha Sang. May hired Barry Gibb from the Bee Gees to write and produce a single for Sang, which resulted in the 1977 international hit single, Emotion.

In 1983, May returned to New York City to produce the musical, Marilyn: An American Fable. As a result, May, who was just 24 years old in 1983, became the youngest producer on Broadway at the time.

May's other credits included The Hobbit; the 2002 theatrical production of The Lion, the Witch and the Wardrobe at the Arts Centre Melbourne; Boswell for the Defense, which starred actor Leo McKern as James Boswell; and the 1997 musical, Always. May wrote and composed the music, book and lyrics for Always, a musical focusing on the lives of Edward VII and Wallis Simpson. However, poor reviews caused Always, to close soon after its opening.

May suffered another professional setback after he sold his screenplay for a film to be called Skippy to Rupert Murdoch at 20th Century Fox. However, the screenplay was rejected by studio executive Barry Diller, who overruled Murdoch and cancelled the project.

=== Walking with Dinosaurs – The Live Experience ===
However, May found professional and commercial success when he created the 2007 live stage production of Walking with Dinosaurs – The Live Experience, based on the documentary of the same name which aired on the BBC and the Discovery Channel.

May was inspired to create the prehistoric live show after watching cranes constructing Southern Cross railway station in Melbourne during the night. May felt the cranes resembled dinosaurs, which served as the inspiration for the arena show.

May needed two years to create the lifelike dinosaurs, which needed to be both realistic and easily transportable for the tour. May hired approximately fifty people to create the dinosaurs using his designs.

He chose Sonny Tilders, one of the film and television industries' leading professionals in the field of animatronic puppetry, to head the development of the dinosaurs. May designed the fifteen life-size dinosaurs used in the production. Ten species of dinosaurs are included in the show, including the Liliensternus, Plateosaurus, Allosaurus, Stegosaurus, Utahraptor and Torosaurus. The largest dinosaur in the production, the Brachiosaurus, which most resembles the cranes which inspired the show, measures 56 feet long and 36 feet tall.

The live adaptation, which debuted in 2007, was called Walking with Dinosaurs – The Arena Spectacular in Australia, but was later marketed under the name, Walking with Dinosaurs – The Live Experience in North America and Europe.

Walking with Dinosaurs cost $20 million to create and was an instant commercial success. The Hollywood Reporter described Walking with Dinosaurs as "one of the largest and most acclaimed shows to come out of Australia."

According to Polstar, Walking with Dinosaurs was the best-selling non-musical touring production in North America in 2009. The production grossed $46.2 million and sold more than one million tickets throughout the United States and Canada leg of the tour.

As of early 2010, May's Walking with Dinosaurs – The Live Experience is still touring arenas and stadiums throughout North America and Europe.

=== Death ===
May died of pneumonia at St Vincent's Hospital in Melbourne, Australia, on 31 December 2009, at the age of 56. He was survived by his partner of 37 years, Malcolm Cooke. May's funeral was held at St Patrick's Cathedral, Melbourne.
