= Dinosaur suit =

Costume

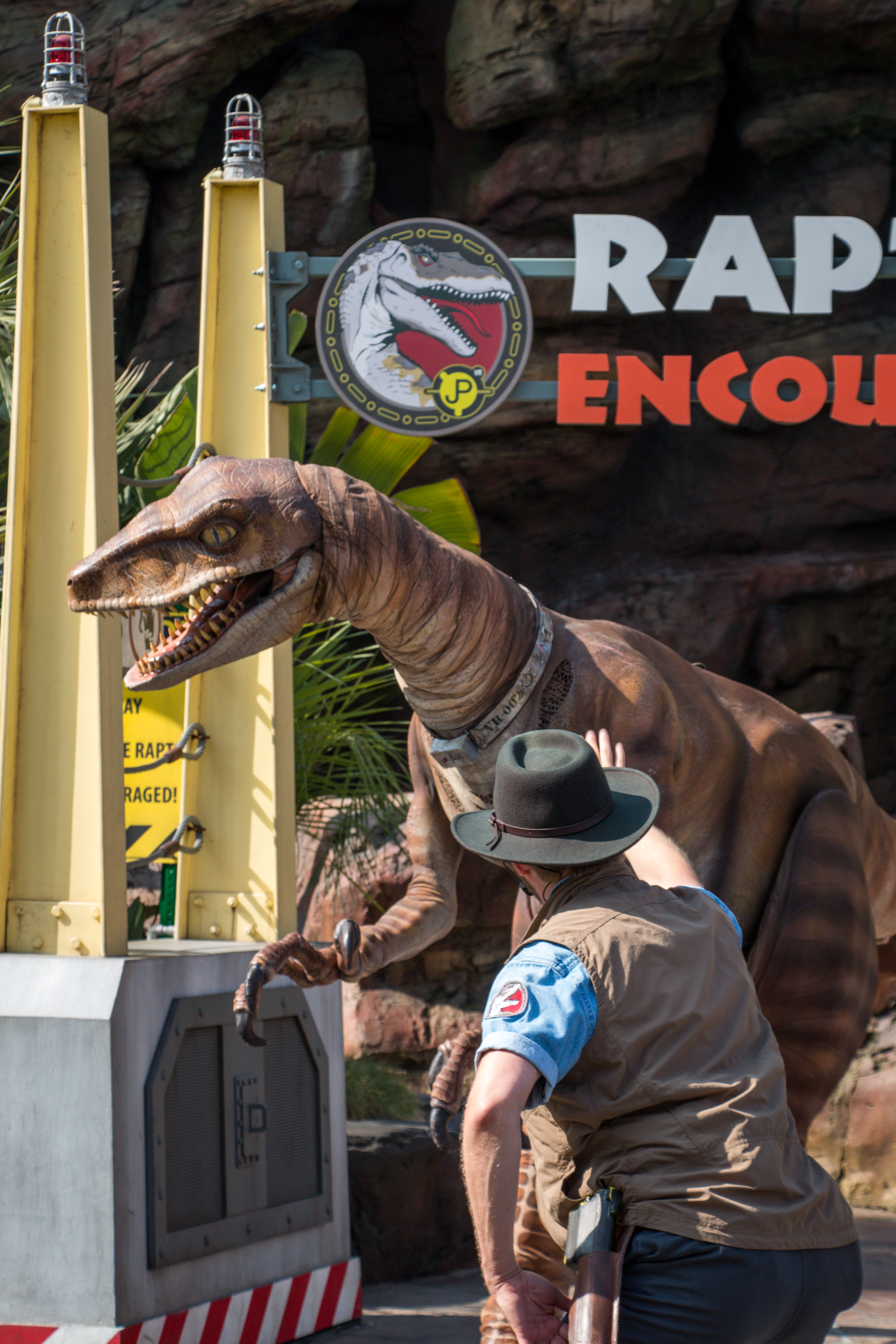
A velociraptor suit alongside a dinosaur "tamer" from Universal Studios Hollywood's "Raptor Encounter" attraction.

Dinosaur suits are a type of costumed character or creature suit resembling a dinosaur. Dinosaur suits are also called dinosaur costumes. Such costumes were used in film and television and as mascots for decades, reflecting dinosaurs' prominence in the arts and entertainment. Usually operators use two cable-pulled handles to control the motions. Realistic dinosaur suits also gained popularity for live shows following the success of Walking with Dinosaurs − The Arena Spectacular. An experienced performer can make lifelike movements with a dinosaur suit. They are also used in theme parks and in an educational context at various museums. Inflatable dinosaur suits have been used for pranks, gags, and protests.

== Film and television ==
Dinosaur suits were first used in early monster movies, such as Gorgo (1961), which featured a T-Rex like monster. They continued to be used in films such as Baby: Secret of the Lost Legend (1985) which used animatronic brontosaurus suits with radio-controlled heads, and in television series like Dinosaurs (1991), a sitcom with a family of dinosaurs.

The 1993 film, Jurassic Park, incorporated dinosaur suits to bring its Velociraptors to life.

In children's television, Barney, an anthropomorphic purple dinosaur, was used in the show Barney & Friends alongside other dinosaurs, becoming widely known in pop culture.

== Live action ==
Some sports teams have dinosaur mascots represented by costumes, such as Arsenal F.C., Toronto Raptors, Colorado Rockies, Calgary Dinos and NC Dinos.

For Walking with Dinosaurs − The Arena Spectacular, puppet-suits of dinosaurs such as the baby T-Rex and Utahraptors were created by Creature Technology Co. for use on stage alongside larger remote-controlled animatronics. These suits had the performer's legs visible, to make the leg shape more realistic. Feathers were later added to them due to recent discoveries about dinosaur plumage. Because of the show's ongoing popularity, these types of suits also became popular for live appearances, with and without the performer's visible legs, and including other types of suits such as two-person triceratops and stegosaurus costumes.

As part of their Jurassic Park attractions, Universal Studios created several realistic dinosaur suits for their theme parks, including Velociraptors and a life size adult Triceratops that was also used to advertise the movies. The dinosaur suits utilised in Universal studios appear to replicate the method used for the dinosaurs in the classic Jurassic Park films. They are capable of complex behaviours such as roaring, snapping, trying to eat the guests or even showing affection in ways such as rubbing their heads or noses on the guests.

Dinosaur suits created by the company Erth are used to teach students about dinosaurs at the Natural History Museum of Los Angeles County in the "Dinosaur Encounters" show, including a baby triceratops and baby T-Rex. The vocalizations of the suits are made by the performers themselves through a microphone and speaker. Other museums also began to use dinosaur suits as attractions, such as THEMUSEUM in Ontario.

In 2015, costume manufacturer Rubie's Costume Company developed a line of inflatable dinosaur costumes as a merchandise tie-in to Jurassic World. Rubie's T. rex costume, with a comically large wobbling head, gained popularity in pranks, visual gags, and as an internet meme. A large group of people wearing dinosaur suits marched on Washington in 2017 to protest President Donald Trump's defunding of national service programs.

== See also ==
- Creature suit
- Gorilla suit
- Bear suit
