= Bear suit =

Costumed character or creature suit

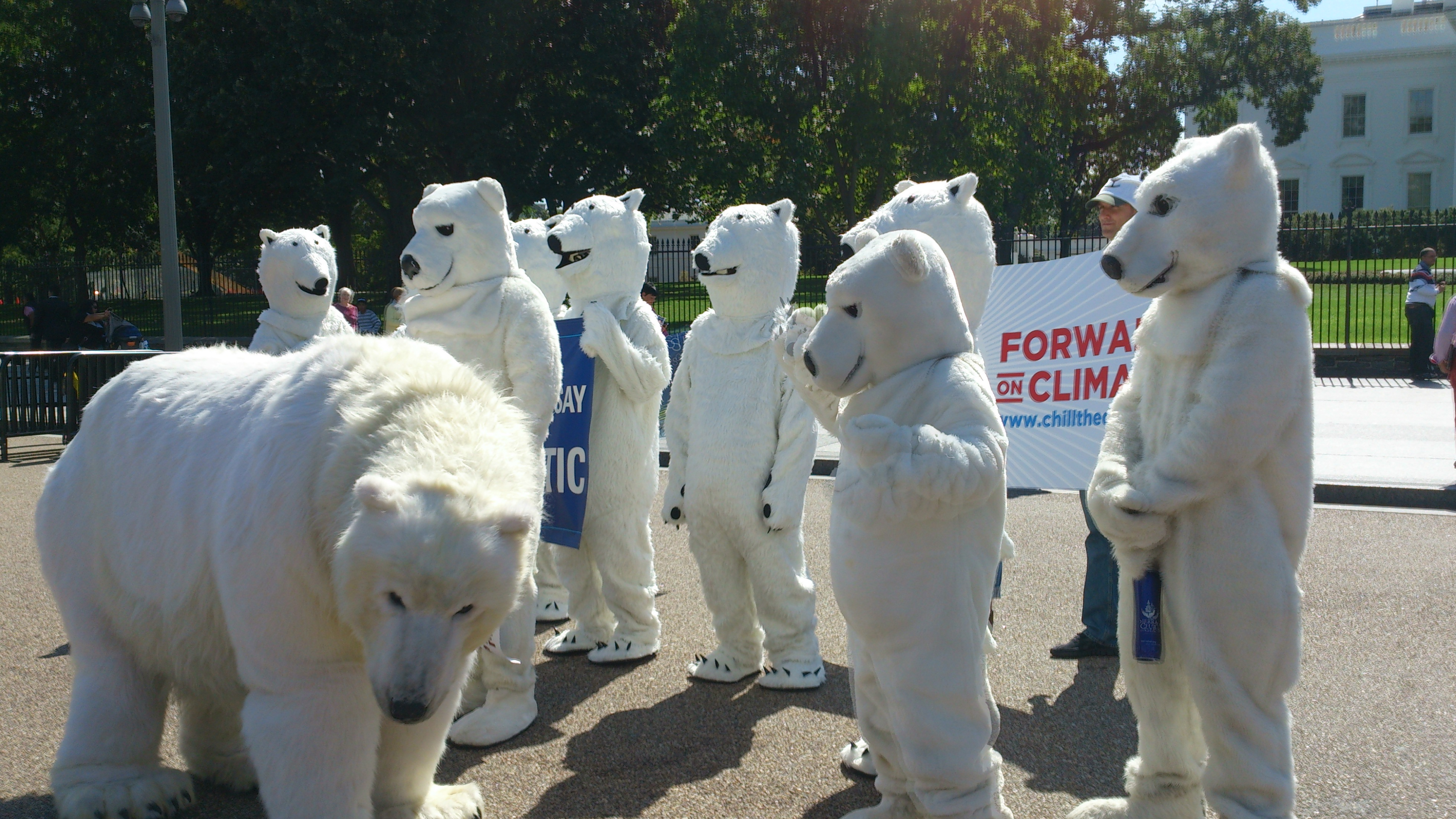
A group of polar bear suit-wearing Greenpeace activists protest global warming outside the White House. On the left side is a realistic two-person suit.

Bear suits are a type of costumed character or creature suit resembling a bear. The first bear suits worn by humans were used in shamanic ritual practices by native peoples. In the modern day, they are a popular choice of mascot, and both stylized and realistic bear suits are commonly used in film and on stage, due to the bear's prominent role in the arts and entertainment. Specific types of bear suits are also used in activism, such as polar bear suits to draw attention to the threat of global warming. Bear suits are also commonplace in the furry community.

== History ==
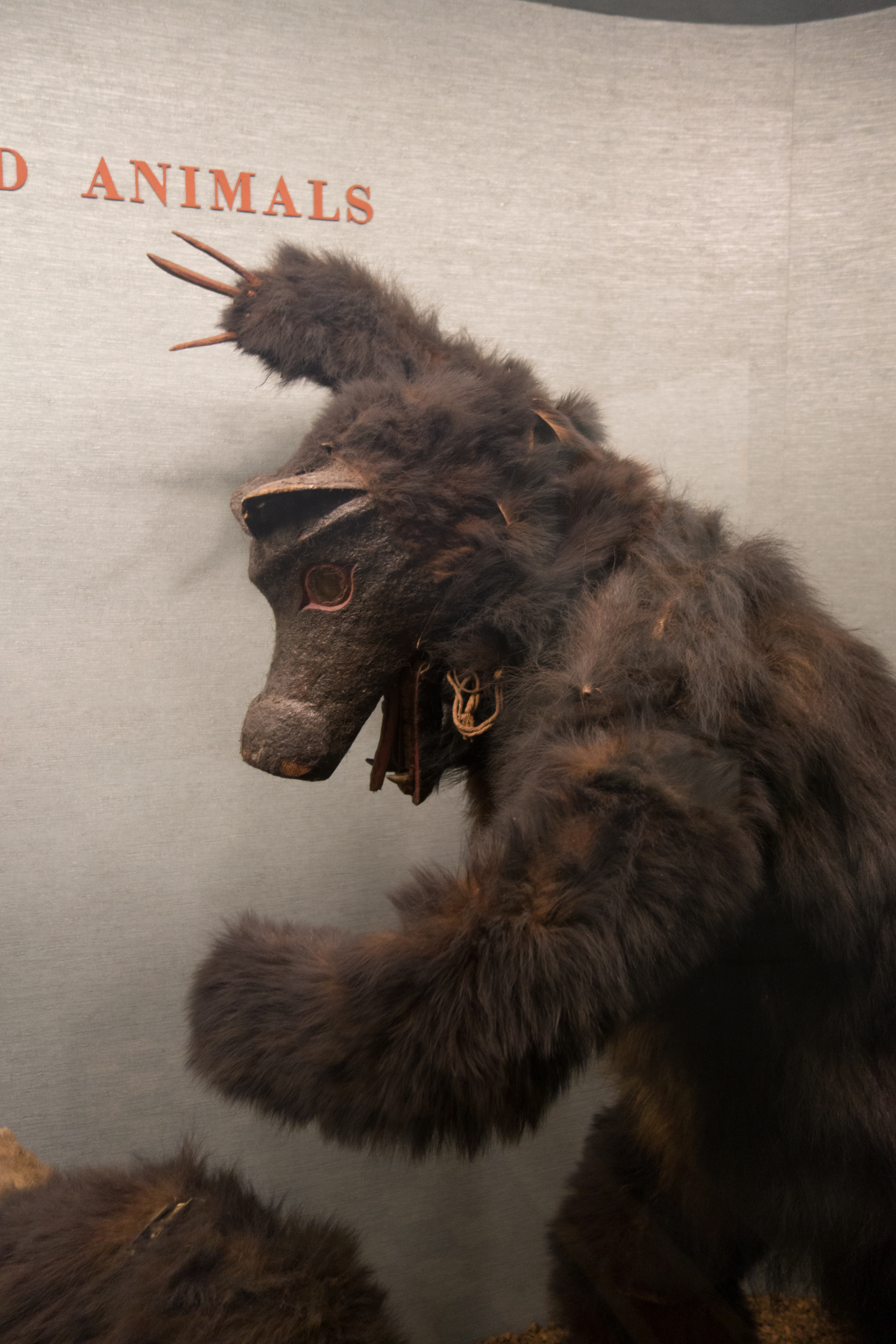
A ritual bear suit used by the Nuu-chah-nulth peoples, as seen in the American Museum of Natural History.

Masked bearskin costumes were used by shamans in ritual dances by native peoples of the Pacific Northwest, such as the Tlingit, alongside those of other animals.

In Romania, dancers wearing real bearskins are a pre-Christian tradition that is meant to drive away evil spirits.

== Modern use ==
Bear suits are common as mascots for sports teams, such as Cornell University's Touchdown the Bear, which replaced an actual bear cub that was used up until the 1930s.

Realistic and sometimes animatronic bear suits of all types are typically used in film, or as costumed characters. For the nature film Born in China, the filmmakers themselves were required to wear panda suits in order to get close to pandas that had never seen a human before.

In the Chessington World of Adventures amusement park, one show uses actors wearing animatronic panda suits created by Millennium FX.

Bear suits have also been used in science, as researchers used one to study goats' response to predators both within and outside populated areas, and to study the effects of the increasing presence of polar bears on muskoxen due to global warming. In the Wolong National Nature Reserve in China, keepers wear panda suits to interact with cubs and teach them to live in the wild without relying on humans.

== Activism ==
Polar bear suits have been used by environmental organizations such as Greenpeace to draw public attention to global warming and to campaigns against oil drilling in the Arctic. In 2012, Greenpeace launched its Save the Arctic campaign with activists in polar bear suits appearing in cities worldwide, including a protest in Moscow's Red Square.

A realistic two-person polar bear suit was created for the 2011 play Greenland by the Royal National Theatre, and was later purchased by Greenpeace for £4,000 via a donation campaign. Named Paula, it was used in short films and as a costumed character to draw public attention to global warming. In April 2013, Greenpeace used Paula in a demonstration in Washington, D.C., that passed the National Mall, the U.S. Capitol, and Lafayette Park near the White House.

In September 2008, Greenpeace collaborated with street artist Mark Jenkins on a series of sculptures installed around Washington, D.C. The figures were given polar bear heads and ragged clothing to convey a sense of displacement and homelessness in the face of global warming. Police treated one figure near the Columbia Heights station, a mannequin in a tattered flannel shirt and dirty pants posed as if rummaging through a trash can, as a suspicious package. The bomb squad cut it open, and Metro closed the station and used shuttle buses to move 218 people out of the area.

== In popular culture ==
Bear suits are used in the production of various children's television series, such as Bear in the Big Blue House. In Disneyland, the characters Kenai and Koda from Brother Bear (2003) are portrayed by performers in bear suits. The film Brigsby Bear (2017) revolves around a fictional fake children's television show featuring a performer in a bear suit, which the main character later wears in an attempt to create a movie.

A recurring segment in Late Show with David Letterman featured a "Guy in the Bear Suit" played by Donick Cary, who attempted to perform mundane tasks like hailing a cab for comedic effect.

The character of Smokey Bear is often portrayed by a bear mascot suit in order to spread awareness about wildfires.

== See also ==
- Costumed character
- Creature suit
- Dinosaur suit
- Gorilla suit
- Fursuit
