= Walking with Dinosaurs − The Arena Spectacular =

Entertainment event

VOA report about the Arena Spectacular

Walking with Dinosaurs − The Arena Spectacular was a live adaptation of the 1999 BBC television series Walking with Dinosaurs. The show premiered in 2007 and played its last show in 2019.

== Summary ==
=== Act I ===
The screen at the back of the stage showed Earth in the Triassic period, dominated by the Pangaea supercontinent. The camera zoomed towards the ground. The Triassic was introduced as a world of conifers and ferns, without flowering plants. The closest relative of humans was described as looking like "a cross between a mongoose and a lizard". The Triassic was a world of deserts and droughts. Huxley pointed out a nest of Plateosaurus eggs, explaining that every animal that lived on Pangaea laid eggs, an adaptation to the arid conditions. Two of the Plateosaurus eggs hatched, and before long a Liliensternus appeared, grabbing and eating one of the hatchlings. Huxley highlighted the success of the theropod body plan. Eventually the drought ended and rain fell. Small green plants began to grow on the rock on which the eggs sat. Huxley explained that an abundance of food helped early dinosaurs reach enormous sizes. At this point an adult Plateosaurus appeared. The dinosaur fed on the newly sprouted plants and Huxley highlighted its adaptations for the arid conditions of the Triassic. The Plateosaurus attended to its surviving hatchling, and fended off the Liliensternus twice. With the predator gone, three juvenile Plateosaurus emerged from the rock structure and roamed around the arena, before following the adult out.

After the dinosaurs left, Huxley introduced the concept of plate tectonics. He explained that at the end of the Triassic Pangaea began to break apart, leaving narrow seaways between the new lands. To illustrate this, the single rock structure in the middle of the arena began to break into three pieces. With the formation of new mountains and ocean currents, the climate changed, with greater amounts of rainfall encouraging a flourishing of vegetation. Horsetailed emerge around the edges of the arena, and trees grew from the central rock structures. The audience had now entered the Jurassic period.

Huxley spotted a theropod footprint on the ground, and explained how trace fossils could tell paleontologists lots about dinosaur behaviour. More footprints began to emerge, first showing the theropod walking, and then a different set of tracks, those of a herbivore (probably a sauropod). Eventually the theropod tracks caught up to those of the herbivore, implying an attack (accompanied by dinosaur sound effects). The footprints vanished, and a Stegosaurus emerged. Huxley hypothesised that the plates on its back were used for display to put off predators. An Allosaurus then emerged, promptly sticking its head into the horsetails, pulling out a lizard which it devoured. Not satisfied with this meal, the Allosaurus then began to attack the Stegosaurus, which stood its ground and fought back. The dinosaurs were interrupted by a lightning storm which triggered a forest fire. The horsetails and trees started to burn down, and the Stegosaurus made an exit. The fire was extinguished by the rain, and the plants regrew from the fertile soil. As this took place Huxley announced that the audience would be travelling further forward in time to the Late Jurassic.

Huxley pointed out that Allosaurus was still around at this point in time. A sub-adult Brachiosaurus emerged, having been separated from its herd. After Huxley explained the lifecycle of the Brachiosaurus, the Allosaurus prepared to attack the young dinosaur. Before it could get very far, the sub-adult's adult Brachiosaurus appeared on stage, easily fending away the smaller theropod. With the carnivore gone, two sauropods rubbed necks as a sign of their bond, before beginning to browse from the tall trees in the centre of the arena. As the two dinosaurs exited the stage, Huxley explained that the Late Jurassic was the peak of the age of dinosaurs, and that life would never again be this grand, but it would get a lot scarier.

=== Act II ===
The second half of the show begain with the continued break-up of the continents. Most of the central rocks now moved to the outskirts of the arena. The audience had now entered the Cretaceous Period. Huxley appeared, and explained that 30 million years had now passed, and that the Americas had split apart from Europe and Africa, forming the Atlantic Ocean. Only one group of reptiles could cross this gap, the pterosaurs, one of the largest being the Ornithocheirus. The giant pterosaur flew over a landscape inhabited by ceratopsians, and used warm updrafts from volcanic fissures to give it lift. Having left the volcanic landscape, the Ornithocheirus flew both day and night, caught fish on the wing, and survived a terrible storm. On arriving over a new land, the pterosaur flew over sauropods and a large theropod, before looking for somewhere to land. The Ornithocheirus quickly aborted this manoeuvre however with the appearance of a trio of Utahraptor. These pack-hunters approached the carcass of an unidentified ornithopod, possibly a young Iguanodon. The Utahraptor had a strict pecking order, and the weaker one was forced to wait its turn to eat. The raptors communicated with sound and started to investigate the audience, before returning to the carcass. Suddenly the raptors were startled by something, and began to run off. Just before exiting, the raptor who was lower on the pecking order, and hadn't been allowed to eat, snuck back to the dead ornithopod and grabbed a chunk of meat.

In the Late Cretaceous, the first flowers arrived, emerging along the edges of the arena. With them came the first pollinators, such as bees, wasps, moths and butterflies. Huxley explained that flowers evolved their bright colours and elegant petals as a means to attract these pollinators, in order to reproduce. Dinosaurs had also developed elaborate reproductive displays, as demonstrated by the enormous neck-frill and horns of Torosaurus, giving it the largest skull of any land animal. An old bull Torosaurus entered the arena, established to be the leader of a herd for many decades. A young bull arrived and challenged him for his position. After showing off to each other, the two dinosaurs fought, resulting in the old bull breaking one of his horns, surrendering his title to the young challenger. The older bull exited, and the younger male roared in victory, before depositing a pile of dung on the stage as the lights went down. Huxley explained how useful dinosaur dung was to paleontologists, and extracted a dung beetle from the pile, another modern species that emerged in the Mesozoic.

As India piled towards Asia, the collision caused huge volcanoes that began to erupt (the deccan traps), releasing in sulphureous plumes of smoke and ash. The temperature rose, an acid rain destroyed many of the more delicate plant species, which in turn triggered the extinction of some animals. The rock structures began to release smoke, and the flowers on the edges of the arena died down. Hundreds of species of plants and animals, both on land and in the sea, were revealed to be dying out. Meanwhile, the dinosaur arms race between predator and prey had reached new heights. An Ankylosaurus entered the stage, the most armoured animal of all time, with plated eye-lids and a 70kg tail-club. The Ankylosaurus sensed the Torosaurus which had remained on stage, and the two co-existed peacefully. Huxley revealed that only one dinosaur could pose a threat to the Ankylosaurus or Torosaurus, that being Tyrannosaurus. At this point a baby Tyrannosaurus entered. The young dinosaur began to harass the Ankylosaurus, narrowly missing being hit by its club tail on multiple occasions. It made things worse for itself by provoking the Torosaurus as well, and ended up being cornered at the edge of the stage by the two herbivores. The young Tyrannosaurus cries out, at which point its mother entered the stage. The two herbivores moved to face off against the predator, with the Ankylosaurus taking a swing at the carnivore's leg. Eventually the Ankylosaurus and then the Torosaurus left the stage, and the mother Tyrannosaurus reunited with her baby. Huxley began to explain that the success of some dinosaurs might have been due to parental care, at which point the mother lunged at him and roared, forcing him to run away, and hide behind one of the rock structures. After giving the dinosaurs time to roar at the audience, Huxley explained that the dinosaur's success was due to their versatility. The volcanoes began to erupt again, creating a deadly fog of poisonous gas. A comet, 6.5 miles wide, travelling at 20 miles per second, crashed into an area of shallow sea in what would one day be the Gulf of Mexico. The screen displayed the blast front heading towards the dinosaurs, with the Tyrannosaurus mother and baby roaring one last time before the stage turned black, representing the dust cloud created by the impact blocking out the sun. 65% of all life went extinct, including the giant dinosaurs.

Huxley repeated his monologue about dinosaur bones from the beginning of the show, and pointed out that the dinosaurs were extremely successful, ruling the earth for 170 million years. He then highlighted the similarities between the Utahraptor and modern birds, with arms that folded at the wrist. He explained that birds were the direct descendants of the dinosaurs, so the dinosaurs weren't really completely gone. The screen displayed a flock of flamingos and zoomed out to a view of modern-day earth (a reversal of the opening to the Triassic segment).

At the end of the show Huxley took a bow, and was joined by the baby Tyrannosaurus. As Huxley tried to leave the baby continued to show off to the audience and roar, before almost knocking Huxley over with its tail, snapping at him with its jaws, and running off.

== Production ==
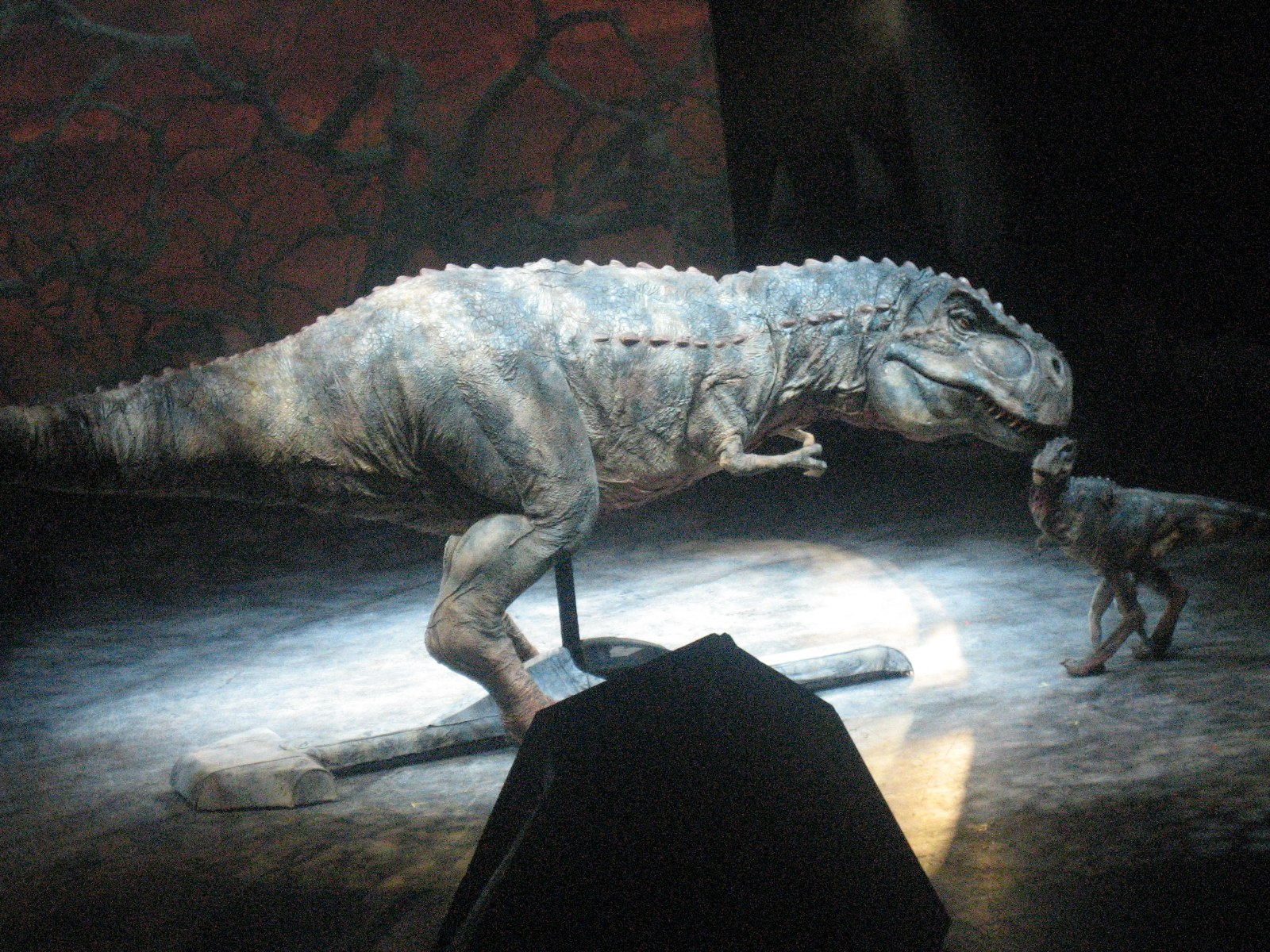
Tyrannosaurus in the arena

Walking with Dinosaurs − The Arena Spectacular was created by Australian live entertainment company Global Creatures, with puppet design by The Creature Technology Company. Artistic director William May is credited as the live show's creator. The production cost $20 million to stage and used puppetry, suits, and animatronics to create 16 Mesozoic era creatures representing 10 species. Each large dinosaur weighs several tons, and is operated by two "voodoo puppeteers" and a driver beneath the dinosaur who also monitors the hydraulics and batteries. The smaller dinosaurs (marked by an *) are suits operated by the person in it, each weighing from 20–30 kg (44-66 lbs). There are six puppeteers for these suits, which only have side views. The nine prehistoric creatures featured are:

- Allosaurus
- Ankylosaurus
- Brachiosaurus (1 adult, 1 adolescent)
- Liliensternus*
- Ornithocheirus also appeared as an animatronic in earlier versions of the tour, before being replaced with a CGI video sequence
- Plateosaurus (1 adult, 3 hatchlings)
- Stegosaurus
- Torosaurus (2x)
- Tyrannosaurus (1 adult, 1 juvenile*)
- Utahraptor (3x)*

There was also the carcass of an ornithopod and a video sequence about the Ornithocheirus. Some of the dinosaurs initially did not have feathers, but they were later added after new research showed dinosaurs possessed plumage. This also necessitated rewrites of the script, which were added to later iterations of the show as well as improvements in the animatronics, making them more responsive to puppeteers and giving them the ability to "eat" food and spray water vapor as "breath".

== Tours ==
Walking with Dinosaurs − The Arena Spectacular originated in Australia in January 2007 (originally as Walking with Dinosaurs: The Live Experience), and toured North America in 2007–10, Europe in 2010, and returned to North America until 2011. In 2009, the live show rebranded from The Live Experience to The Arena Spectacular. It toured Asia beginning in December 2010, visited New Zealand in 2011, United Kingdom, Germany, Ireland, Norway, Sweden, Denmark, Finland, and the Netherlands in 2012, and UK in 2018. The last show took place in Taiwan on 22nd December 2019, at the Taipei Arena.

== Reception ==
Elliot Wagland from Huffington Post UK called the show "an enchanting way to spend an afternoon", saying that it "stunned" his son into silence.

== In other media ==
=== Promotion ===
The soundtrack of the show, composed by James Seymour Brett, was first released by ABC Classics in 2007.

In the United Kingdom, the British tabloid newspaper The Sun, released Walking with Dinosaurs: The Making of the Live Experience on DVD for free, when the show was touring the country in June 2009. In addition to The Making of the Live Experience, the original 1999 series and follow-up series, Walking with Beasts, were also distributed by The Sun.

When the show was touring, various forms of merchandise were made, such as toys, cups, clothes and posters.

=== Television shows ===
In 2009, three of the animatronic dinosaurs appeared on Top Gear series 13, episode 6.

While in the United States, the adaptation appeared on CSI: Crime Scene Investigation season 11 episode 6.

The Arena Spectacular also appeared on The Ellen DeGeneres Show season 12, episode 4.
