= Walking with Dinosaurs =

1999 British television documentary series

- Cover of a 2004 UK DVD release
- Genre: Nature documentary Docudrama
- Created by: Tim Haines; Susan Spindler
- Directed by: Tim Haines; Jasper James
- Creative director: Mike Milne
- Narrated by: Kenneth Branagh; Avery Brooks (US); Ben Stiller (Prehistoric Planet)
- Composer: Ben Bartlett
- Country of origin: United Kingdom
- Original language: English
- No. of episodes: 6 (+3 special)

Production
- Executive producer: John Lynch
- Producers: Tim Haines; Jasper James
- Cinematography: John Howarth; Michael Pitts
- Editor: Andrew Wilks
- Running time: 30 minutes
- Production company: BBC Science Unit
- Budget: £6.1 million

Original release
- Network: BBC One
- Release: 4 October – 8 November 1999

Walking with Dinosaurs is a 1999 six-part nature documentary television miniseries created by Tim Haines and produced by the BBC Science Unit, the Discovery Channel and BBC Worldwide, in association with TV Asahi, ProSieben and France 3. Envisioned as the first "Natural History of Dinosaurs", Walking with Dinosaurs depicts dinosaurs and other Mesozoic animals as living animals in the style of a traditional nature documentary. The series first aired on the BBC in the United Kingdom in 1999 with narration by Kenneth Branagh. The series was subsequently aired in North America on the Discovery Channel in 2000, with Avery Brooks replacing Branagh.

Walking with Dinosaurs recreated extinct species through the combined use of computer-generated imagery and animatronics that were incorporated with live action footage shot at various locations, the techniques being inspired by the film Jurassic Park (1993). At a cost of £6.1 million (US$9.9 million), Walking with Dinosaurs cost over £37,654 (US$61,112) per minute to produce, making it the most expensive documentary series per minute ever made. The visual effects of the series were initially believed to be far too expensive to produce, but innovative techniques by the award-winning graphics company Framestore made it possible to bring down costs sufficiently to produce the three-hour series.

With 15 million people viewing the first airing of the first episode, Walking with Dinosaurs was by far the most watched science programme in British television during the 20th century. The series received critical acclaim and won numerous awards, including two BAFTA Awards, three Emmy Awards and a Peabody Award. Most scientists applauded Walking with Dinosaurs for its use of scientific research and for its portrayal of dinosaurs as animals and not movie monsters. Some scientific criticism was levelled at the narration not making clear what was speculation and what was not, and a handful of specific scientific errors.

The success of Walking with Dinosaurs spawned an entirely new genre of documentaries that similarly recreated past life with computer graphics and were made in the style of traditional nature documentaries. It also led to the creation of an entire media franchise of similar sequel documentary series, the Walking with... franchise produced by the BBC Studios Science Unit, which included Walking with Beasts (2001), Walking with Cavemen (2003), Sea Monsters (2003) and Walking with Monsters (2005). The series was accompanied by companion books and an innovative companion website. Additionally, Walking with Dinosaurs inspired the creation of exhibitions, the live theatrical show Walking with Dinosaurs − The Arena Spectacular, video games, and a 2013 film adaptation. In 2024, the BBC and PBS announced that a new "reimagined" Walking with Dinosaurs series was in production. The 2025 series began airing on BBC from 25 May 2025. Along with Jurassic Park, Walking with Dinosaurs is often cited as among the most influential media depictions of dinosaurs.

== Premise ==
Envisioned as the first "Natural History of Dinosaurs" and a series that would provide viewers with "a window into a lost world", Walking with Dinosaurs explores life in the Mesozoic era, particularly dinosaurs, in the format of a traditional nature documentary.

== Production ==
=== Background and concept ===
Walking with Dinosaurs was the brainchild of Tim Haines, who came with the idea in 1996 while he was working as a science television producer at the BBC. Then-head of BBC Science Jana Bennett had at the time started a policy of encouraging producers to pitch possible future landmark series, with the goal of increasing the science output of the BBC and raising the bar of science programming. Bennett had mainly asked for suggestions for series on geology, medicine and natural history. The idea for Walking with Dinosaurs was devised in the aftermath of the release of the film Jurassic Park in 1993, which had set a new benchmark for dinosaur entertainment. Initially, Haines idea revolved around a history of palaeontology with some reconstructions but this was deemed to not be ambitious enough. Shortly thereafter, he devised the idea of a dinosaur series made with the look and feel of a natural history programme.

Haines suggested that the same techniques employed in the production of Jurassic Park could be used to create a series of nature documentary programmes. According to Haines, the aim of Walking with Dinosaurs was to "create an immersive experience that was both spectacular and informative". Haines investigated the costs that would be involved in the project. He first initially approached Industrial Light & Magic (ILM), the company responsible for creating the visual effects in Jurassic Park, which projected a cost of $10,000 per second of dinosaur footage, far too expensive for a television series. Though Jurassic Park had only nine minutes of dinosaur footage, the series envisioned by Haines would require three hours. As a result, Haines initially changed his idea to the programme mainly consisting of footage of plants, insects and landscapes with dinosaurs appearing only occasionally.

The concept for the series changed back to frequent CGI creatures after Haines spoke with the UK-based graphics company Framestore. Framestore CFC had previously won Emmy Awards for their work on films such as Alice in Wonderland (1999) and miniseries such as Gulliver's Travels (1996). The head of Framestore, Mike Milne, at first turned down the project owing to its projected cost but later accepted since he realised that he would later regret it if another company took it up. Milne understood the concept of the programme and was able to bring down the cost of the animation considerably through flexibility and imagination. With Milne's assurance that making the programme would be possible, Haines pitched the idea to Bennett as a 6-episode series of 30-minute episodes and he called it Walking with Dinosaurs, at this time only intended to be a working title and deriving from Haines misremembering the title of the 1990 film Dances with Wolves.

=== Pilot episode and funding ===
Screenshot from the 1997 Walking with Dinosaurs pilot episode, showing Cetiosaurus with erect necks, which did not appear in the finished series.

The BBC liked the concept of Walking with Dinosaurs but were nervous whether a series of its scale was actually achievable. After also pitching the idea to BBC Worldwide, Haines was granted £100,000 (US$132,330) to produce a short Pilot Episode. In the spring of 1997, Haines, accompanied by a single cameraman, travelled to a national park near Paphos in Cyprus to shoot footage for the pilot. Milne then gathered a small team to produce models and animations. The resulting proof-of-concept pilot, finished by the summer of 1997, was six minutes long. The only consultant so far brought in for the project was the palaeontologist David Martill, who offered his services on the pilot for free if he could then stay on as a consultant should the pilot succeed and a series be made.

The pilot episode was marine-themed, revolving around a beached giant pliosaur, and based on the fossils of the Jurassic Oxford Clay in England (a setting later used for the episode Cruel Sea), a setting suggested by Martill. After concerns that the marine episode might not have enough "superstar" animals, Martill suggested the inclusion of the theropod dinosaur Eustreptospondylus. One of the major differences between the pilot and the later series was that, while the pilot included partial x-rays of the inner workings of the animals so that they could be better explained, in the later series this was abandoned in favour of a more standard "natural history" aesthetic. In addition to the pilot, Framestore also produced stills and a shorter trailer with a group of plesiosaurs hunting fish to sell the idea of Walking with Dinosaurs.

There was already considerable interest in the series by the time the pilot was shown, owing to the trailer and stills produced by Framestore. Jana Bennett also championed the idea of the series to both Michael Jackson, controller of BBC One, and Mike Quattrone of the Discovery Channel. The pilot was then enough to persuade the BBC, BBC Worldwide, and the Discovery Channel to fund the production of the series. Approximately a third of the series' budget came from BBC One, a third from the Discovery Channel, and a third from BBC Worldwide. There were also major investments from TV Asahi in Japan and ProSieben in Germany.

Walking with Dinosaurs was considered a high-risk production, due to being highly expensive as well as using "Hollywood technology" to educate rather than just entertain. It was billed during production as one of the most ambitious series ever produced. In total, Walking with Dinosaurs cost £6.1 million (US$9.9 million) to make. It cost over £37,654 (US$61,112) per minute to produce, making it the most expensive documentary series per minute ever made.

Together with Haines, the series was also created by the acclaimed programme maker Susan Spindler, who had previously worked on the BBC series The Human Body. The team grew to encompass producer Jasper James (who produced and directed the third and fourth episodes and also directed the sixth; Haines handled the rest), production manager Alison Woolnough and executive producer John Lynch.

=== Pre-production and filming ===
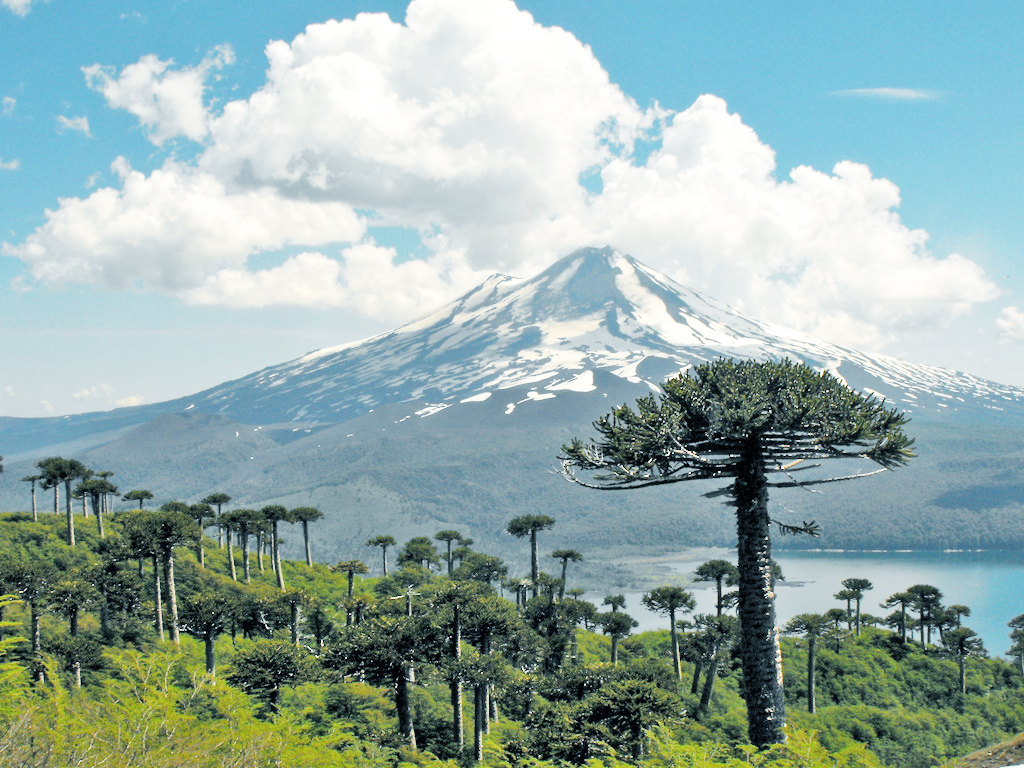
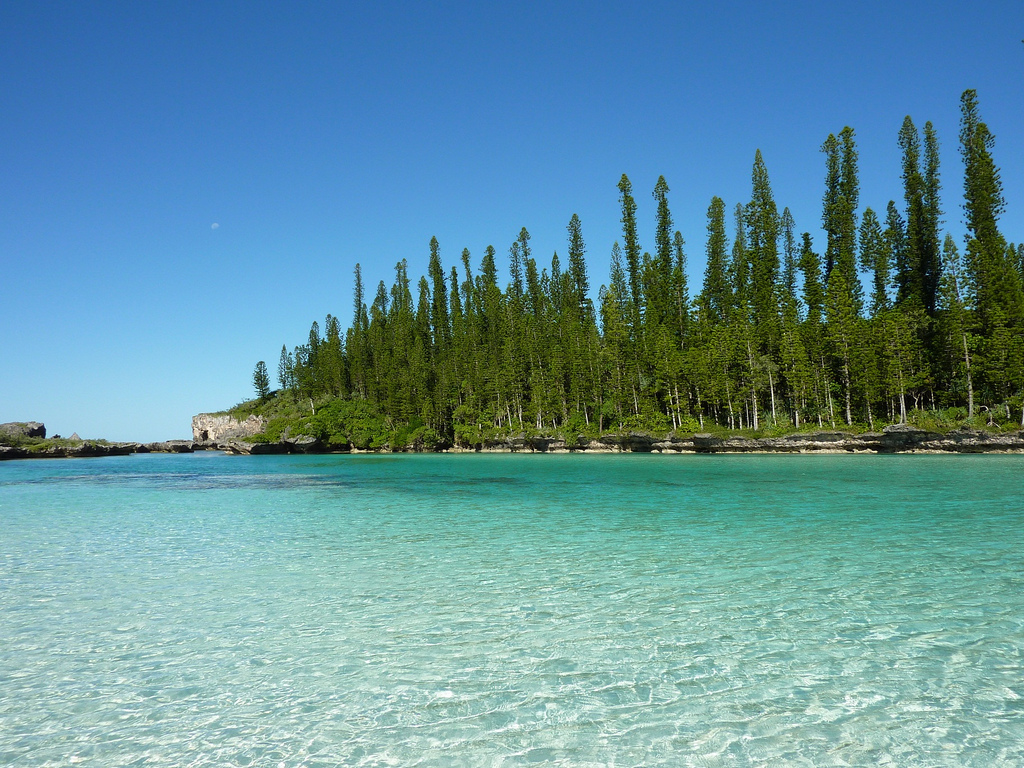
Conguillío National Park in Chile (top) and the Isle of Pines in New Caledonia (bottom) were among the filming locations for Walking with Dinosaurs

Haines spent two years speaking with scientists and reading both primary and secondary palaeontological sources to create the stories for Walking with Dinosaurs. Although the goal was to make the programme feel as if it was just relaying natural events without intervention, as actual nature documentaries, Walking with Dinosaurs required Haines to plot out narratives and create storyboards.

Production of Walking with Dinosaurs took 18 months. It was essential to the vision of Walking with Dinosaurs that the age of the dinosaurs be represented as accurately as possible based on current scientific understanding. In addition to Haines's own research, the production team for the first six months devoted all their time to research and carefully chose particular moments during the Mesozoic that were most well studied and well understood by scientists, and which would be representative of the era and showcase interesting animals. In addition to the producers doing their own research, over a hundred experts were consulted for every aspect of the series.

Slowly, the production team focused in on animals about whom sufficient information was known to create larger narratives. As an example, Coelophysis was selected for New Blood (the first episode) because it was a typical early dinosaur which scientists knew a lot about. Since the series also aimed to showcase the environment and other animals around the "star" dinosaurs, Coelophysis also presented an opportunity since it had been found at Ghost Ranch, New Mexico, one of the world's richest fossil beds. The behaviour of the animals depicted was primarily based on fossil evidence when possible (such as bite marks and fossil gut contents) and on behaviours in modern animals. Sometimes, behaviour was just reasoned guesses. For instance, the small pterosaur Anurognathus is shown in Time of the Titans (the second episode) to use the massive sauropod Diplodocus as a feeding platform to hunt insects. This was based on certain modern birds; there is no evidence of such behaviour in pterosaurs and it would be difficult to prove with fossil evidence.

In the summer of 1997 and in the winter of 1998, Haines and fellow producer Jasper James took a small crew of eight people to travel around the world to places where ancient plant life reminiscent of plants during the Mesozoic still existed—locations that could be used as backdrops for the series. Of particular importance was an absence of grass, which at the time was believed to not have existed during the Mesozoic. Filming took several weeks and locations included the Labyrinth in Tasmania, the beech gap in the South Island of New Zealand, the redwood forests of California, the araucaria forests in New Caledonia and southern Chile, and the Bahamas. Shooting at a single location usually lasted for about four weeks. New Caledonia was particularly difficult to shoot in since the French Army were doing exercises there simultaneously and the film crew kept bumping into soldiers and tanks.

=== Special effects ===
==== Computer graphics ====
Iguanodon as portrayed in Walking with Dinosaurs using computer graphics

Mike Milne and Framestore CFC, consisting of fifteen designers, began working on animating the dinosaurs at the same time as Haines and James were shooting footage for the series. Production of several hours of high-quality photoreal animation had never been done before, not even for feature films. The process of making the computer models began with creating clay maquettes, highly detailed small-scale physical models. Several palaeontologists were consulted during the process of making the maquettes. In addition to David Martill, the consultants of Walking with Dinosaurs included, among others, Kent Stevens, Thomas R. Holtz Jr., David Norman, David Unwin, Ken Carpenter, Jo Wright and Michael J. Benton. At times, details changed during production. For instance, the sauropod necks of Walking with Dinosaurs were at first fully erect before being altered on the advice of the sauropod neck expert Kent Stevens. In September 1998, Milne held a talk at the 46th Symposium on Vertebrate Palaeontology and Comparative Anatomy (SVPCA) at the University of Bournemouth, showcasing early renderings from the pilot and the series and gathering feedback from the palaeontologists in attendance.

After the maquettes were completed, Framestore CFC scanned them into their computers using both a high-resolution laser and a set of software tools developed together with Soho-CyberScan specifically for Walking with Dinosaurs. The models were then imported into Softimage 3D, where they could be digitally manipulated and animated. The animations were made by hand one frame at a time, an extremely time-consuming process, since it quickly became evident that any other method would have resulted in unconvincing animation. Since no one had ever seen a moving non-avian dinosaur, the animators based their animations both on footage of living animals, particularly elephants, and on information provided by palaeontologists. Palaeontologists provided information on the dynamics of dinosaur muscles, tendons and joints. In numerous cases, the animals in Walking with Dinosaurs had never before been animated with this level of scientific rigour. Many movements, such as the movement of pterosaurs on the ground, were educated guesses made based on scientific advice.

The textures for the models were created through a process of science-based guessing, deriving from the inferred life behaviour of the animals, their diet and their size (larger animals in real life tend to have duller colours). The digital artist Daren Horley was responsible for creating the textures and patterns of the animals and during production was sent actual fossil examples of dinosaur skin impressions. Despite the fossils available, Horley found that in some cases there had to be some informed compromise between strict accuracy and what looked best on screen; the scales of some species were too small to be visible on television screens.

The CGI shots were rendered by Framestore using eight twin-processor NT boxes, at times augmented with the SGI workstations (single R10K processors) of the animators. The computer effects for the first episode took around a year to make, although afterwards it was possible to speed the process up considerably—the five other episodes together took only six months. Initially, Framestore produced 24 different computer-generated animals, but, as the concept of the series grew, they had made 40 different species by the end of production. Compositing—adding the CGI together with the live footage—was done using five Quantel Henrys and five Discreet Logic Infernos.

==== Animatronics ====
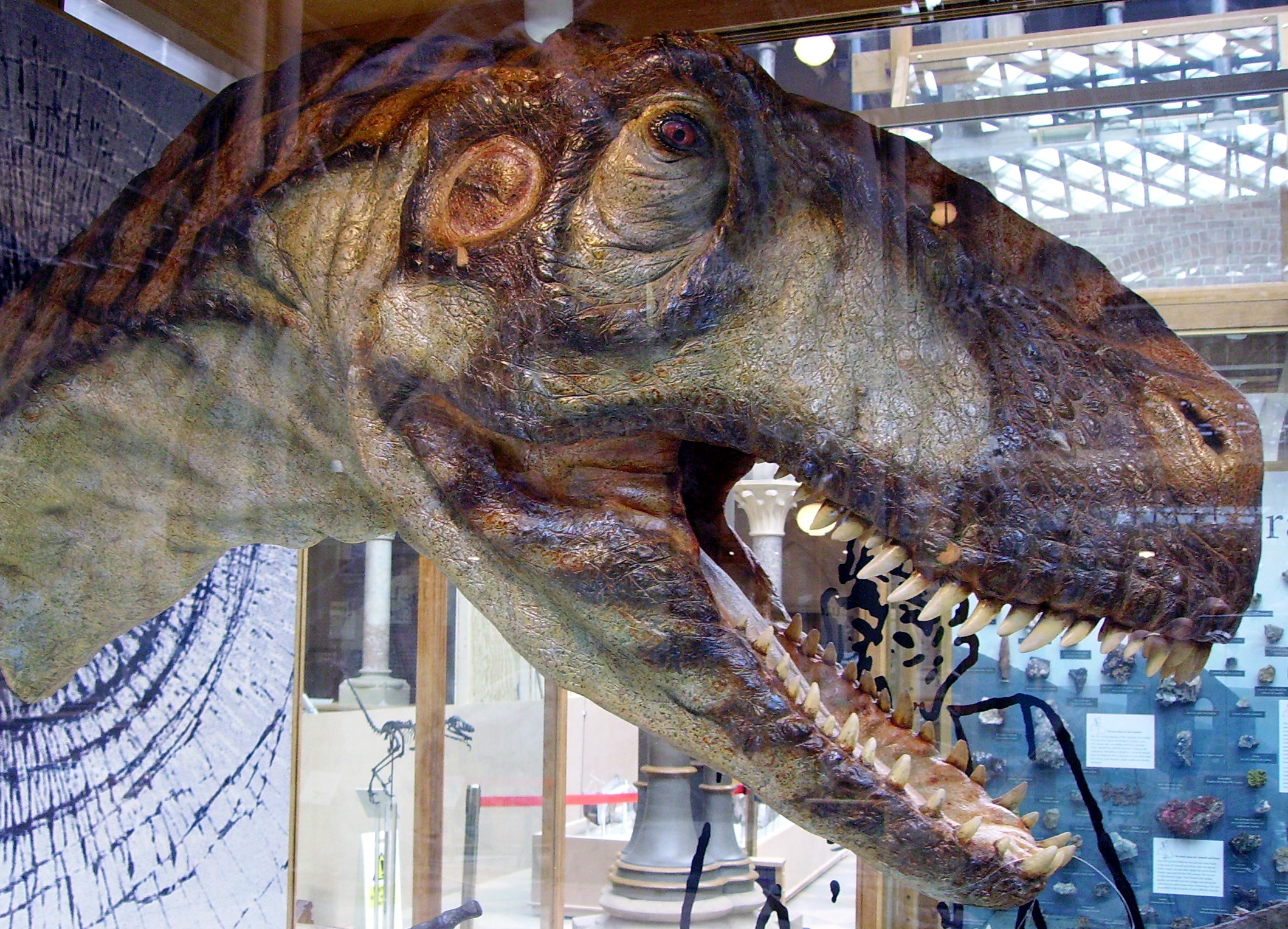
Eustreptospondylus puppet head used in Walking with Dinosaurs

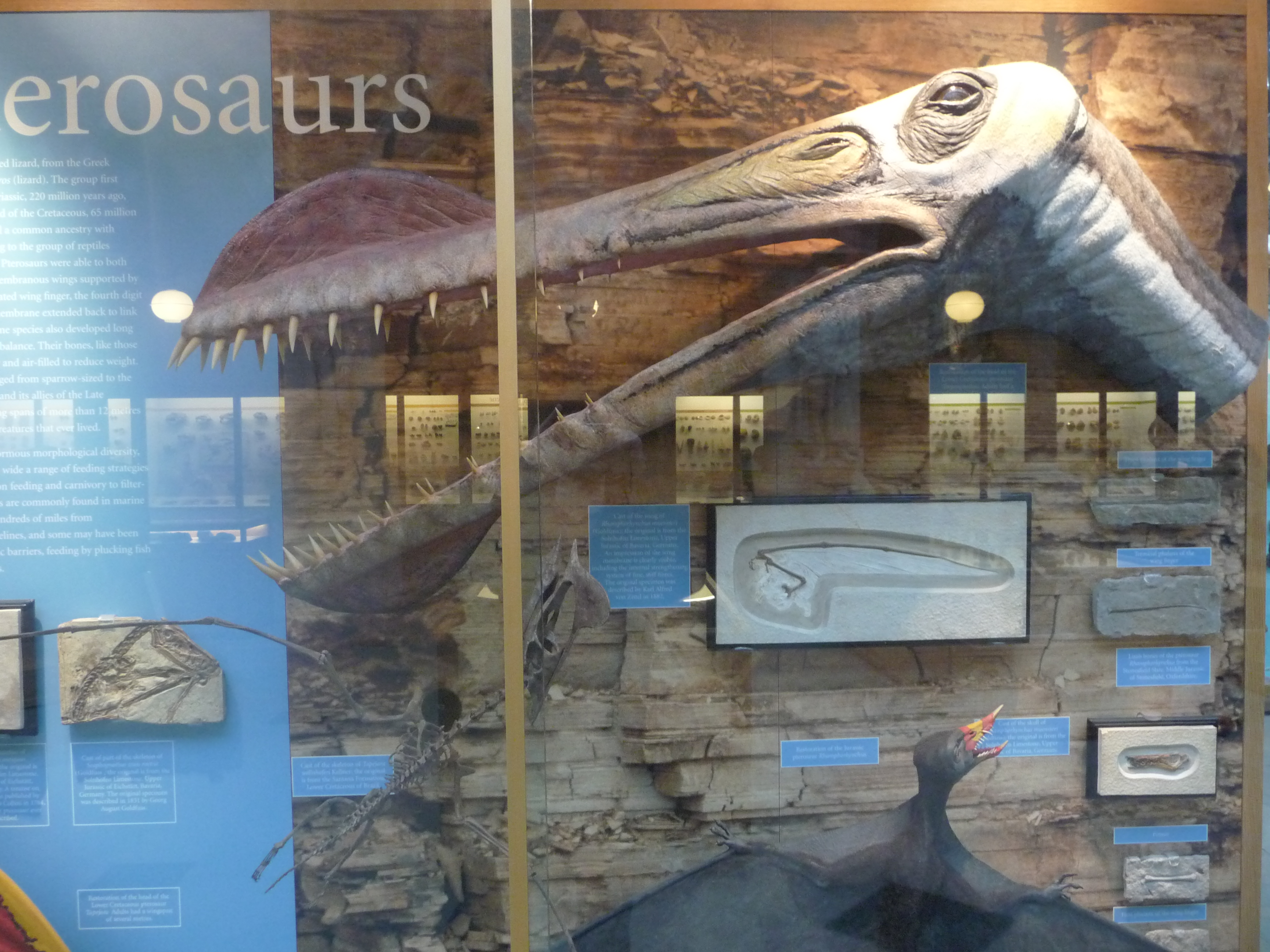
Ornithocheirus puppet head used in Walking with Dinosaurs

Though most of the animal shots in Walking with Dinosaurs are CGI, the series also made extensive use of animatronics and puppets. Haines explained in behind-the-scenes material that animatronics, despite advances in CGI, still played an important role, particularly in close-up shots: "The computer can fool the eye making a dinosaur run through a puddle and splashing but if you want a close-up of him dipping his nose into water and moving it back and forth, a computer-generated nose wouldn't look right."

The animatronics and puppets of Walking with Dinosaurs were made by the special effects company Crawley Creatures. Over 80 animatronic models were made for the series, mostly for close-ups of heads or other body parts. In some cases full body versions were made, mostly for corpses but also for some animals, such as Ophthalmosaurus. The greatest challenge for the artist at Crawley Creatures was working against time, since they only had six weeks between location shoots to put together animatronics and puppets for the next episode. The most challenging animal to model was the large pterosaur Ornithocheirus, which had to be able to work in a variety of positions as well as being extremely lightweight for transportation.

After filming, several of the models used in Walking with Dinosaurs, including those of Ophthalmosaurus, Ornithocheirus and Koolasuchus, were given to David Martill and then used by him for educational purposes at the University of Portsmouth. The Ophthalmosaurus model, having been dragged through water, had to be repaired and repainted and is today displayed for the public; the Ornithocheirus and Koolasuchus models were later sold. Numerous models also made their way to the Oxford University Museum of Natural History due to an association between Crawley Creatures and the museum.

=== Music ===
Ben Bartlett composed the score for Walking with Dinosaurs. He was then working with the BBC, having produced some station ident themes for BBC Radio 3. Bartlett was encouraged to accept the duties of composing the series' music at the behest of Haines and James. Bartlett wrote different leitmotifs in separate styles for each episode, citing the different themes and settings presented in each episode as inspiration, elaborating: "I tried to create a different sound world for each episode of Walking With Dinosaurs. That was easy, as they all had different moods. The first episode is all about heat and bloodlust, parched deserts and so on, while the second one was pastoral, peaceful, and beautiful, about dinosaurs living in symbiosis with the forests. And so on." The process of creating the score was that Bartlett would first watch the unscored episodes together with the directors, discussing with them possible music, and then write the music and produce a sample for approval. At times this was difficult, since the production of the computer graphics fell behind and some scenes were not finished in time for the recording sessions.

The recording process took place at Angel Recording Studios in Islington, with four sessions scattered over the early months of 1999. The score was recorded by the BBC Concert Orchestra. During these sessions, Bartlett admitted to being enriched with experience by the task, stating: "It was the biggest orchestral endeavour I've ever undertaken, and I learnt so much from the first session. Practical things, like handing out the parts to the players before the session, numbering pages... tiny logistical things that can really screw up a session." The BBC were impressed early on with the soundtrack and requested Bartlett and the orchestra to also produce tracks for a CD of the soundtrack released by BBC Records. The soundtrack was rereleased in a digital version for the 25th anniversary of the series in 2024, with three additional tracks covering material composed for The Ballad of Big Al.

== Episodes ==
=== Walking with Dinosaurs (1999) ===
BBC One aired the series weekly on Monday nights, with regular repeats the following Sunday. In 2010, the series was repeated on BBC Three in omnibus format, as three-hour-long episodes.

No.	Title	Time period and location	Directed by	Original release date	U.K. viewers (millions)
1	"New Blood"	Arizona, 220 mya (Late Triassic)	Tim Haines	4 October 1999	18.91 (Note: 7-day data, including the original Monday broadcast and Sunday repeat for all six episodes.)
By a river, a female Coelophysis stalks a herd of dicynodonts called Placerias, looking for weak members to prey upon. Downstream, a male cynodont resides in a burrow with his family. A female Postosuchus, a rauisuchian and one of the largest carnivores alive in the Triassic, attacks the Placerias herd, and wounds one individual; the herd scatters, leaving the wounded Placerias to the Postosuchus. Early pterosaurs called Peteinosaurus feed on dragonflies and cool themselves in the little water remaining during the drought. Still searching for food, the female Coelophysis, alongside another Coelophysis, discovers the cynodont burrow; the male wards them off. Later that evening, after he goes off hunting, an inquisitive pup follows its father to the entrance and is caught by the female Coelophysis. At night, the cynodont pair cannibalise their remaining pups and then move away. The next day, the Coelophysis work to expose the nest. The female Postosuchus meanwhile is shown to have been wounded by the Placerias, a prior attack on them leaving her with a tusk wound on her thigh. After being unable to successfully hunt another Placerias, she is expelled from her territory by a rival male. Wounded and sick, the female Postosuchus dies and is eaten by a pack of Coelophysis. As the dry season continues, food becomes scarce. The Placerias herd embarks on a journey in search of water, while the Coelophysis begin to cannibalise their young, and the male cynodont also resorts to hunting baby Coelophysis at night. Finally, the wet season arrives; the majority of the Coelophysis have survived (including the lead female), and the cynodont pair have a new clutch of eggs. The episode ends with the arrival of a migrating herd of Plateosaurus, foreshadowing the dominance of the sauropods after the Triassic–Jurassic extinction event.
2	"Time of the Titans"	Colorado, 152 mya (Late Jurassic)	Tim Haines	11 October 1999	17.75
This episode follows the life of a female Diplodocus, beginning at the moment when her mother lays a clutch of eggs at the edge of a conifer forest. Three months later, some of the eggs hatch; the young sauropods are preyed upon by Ornitholestes. After hatching, the hatchlings retreat to the safety of the denser trees. They face many dangers as they grow, including predation by Ornitholestes and Allosaurus. Even a Stegosaurus accidentally also kills one of the hatchlings by swinging its tail while fending off a pair of Allosaurus. Elsewhere, adult herds of Diplodocus are shown using their massive weight to topple trees to reach cycad leaves and giant ferns. Each Diplodocus hosts a small mobile habitat of damselflies, Anurognathus, and dung beetles. After some time, the creche of Diplodocus have grown into subadults. Nearly all are killed by a huge forest fire; only three survivors emerge onto the open plains, including the young female. They encounter several Brachiosaurus before only two reach safety of a herd of adult Diplodocus. Several years later, the female mates, and a few days after, is attacked by a bull Allosaurus. She is saved when another Diplodocus strikes the Allosaurus with its tail. She rejoins the herd, albeit with deep wounds on her side, but she will recover. The closing narration notes that the sauropods will only get larger, becoming the largest animals ever to walk the Earth.
3	"Cruel Sea"	Oxfordshire, 149 mya (Late Jurassic)	Jasper James	18 October 1999	17.96
The episode begins with a Eustreptospondylus being snatched from the shore by a male Liopleurodon that has grown to be 25 meters by surviving for a century. Meanwhile, hundreds of Ophthalmosaurus arrive from the open ocean to give birth. Hybodus and a Liopleurodon are on the hunt; when a mother Ophthalmosaurus has trouble giving birth, a pair of Hybodus pursue her. They are frightened off by the male Liopleurodon, which eats the front half of the ichthyosaur. Meanwhile, a Eustreptospondylus swims to an island and discovers a turtle carcass; it fights over the carcass with another Eustreptospondylus. Later, during the night, a group of horseshoe crabs gather at the shore to lay their eggs, which attracts a flock of Rhamphorhynchus in the morning to eat the eggs. However, a few of the pterosaurs are caught and eaten by a Eustreptospondylus. While the Ophthalmosaurus juveniles are growing up, they are hunted by Hybodus, which in turn, are prey for the Liopleurodon. While the male Liopleurodon is hunting, he encounters a female Liopleurodon; after the male bites one of her flippers, she retreats from his territory, and a group of Hybodus follows the trail of her blood. A cyclone strikes the islands, killing many animals, including several Rhamphorhynchus and the Liopleurodon, who is washed ashore and eventually suffocates under his own weight. A group of Eustreptospondylus feed on his carcass. At the end of the episode, the juvenile Ophthalmosaurus that survived the storm are now large enough to swim off and live in the open sea.
4	"Giant of the Skies"	Brazil, North America, England, Cantabria, 127 mya (Early Cretaceous)	Jasper James	25 October 1999	16.8
The episode begins with a male Ornithocheirus (Note: The pterosaur identified as Ornithocheirus in Giant of the Skies was actually based on fossils of the pterosaur Tropeognathus, the two having been considered synonyms by David Unwin, one of the consulting palaeontologists.) dead on a beach. Six months earlier, the Ornithocheirus, resting among a colony of breeding Tapejaras in Brazil, flies off for Cantabria where he too must mate. He flies past a migrating group of Iguanodon and the nodosaur Polacanthus. He reaches the southern tip of North America, where he is forced to seek shelter from a storm. He grooms himself, expelling his body of fleas; the crest on his jaw begins to change colour in preparation for the mating season. He then sets off across the Atlantic, which was then only 300 kilometres (186 miles) wide, and after a whole day on the wing, reaches the westernmost of the European islands. He does not rest there however, as a pack of Utahraptors are hunting Iguanodon; a young Utahraptor is bullied off an Iguanodon carcass by the adults. The Ornithocheirus flies to the outskirts of a forest to rest after stealing a fish from another pterosaur, but is driven away by a flock of Iberomesornis. Flying on, he reaches Cantabria, but due to the delays, exhaustion, and old age he cannot reach the centre of the many grounded male Ornithocheirus and consequently he does not mate. After several days under the sun trying to attract a mate, the protagonist Ornithocheirus dies from a combination of heat stress and starvation. The same fate befalls others who had lost out in the attempt to attract a mate. The next generation of Ornithocheirus feeds on their corpses.
5	"Spirits of the Ice Forest"	Antarctica, 106 mya (Early Cretaceous)	Tim Haines	1 November 1999	15.95
A few hundred kilometres from the South Pole, a clan of Leaellynasaura emerge during spring after several months of total darkness. They feed on the fresh plant growth (which has adapted to the changing seasons), and build nests to lay their eggs; a Koolasuchus also wakes and heads to a river, where he will stay during the summer. Out on the banks of the river, migrating herds of Muttaburrasaurus have also arrived to feed and lay their eggs. When summer arrives, many of the Leaellynasaura clan's eggs have been eaten; however, those of the matriarch hatch successfully. Meanwhile, a male polar allosauroid (Note: The polar allosaur was incorrectly referred to as Australovenator on a BBC website, a genus that wasn't discovered until 2006 and described until 2009, just about a decade after Walking with Dinosaurs premiered. The allosaur featured is actually based on fragmentary remains found at Cape Paterson.) hunts both the Leaellynasaura and the Muttaburrasaurus, the latter species also having to deal with blood-sucking insects. When autumn arrives, the Muttaburrasaurus herd begins to migrate, and the Koolasuchus leaves the river to find a pool for hibernation. During the migration, some Muttaburrasaurus become lost in the forest; they vocalize loudly while trying to return to their herd, preventing the Leaellynasaura clan's sentries from hearing the polar allosaur approaching. It manages to kill the matriarch of the clan. Winter descends and the forest is shrouded in darkness, but the now matriarch-less Leaellynasaura clan is able to stay active, using their large eyes to help them forage for food. The clan and other creatures are also shown to use various methods of coping with the cold such as being frozen alive or suspended animation. Finally, spring returns, and two Leaellynasaura males challenge each other for the right to mate, and the clan establishes a new dominant pair. The closing narration acknowledges that soon this landmass will be pulled closer to the South Pole and when that happens, this unique ecosystem and its inhabitants will disappear.
6	"Death of a Dynasty"	Montana, 65.5 mya (Late Cretaceous)	Jasper James	8 November 1999	15.69
Several months before the Cretaceous–Paleogene extinction event, the last dinosaurs are living under intense environmental stress due to excessive volcanism. A female Tyrannosaurus abandons her nest, the eggs rendered infertile due to acidic pollution. Her calls for a mate are answered by a smaller male, who kills a young Triceratops to appease her. Three days later, after repeated copulation, she drives him off. The mother fasts as she tends to her nest, contending with raids by dromaeosaurs and Didelphodon. Meanwhile, herds of Anatotitan wander between islands of vegetation among the volcanic ash, and Torosaurus rut for the right to mate, while losing their young to attacking dromaeosaurs. Only three of the Tyrannosaurus eggs hatch; the mother hunts an Anatotitan to feed herself and her brood. Several days later, while defending her two surviving offspring, the mother is fatally injured by the tail of an Ankylosaurus. The juveniles remain expectantly next to the carcass of their mother the next morning; several hours later, they are killed along with the other dinosaurs in the region by the impact of a comet in the Gulf of Mexico. The impact, said to be as powerful as ten billion Hiroshima bombs, resulted in 65% of life -the dinosaurs included- dying out in the ensuing cataclysmic changes to the climate. In an epilogue, the present-day African plains are shown; while they are now dominated by mammals after millions of years of recovery from the impact, they are still populated by a small group of dinosaurs that did survive the extinction: the birds.
–	"The Making of Walking with Dinosaurs"	N/A	Jasper James	6 October 1999	7.19
Behind-the-scenes documentary: 50-minute special documenting the series' paleontological influence, animatronic effects, CGI and the real location shooting for the series background.

=== Specials (2000–2003) ===
Three special episodes of Walking with Dinosaurs have been produced since the end of the original series. The first special was The Ballad of Big Al (2000), which closely followed the format of the original series but mostly focused on a single individual animal, an Allosaurus specimen nicknamed "Big Al". In response to complaints from scientists that many details in the original series seemed speculative, The Ballad of Big Al explained virtually every decision in detail and how it was based on fossil evidence. The two succeeding specials, The Giant Claw (2002) and Land of Giants (2003), (Note: Land of Giants and The Giant Claw were marketed together in the United States as the stand-alone two-part series Chased by Dinosaurs.) starred wildlife presenter Nigel Marven as a "time-travelling zoologist", travelling back in time and interacting with various dinosaurs and other prehistoric animals. (Note: In addition to the three special episodes accounted for here, the 2003 three-part miniseries Sea Monsters, with the full title Sea Monsters: A Walking with Dinosaurs Trilogy, is sometimes considered part of Walking with Dinosaurs and sometimes not.)

No.	Title	Time period and location	Directed by	Original release date	U.K. viewers (millions)
(7)	"The Ballad of Big Al"	Wyoming, 145 mya (Late Jurassic)	Kate Bartlett	25 December 2000	Unknown
A biography of how the Allosaurus "Big Al" might have lived, in the same format as the original series. Includes many of the dinosaurs seen in the previous episode Time of the Titans, alongside the new additions Apatosaurus and Othnielia.
–	"Big Al Uncovered" (Note: Renamed 'Big Al: The Science' and 'Allosaurus: Big Al Uncovered' on the UK and USA DVD releases respectively.)	N/A	Kate Bartlett	27 December 2000	6.72
Behind-the-scenes documentary: A documentary following the scientific research that informed Big Al's life story, including the similarities dinosaurs shared with birds and Crocodilians, the fossil site that inspired the predator trap scene, and the fossil specimens Big Al and "Willo".
(8)	"The Giant Claw"	Mongolia, 75 mya (Late Cretaceous)	Tim Haines	30 December 2002	6.83
Nigel Marven searches the deserts and forests of Cretaceous Mongolia for Therizinosaurus, an obscure dinosaur with massive fossil claws, believing it to have been a huge carnivore. Throughout his journey, Marven comes face-to-face with dinosaurs such as Saurolophus, Protoceratops, Mononykus, Velociraptor and Tarbosaurus, a close relative of the famous Tyrannosaurus rex. Once Marven finds live Therizinosaurus he discovers them to have been a bizarre type of giant plant-eating theropod dinosaur.
(9)	"Land of Giants"	Argentina, 100 mya (Middle Cretaceous)	Jasper James	1 January 2003	5.76
In Middle Cretaceous Argentina, Marven searches for the largest dinosaurs of all time. He encounters a herd of Argentinosaurus, one of the largest sauropod dinosaurs, and observes the long and drawn-out hunt of the sauropods by one of the largest predatory dinosaurs, Giganotosaurus. During his journey, Marven also uses a small plane to fly with pterosaurs such as Pteranodon and Ornithocheirus, and he also encounters the massive crocodyliform Sarcosuchus.

== Reception ==
Walking with Dinosaurs was broadcast to record audiences and is sometimes considered the biggest science documentary series ever created. With 15 million viewers viewing the first episode on 4 October 1999 and another 3.91 million viewing it on its repeat the Sunday afterwards, Walking with Dinosaurs is by far the most watched science programme in British television history. In the United States, Discovery Channel's airings topped the weekly Nielsen Ratings for prime time cable television, with 10.76 million viewers in the week of 10–16 April 2000.

By late 2000, 200 million people worldwide had seen the Walking with Dinosaurs. By 2005 the number had increased to almost 400 million and by 2009 it was around 700 million; unprecedented numbers for a palaeontology programme. In the BFI TV 100, a list compiled by the British Film Institute in 2000 of the greatest British TV programmes of all time and of any genre, Walking with Dinosaurs was placed 72nd.

=== Reviews ===
Walking with Dinosaurs was released to critical acclaim. It was praised in The Guardian, The Observer, The Independent and in The Independent On Sunday. Most scientists applauded Walking with Dinosaurs for its use of scientific research and for its portrayal of dinosaurs as animals and not movie monsters. Online reviewers were largely positive. Common Sense Media praised the program, giving it five stars out of five and saying:

Somebody had a great idea, which was to make a documentary series about dinosaurs, but with a twist. The ageing Ornithocheirus on a desperate final flight to his mating grounds, the sauropod hatchlings struggling for survival in the late Jurassic, the migrating herds and the undersea life of 150 million years ago would all seem as real as a nature program about polar bears or snow monkeys.

IGN referred to Walking with Dinosaurs as a fascinating documentary with excellent narratives, video quality and audio quality. The score of Walking with Dinosaurs was praised in the music technology magazine Sound on Sound as "extraordinary", "strikingly cinematic" and "head and shoulders above previous efforts in the same genre".

Some reviews were dismissive and contemptuous. The negative reviews were mostly founded on the series in some cases appearing to present speculation as fact. Nancy Banks-Smith also worried that the success of the series would lead to the BBC exploiting its appeal to younger viewers and launching merchandise, writing that "I begin to think that the whole thing is geared to selling chocolate dinosaur eggs to five-year-olds".

=== Awards ===
List of awards and nominations
Award	Category	Recipients and nominees	Result
28th Annie Awards	Technical Achievement in the Field of Animation		Won
British Academy Television Awards 2000	Outstanding Innovation		Won
2000 British Academy Television Craft Awards	Best Original Television Music	Ben Bartlett	Won
52nd Primetime Emmy Awards	Primetime Emmy Award for Outstanding Animated Program (One Hour or More)	Tim Haines, Jasper James, Georgann Kane, Tomi Bednar Landis, John Lynch, Mike Milne	Won
52nd Primetime Emmy Awards	Outstanding Special Visual Effects	Tim Greenwood, Jez Harris, Daren Horley, Alec Knox, Virgil Manning, David Marsh, Mike McGee, Mike Milne, Carlos Rosas	Won
52nd Primetime Emmy Awards	Outstanding Music Composition for a Miniseries, Movie, or a Special	Ben Bartlett	Nominated
52nd Primetime Emmy Awards	Outstanding Picture Editing in Non-Fiction Program	Britt Sjoerdsma, Andrew Wilks	Nominated
52nd Primetime Emmy Awards	Outstanding Achievement in Non-Fiction Programming – Sound Mixing	Bob Jackson	Nominated
52nd Primetime Emmy Awards	Outstanding Sound Editing in Non-Fiction Program	Simon Gotel, Andrew Sherriff	Won
6th National Television Awards	Most Popular Factual Programme		Nominated
12th Golden Laurel Awards	David L. Wolper Award for Outstanding Producer of Long-Form Television (Best Original Television Music)		Nominated
Peabody Awards	Peabody Award	BBC, Discovery Channel, TV Asahi Co-production, ProSieben and France 3	Won
RTS Television Awards	Team		Won
RTS Craft & Design Awards	Design and Craft Innovation	Mike Milne, Jez Harris	Won
RTS Craft & Design Awards	Best Visual Effects – Digital Effects	Framestore CFC	Won
RTS Craft & Design Awards	Best Picture Manipulation	Timothy Greenwood, Mike McGee	Nominated
TV Quick Awards	Best Factual Programme		Won
16th TCA Awards	Outstanding Achievement in News and Information		Nominated
TRIC Awards	Documentary Programme of the Year		Won
22nd Young Artist Awards	Best Educational TV Show or Series		Won

== In other media ==
=== Books ===
A companion book, Walking with Dinosaurs: A Natural History, was written by Tim Haines to accompany the first screening of the series in 1999. The settings of some of the six episodes were changed between the time the book was written and the screening of the television series, and some of their names were changed: New Blood is set at Ghost Ranch, and Cruel Sea is set at or near Solnhofen in Germany near what then were the Vindelicisch Islands. The book elaborated on the background for each story, went further in explaining the science on which much of the program is based, and included descriptions of several animals not identified or featured in the series. A Natural History received a positive review in the book review magazine Publishers Weekly, where it was called "magnificent" and "marvelously illustrated".

A companion volume to the first book, Walking with Dinosaurs: The Evidence, by David Martill and Darren Naish was published in 2000. It went into more detail about the research and suppositions that went into making the series. Michael J. Benton also wrote an accompanying book on the science of the series, titled Walking with Dinosaurs: The Facts. In addition to these larger volumes, there were also numerous children's books released to accompany Walking with Dinosaurs, including 3D albums, sticker albums, photo journals as well as shorter science books geared towards children.

=== Exhibition ===
The success of Walking with Dinosaurs resulted in the creation of both exhibits and travelling exhibitions. Only a few months after the series had aired, Walking with Dinosaurs: The Exhibition was put up in the summer of 2000 at the Yorkshire Museum in York, England. The exhibition featured an assortment of different animal exhibits, each having some connection to the series, including props, maquettes, newly made models and actual fossil material. Among the fossils on display was a skeleton of a Plateosaurus. Also included in the exhibition were a video and TV monitor playing The Making Of Walking with Dinosaurs. The opening of the exhibition was attended by consultants of the series, such as David Martill. The guest of honour was Prince Philip, Duke of Edinburgh.

=== Live theatrical show ===
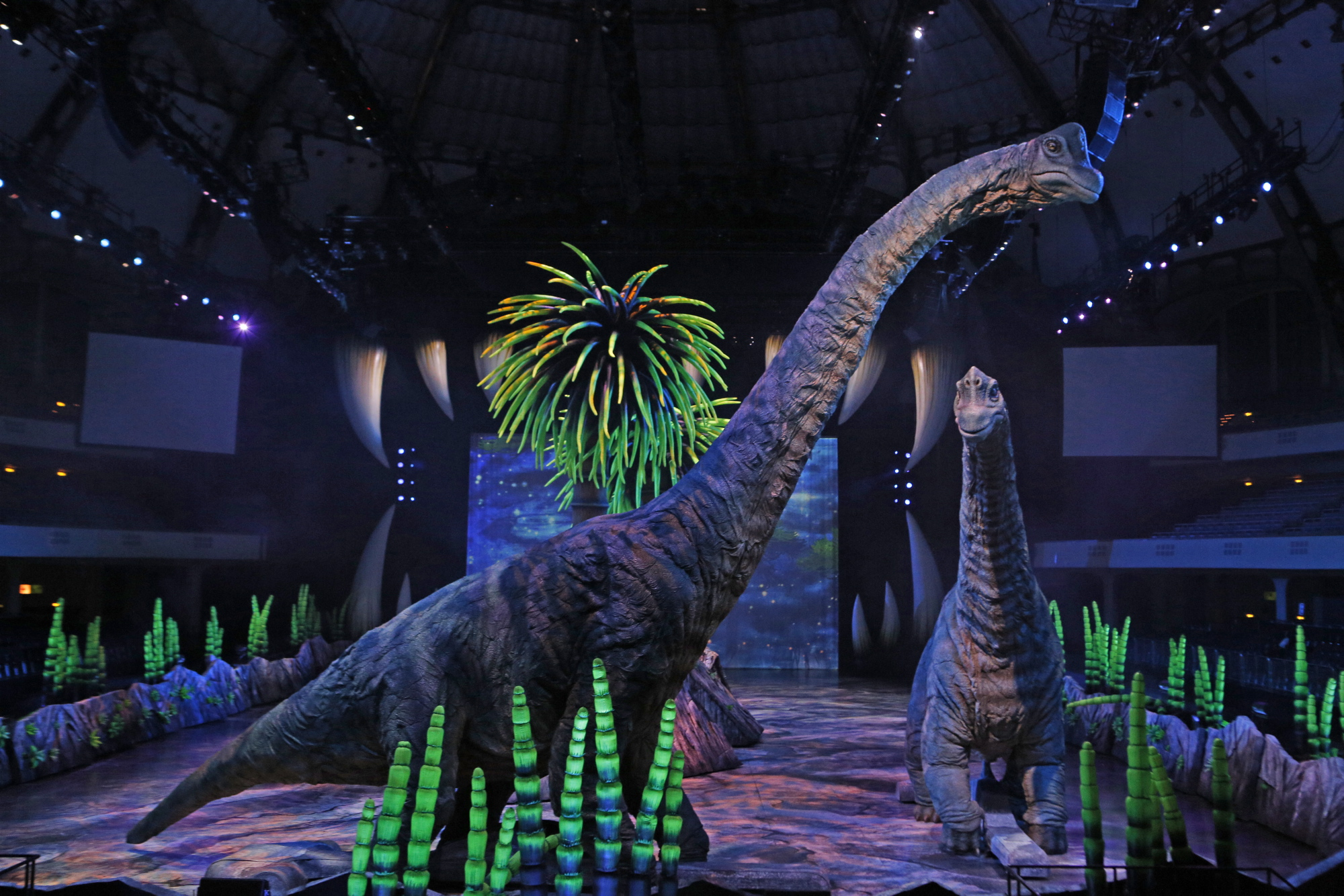
Brachiosaurus in Walking with Dinosaurs − The Arena Spectacular

In 2007, Walking with Dinosaurs was adapted as the live stage show Walking with Dinosaurs − The Arena Spectacular by the Australian-based company The Creature Technology Company. The production cost $20 million to stage and used puppetry, suits, and animatronics to create 16 Mesozoic era creatures representing 10 species. Each large dinosaur weighed several tons, and was operated by two "voodoo puppeteers" and a driver beneath the dinosaur who also monitors the hydraulics and batteries. The smaller dinosaurs were suits operated by the person in it, each weighing from 20–30 kg (44–66 lbs). After debuting in Sydney in 2007, The Arena Spectacular toured the world for twelve years; over 250 cities were visited and almost 10 million people in total watched the show live. The final show was held at the Taipei Arena in Taiwan on 22 December 2019.

=== Film adaptation ===
Released in 2013, Walking with Dinosaurs is a feature-length film about dinosaurs in the Late Cretaceous period 70 million years ago. The production features computer-animated dinosaurs in live-action settings with actors Justin Long, John Leguizamo, Tiya Sircar, and Skyler Stone providing voiceovers for the main characters. It was directed by Neil Nightingale and Barry Cook from a screenplay by John Collee.

The film was produced by BBC Earth and Evergreen Films and was named after the original BBC miniseries. The film, with a budget of US$80 million, was one of the largest independent productions to date; it was financed by Reliance Entertainment and IM Global, with 20th Century Fox handling distribution. The crew filmed footage on location in the U.S. state of Alaska and in New Zealand, which were chosen for their similarities to the dinosaurs' surroundings millions of years ago, and on locations in Humboldt County, California. Animal Logic designed computer-animated dinosaurs and added them to the live-action backdrop. Though the film was originally going to have a narrator like in the miniseries, Fox executives wanted to add voiceovers to connect audiences to the characters.

Walking with Dinosaurs premiered on 14 December 2013 at the Dubai International Film Festival. It was released in cinemas in 2D and 3D on 20 December 2013. Critical reception was largely negative, with praise towards film's visual effects but criticism for its story and voice acting. The film grossed US$34.4 million in the United States and Canada and US$71.6 million in other territories for a worldwide total of US$106 million. The Hollywood Reporter said the film's global box office performance was disappointing in context of the production budget and marketing spend.

In 2014, the film was rereleased in theatres and museums under the title Walking with Dinosaurs: Prehistoric Planet 3D. This version shortens the running time to 45 minutes and replaces the voiceovers with narration provided by Benedict Cumberbatch. Compared to its predecessor, this version received mixed-to-positive reviews from critics.

=== Video games ===
Dinosaur World is a freeware video game developed by Asylum Entertainment and its sister studio, Qube. The game was published by the BBC Imagineering in June 2001. It is a spin-off of Episode 2 of Walking with Dinosaurs ("Time of the Titans") and the special The Ballad of Big Al. The main point of the game is to find all the animals and plants, including several location features, that are distributed in five different zones. The game was available on an archived BBC website as an alpha, as it was never fully developed.

In 2013, an augmented reality video game, titled simply Walking with Dinosaurs, was developed by Supermassive Games in collaboration with the BBC, as part of the resurgence of Walking with Dinosaurs, accompanying the release of the 2013 film adaptation. It was released in Europe on 13 November 2013, and in North America on 12 November 2013, alongside Diggs Nightcrawler and Book of Potions.

=== Website ===
To accompany Walking with Dinosaurs, the BBC launched a website filled with both palaeontological information, behind-the-scenes information on the series, games and puzzles, glossaries, and a section where visitors could ask questions and make comments. The creation of a companion website, which went online in September 1999, was considered innovative for the time. Before the release of the series, the website included a trailer, still a new concept for a website in 1999. The website was updated weekly as new episodes were released, eventually becoming a large resource with educational material.

== Legacy and influence ==
=== Scientific response ===
Scientists largely applauded Walking with Dinosaurs, some going so far as heralding it as the "most credibly accurate depiction of dinosaur life ever produced." Despite some complaints of scientific inaccuracies, the series was seen, and continues to be remembered, as mostly a "force for good", showing both the possibility of producing documentaries of its scale and for portraying dinosaurs and other Mesozoic animals as animals and not movie monsters. Michael J. Benton, who worked as a consultant on the series, praised Walking with Dinosaurs as a progression in both reconstructions of prehistoric life and in the promotion of the public understanding of science; Benton in a 2001 article referred to the series as not just a documentary but also a "powerful piece of palaeobiological research", showing to the public what the "best minds in palaeobiology have been able to achieve." Numerous scientific journal articles have been written on Walking with Dinosaurs and the phenomenon it created.

==== Scientific errors ====
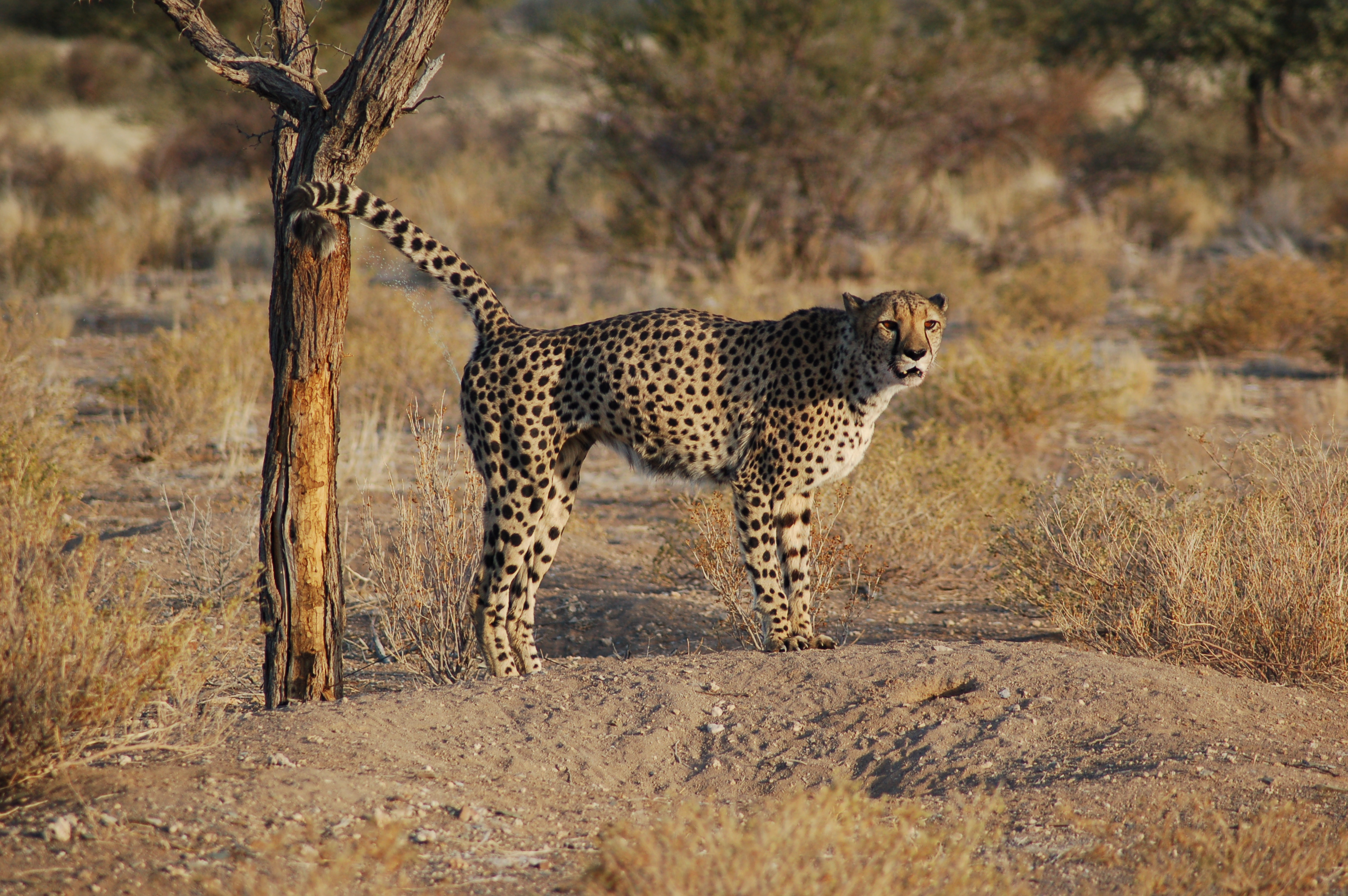
A cheetah marking its territory through urination. Walking with Dinosaurs controversially depicted this behaviour in the pseudosuchian Postosuchus.

Although the academic response to Walking with Dinosaurs was largely positive, the series was criticised by some palaeontologists for its speculative storylines and the boldness of some of its claims, noting that some aspects presented as fact were very much speculative and possible to be challenged in the future. In the companion book of the series, Haines admitted that speculating about dinosaur behaviour in of itself is unscientific since the theories cannot be tested, but maintained that it "seems well worth trying to find out more about how [the dinosaurs] may have lived", using both science and reasoned speculation. A handful of decisions and sequences in the series came under particular palaeontological criticism. Several supposed errors identified in the first weeks after the series aired fizzled out after a while, as critics found points about which they disagreed with one another and were unable to definitively prove their views. Most of the errors or otherwise questionable decisions of Walking with Dinosaurs were not the fault of the production team since they worked based on the advice of their consultants.

New Blood shows a male Postosuchus urinating to mark a female's territory as his own after she is driven away from it. A number of critics pointed out that birds and crocodiles, the closest living relatives of the dinosaurs, do not urinate; they shed waste chemicals as more solid uric acid. However, Michael J. Benton, a consultant of the series, noted that nobody could prove that this was a real mistake: copious urination is the primitive state for tetrapods (seen in fish, amphibians, turtles, and mammals), and perhaps basal archosaurs did the same. New Blood also depicts Plateosaurus as a quadruped, but more recent studies suggest that it was an obligate biped due to its inability to pronate its manus.

Diplodocus was reconstructed with mostly horizontal necks in Walking with Dinosaurs, an idea consistent with what was thought of their biology at the time, and thus pushed by the palaeontological consultants of the series, but challenged by new research in 2009.

The pterosaur identified as Ornithocheirus in Giant of the Skies was actually based on fossils of the pterosaur Tropeognathus, the two having been considered synonyms by David Unwin, one of the consulting palaeontologists. Additionally, it is depicted as far larger than it actually was. In the companion book, it was claimed that several large bone fragments from the Romualdo Formation of Brazil possibly indicate that Ornithocheirus may have had a wingspan reaching almost 12 metres and a weight of a hundred kilograms, making it one of the largest known pterosaurs. However, the largest definite Tropeognathus specimens described at the time measured 6 metres (20 ft), in terms of wingspan. The specimens which the producers of the program used to justify such a large size estimate were described in 2012 (with the designation MN 6594-V) and were under study by Dave Martill and David Unwin at the time of the production of the series. The final description of the remains found a maximum estimated wingspan of 8.70 metres (28.5 ft) for this large specimen. Unwin stated that he did not believe the higher estimate used by the BBC was likely, and that the producers likely chose the highest possible estimate because it was more "spectacular." Another famously "super-sized" animal in Walking with Dinosaurs is the pliosaur Liopleurodon, described as reaching lengths of 25 m (82 ft) in the series. This representation is mainly based on a vertebra discovered from the Oxford Clay near Peterborough and housed in the Peterborough Museum and Art Gallery, with which David M. Martill and Darren Naish, the former of whom then consultant to the series, extrapolated it to a length between 17 and 20 m (56 and 66 ft) and claimed that Liopleurodon and related forms could have reached the size depicted in the series, today recognized as very exaggerated but at the time seen as reliable. The largest known specimen of Liopleurodon is currently thought to have reached 8.09 m (26.5 ft) long.

=== Television and popular culture ===
Walking with Dinosaurs was recognised by several commentators as marking a watershed in television imagery and a scientifically and technologically significant benchmark in television history. Walking with Dinosaurs is often credited for inspiring modern interest in the distant geological past. Scientific papers have credited Jurassic Park and Walking with Dinosaurs as the two major productions inspiring increasing public interest in dinosaurs and other Mesozoic life in the 1990s and 2000s. The success of Walking with Dinosaurs led to the inception of an entirely new genre of documentaries that like Walking with Dinosaurs also recreated past life with computer graphics and were envisioned in the style of nature documentaries.

=== Sequel series ===
The success of Walking with Dinosaurs led to the creation of an entire nature documentary media franchise on prehistoric life, commonly referred to as the Walking with... series. The first sequel series to Walking with Dinosaurs was Walking with Beasts (2001), made by largely the same production team (now organised as the production company Impossible Pictures) and focusing on life in the Cenozoic, after the extinction of the non-avian dinosaurs. Next was Walking with Cavemen (2003), which was created without Haines and Impossible Pictures and focused on human evolution. The last series to be made was Walking with Monsters (2005), once again involving much of the original team and focused on life in the Paleozoic, before the time of the dinosaurs. During the production of Walking with Monsters, the production team considered the series to complete the "Trilogy of Life", previously began with Dinosaurs and continued with Beasts.

The success of the two special episodes The Giant Claw and Land of Giants led to the creation of the three-part miniseries Sea Monsters (2003), once again starring Marven travelling back to prehistoric times, this time exploring the "seven deadliest seas of all time".

=== 2025 revival ===
On 4 June 2024, it was announced that a 2025 revival of the series, also called Walking with Dinosaurs, was under production by BBC, along with PBS, ZDF and France Télévisions. The revival is a six-episode series; each 50-minute episode focuses on a current paleontological excavation and a dramatized story involving the dinosaurs recovered from each site. The new series is narrated by Bertie Carvel, with Andrew Cohen and Helen Thomas as executive producers, Kirsty Wilson as showrunner, and Stephen Cooter, Tom Hewitson, and Owen Gower as producer/directors. In the UK, BBC One began airing the series on 25 May 2025, with the remaining episodes streamed on BBC iPlayer on the same day. In the United States, PBS aired the series as a three-day event starting 16 June 2025.
