= List of schools in the London Borough of Enfield =

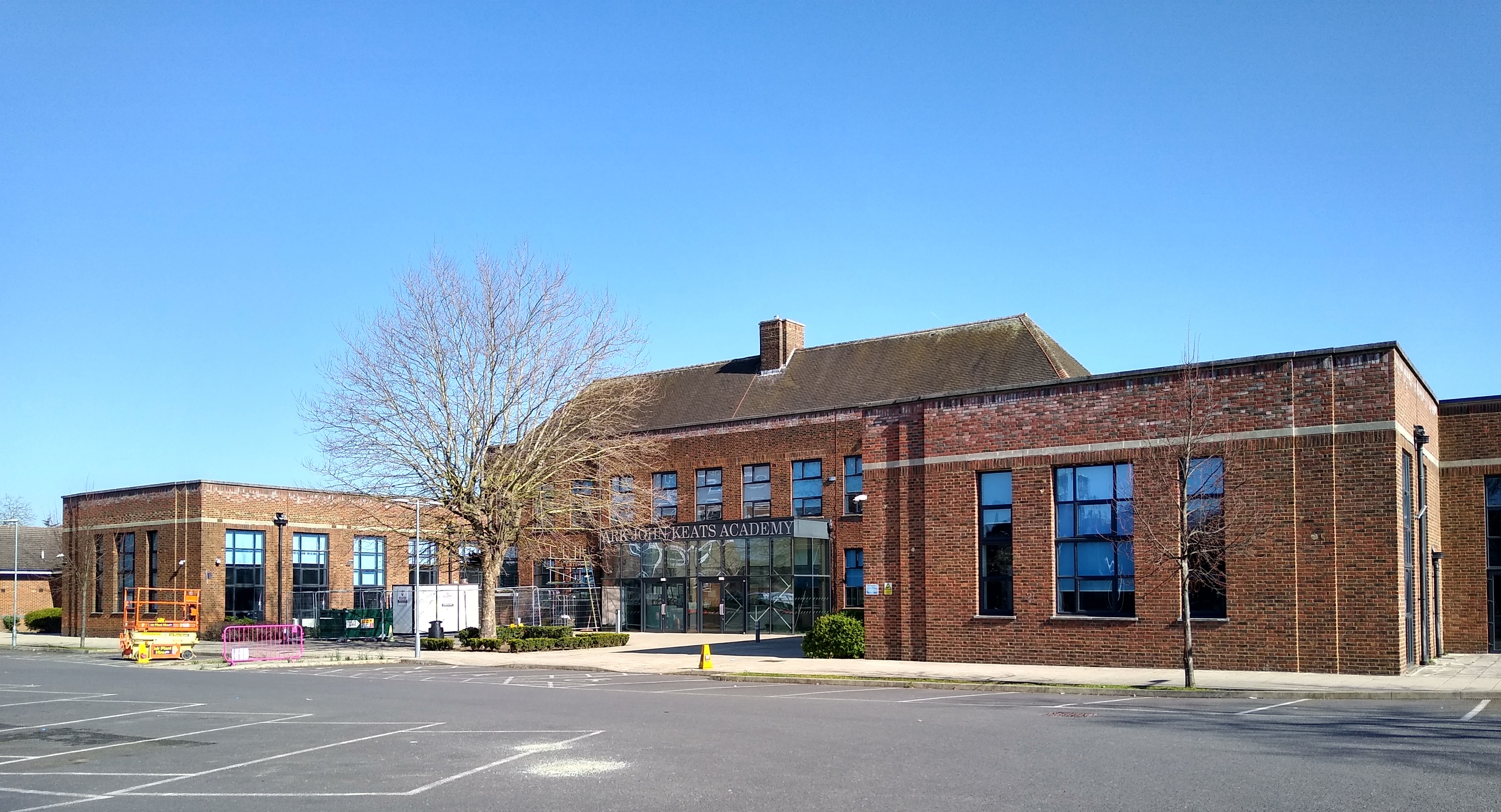
Ark John Keats Academy

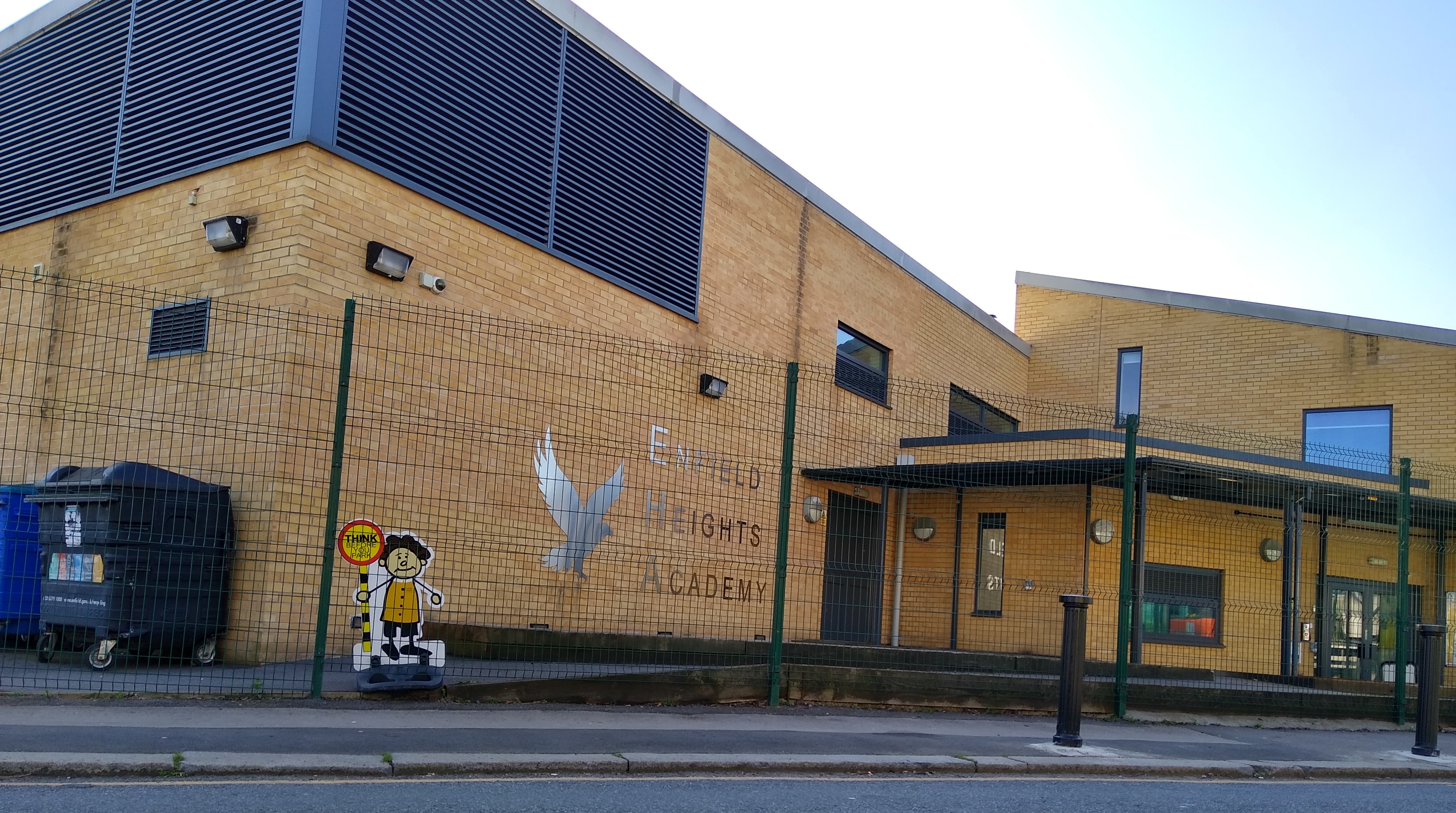
Enfield Heights Academy

This is a list of schools in the London Borough of Enfield, England.

== State-funded schools ==
=== Primary schools ===
Source. Further source (CE indicates Church of England, RC Roman Catholic schools).

- Alma Primary School
- Ark John Keats Academy
- Bowes Primary School
- Brettenham Primary School
- Brimsdown Primary School
- Bush Hill Park Primary School
- Capel Manor Primary School
- Carterhatch Infant School
- Carterhatch Junior School
- Chase Side Primary School
- Chesterfield Primary School
- Churchfield Primary School
- De Bohun Primary School
- Delta Primary School
- Eastfield Primary School
- Edmonton County School
- Eldon Primary School
- Enfield Heights Academy
- Eversley Primary School
- Firs Farm Primary School
- Fleecefield Primary School
- Forty Hill Primary School (CE)
- Freezywater St George's Primary School (CE)
- Galliard Primary School
- Garfield Primary School
- George Spicer Primary School
- Grange Park Primary School
- Hadley Wood Primary School
- Hazelbury Primary School
- Hazelwood Infant School
- Hazelwood Junior School
- Highfield Primary School
- Honilands Primary School
- Houndsfield Primary School
- Keys Meadow Primary School
- Kingfisher Hall Primary Academy
- Latymer All Saints Primary School (CE)
- Lavender Primary School
- Meridian Angel Primary School
- Merryhills Primary School
- Oakthorpe Primary School
- Oasis Academy Hadley
- One Degree Academy
- Our Lady of Lourdes Primary School (RC)
- Prince of Wales Primary School
- Raglan Infant School
- The Raglan Junior School
- Raynham Primary School
- St Andrew's Primary School (CE)
- St Andrew's Southgate Primary School (CE)
- St Edmund's Primary School (RC)
- St George's Primary School (RC)
- St James Primary School (CE)
- St John & St James Primary School (CE)
- St John's Primary School (CE)
- St Mary's Primary School (RC)
- St Matthew's Primary School (CE)
- St Michael at Bowes Junior School (CE)
- St Michael's Primary School (CE)
- St Monica's Primary School (RC)
- St Paul's Primary School (CE)
- Southbury Primary School
- Starks Field Primary School
- Suffolks Primary School
- Tottenhall Infant School
- Walker Primary School
- West Grove Primary School
- Wilbury Primary School
- Wolfson Hillel Primary School
- Woodpecker Hall Primary Academy
- Worcesters Primary School

=== Non-selective secondary schools ===
- AIM North London Academy
- Ark John Keats Academy
- Aylward Academy
- Bishop Stopford's School
- Chace Community School
- Edmonton County School
- Enfield County School
- Enfield Grammar School
- Heron Hall Academy
- Highlands School
- Kingsmead School
- Laurel Park School
- Lea Valley Academy
- Oasis Academy Enfield
- Oasis Academy Hadley
- St Anne's Catholic High School
- St Ignatius College
- Southgate School
- Winchmore School
- Wren Academy Enfield

=== Grammar schools ===
- The Latymer School (selective, co-ed)

=== Special and alternative schools ===
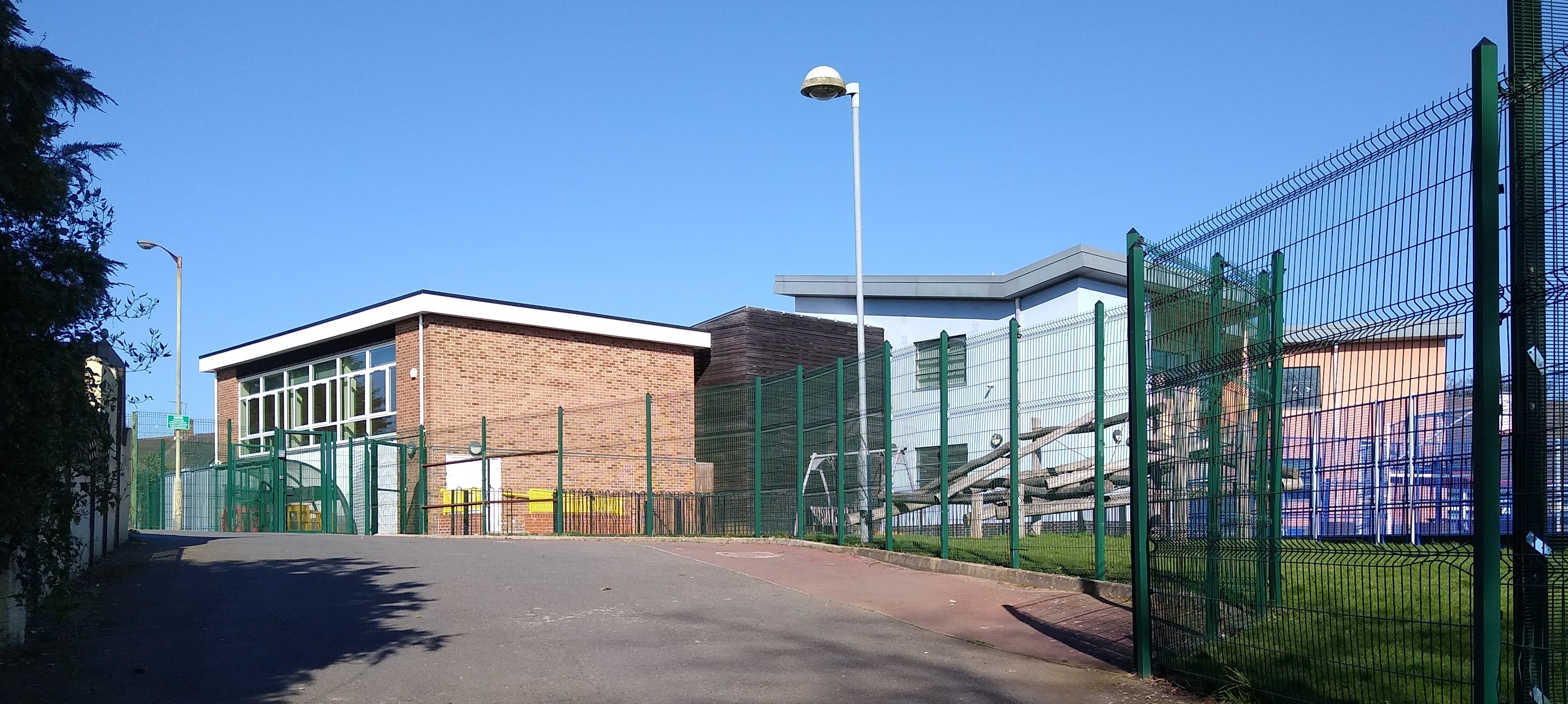
Durants School

- Durants School
- Fern House School
- Oaktree School
- Orchardside School
- Russet House School
- Salmons Brook School
- Waverley School
- West Lea School

=== Further education ===
- Barnet and Southgate College
- Capel Manor College
- The College of Haringey, Enfield and North East London

== Independent schools ==
=== Primary and preparatory schools ===
- Grange Park Preparatory School
- Keble School
- Salcombe Preparatory School
- Vita Et Pax School

=== Senior and all-through schools ===
- Palmers Green High School
- St John's Senior School

=== Special and alternative schools ===
- Alternative Centre of Education
- First Rung Independent School
- Focus 1st Academy
- Freshsteps Independent school
- North London Hospital School
- Silverways School

== Former schools ==
=== Senior and all-through schools ===
- Phoenix Academy (closed 19th December 2025)
