= Walking with Cavemen =

2003 British television documentary series

- Cover of the original UK DVD release
- Genre: Nature documentary
- Created by: Richard Dale; Peter Georgi
- Directed by: Richard Dale
- Presented by: Robert Winston
- Narrated by: Robert Winston; Alec Baldwin (US); Andrew Sachs (2-part version)
- Composer: Alan Parker
- Country of origin: United Kingdom
- Original language: English
- No. of episodes: 4

Production
- Executive producer: Richard Dale
- Producers: Peter Georgi; Nick Green; Mark Hedgecoe; Peter Oxley
- Editors: John Lynch; Gerard Evans; Peter Parnham; Tim Murrell
- Running time: 25 minutes
- Production company: BBC Science Unit
- Budget: £4 million

Original release
- Network: BBC, Discovery Channel, ProSieben
- Release: 27 March – 17 April 2003

Walking with Cavemen is a 2003 four-part nature documentary television miniseries produced by the BBC Science Unit, the Discovery Channel and ProSieben. Walking with Cavemen explores human evolution, showcasing various extinct hominin species and their inferred behaviours and social dynamics. The original British version of the series is presented by the British researcher Robert Winston; in the American version Winston's appearances and narration is replaced with narration by Alec Baldwin.

Walking with Cavemen is the third installment in the Walking with... series of documentaries, following on from Walking with Dinosaurs (1999) and Walking with Beasts (2001), and like its predecessors uses computer-generated imagery and animatronics, as well as live action footage shot at various locations, to reconstruct prehistoric life and environments. In order to ensure that Walking with Cavemen was consistent with scientific understanding of human evolution and that it portrayed the time periods and locations accurately, the production team employed a team of 111 scientists from various fields to advise on the series.

In addition to the techniques also used in previous series, Walking with Cavemen uses actors to portray extinct hominins since it was deemed impossible to evoke convincing human expressions and emotions using just computer graphics. The hominins in the series were portrayed by fourteen different actors wearing makeup and prosthetics. The series garnered a positive reception among both critics and scientists. Though there were concerns of conjecture being presented as fact, the series was praised for making the scientific theories concerning human evolution accessible to a wider audience. A companion book, Walking with Cavemen: Stand Eye-to-Eye with your Ancestors, was also released in 2003 and received positive reviews.

== Premise ==
Walking with Cavemen follows the previous series Walking with Dinosaurs (1999) and Walking with Beasts (2001) in showcasing prehistoric life in a nature documentary style. Beginning in Ethiopia 3.2 million years ago, Walking with Cavemen follows the story of human evolution through exploring key developments on the path from Australopithecus afarensis to modern humans. The programme often focuses on particular characters and their relationships to each other in order to be more accessible to viewers.

== Production ==
Partly due to some of the scientific criticism that had been levelled at previous instalments in the Walking with... franchise of documentaries, the production team of Walking with Cavemen recruited a large team of 111 scientists from various fields to advise on the series. The scientific team included experts on stone tools, geologists, primatologists, geneticists and climatologists, among others.

Like previous Walking with... series, Walking with Cavemen employed both computer graphics and animatronics to recreate prehistoric life. When possible, footage of actual live animals was used but other creatures, such as mammoths, had to be recreated through computer graphics. The visual effects were, as for previous series in the franchise, created by the visual effects company Framestore. Walking with Cavemen pioneered a new visual technique, the "deep timelapse", in which scenes of climate, environmental and geological change spanning millions of years were put in a timelapse to only take a few moments.

The title Walking with Cavemen was settled upon during production. The title was chosen to appeal to the outdated stereotype of human ancestors being cave-dwellers (the programme does not portray hominins in caves until the last episode) in order to turn viewer's expectations on their head and showcase that the past was not necessarily what they imagined it to be. It was determined to begin the series with Australopithecus afarensis, at the time of production the best-documented early hominid. The behaviour of the Australopithecus portrayed in the series was modelled on chimpanzees and was particularly inspired by the chimpanzee research of Jane Goodall.

The BBC referred to Walking with Cavemen as one of its "most ambitious TV science projects". In total, the series cost £4 million to make. It was the first instalment in the Walking with... franchise to not involve Tim Haines, the creator of the franchise. Walking with Cavemen was instead created by Richard Dale, who served as executive producer and director, and Peter Georgi, who served as series producer. Both Dale and Georgi had a background in documentary filmmaking and had, among other projects, previously worked together on the 2001 documentary film The Human Body.

=== Casting and hominin costumes ===
Behind-the-scenes photographs of actress Suzanne Cave's "transformation" through makeup and prosthetics into a female Homo ergaster

Although prehistoric animals had been created mostly through computer graphics in Walking with Dinosaurs and Walking with Beasts, it was difficult to produce hominins through this method that were realistic in appearance, expression and movement. In particular no amount of computer graphics would have been able to convincingly portray emotions and allow audiences to determine how the hominins were feeling from looking in their eyes. Failure to convincingly portray human movement and expressions would have broken the "magic" Walking with Cavemen sought to create. As a result, the production team decided to use actors in makeup and prosthetics to portray human ancestors. Over 2,000 actors applied to join the series, out of which fourteen were selected. The fourteen actors had to spend five weeks with scientific experts as well as movement and voice coaches to recreate the early hominins. The complicated training programme was deemed to be necessary since an actor acting in the wrong way would easily have broken the illusion of the programme.

Using actors presented a challenge since special effects had to be employed to change the look of both their faces and their bodies to match the appearance of the hominins they were portraying. The costumes were created using the best available scientific evidence. A massive amount of prosthetics, well over 1,500 pieces, were created and used during filming alongside other components and animatronics. The makeup effects were created by David White and Sacha Carter (Altered States FX) and the prosthetics were created by numerous artists, including Nik Williams, Matthew Smith (Animated Extras) and Barrie Gower (BGFX). The makeup process for the actors took five hours every morning of filming and some of the costumes made it difficult to perform tasks unrelated to the programme; actors in Paranthropus boisei costumes for instance found it difficult to eat their lunch and drinking was a problem in most of the costumes. Many actors used straws for all drinks.

During promotion of the series, the BBC did a publicity photoshoot with the actors David Rubin and Suzanne Cave, who among other roles portrayed elder male and female Homo ergaster, respectively.

Like The Giant Claw (2002) and Land of Giants (2003), special episodes of Walking with Dinosaurs, Walking with Cavemen includes a presenter rather than simply a narrator. The series is presented by the British researcher Robert Winston, who had previously hosted other BBC series on humans, such as Your Life in Their Hands (1979–1987), The Human Body (1998) and Child of Our Time (2000–2020). The American version of the programme replaced Winston's narration and appearances and was originally going to be hosted by Nigel Marven, who previously appeared in episodes of Walking with Dinosaurs and in the series Sea Monsters, but the production team eventually instead created a version hosted by the actor Alec Baldwin. The Alec Baldwin-hosted edit is a two-part special, each part approximately 50 minutes in length. Another two-part edit of Walking with Cavemen, available on some DVD releases, is narrated by British actor Andrew Sachs, who does not appear on camera.

=== Filming ===
Most of the footage of Walking with Cavemen was shot on location. The series was filmed over 41 days. The vast majority of the filming days, 29 days, were spent in South Africa; the other locations were Iceland (four days), Yorkshire (two days), Tunbridge Wells (one day) and the studio (five days). These locations in turn often included separate locations were up to four different units shot footage at the same time. In South Africa, Walking with Cavemen footage was filmed in the Southern Kalahari Desert, the Augrabies Falls National Park and the Orange River regions.

Filming in the Southern Kalahari Desert proved problematic for the actors, since temperatures could reach 30/40 °C (86/104 °F) and they wore full makeup and bodysuits. The team was as a result constantly accompanied by medical professionals who provided the actors with rehydrating solutions and salts.

== Episodes ==
No.	Title	Time period and location	Directed by	Original release date	U.K. viewers (millions)
1	"First Ancestors"	Ethiopia, 8 mya and 3.2 mya	Richard Dale	27 March 2003	7.63
In the first episode, we see Australopithecus afarensis, and focus on their evolved bipedality due to climate change that started in the ocean. The story follows the famous Lucy and her relatives, as they first develop a leadership conflict following the death of the alpha male due to a crocodile attack, and then are attacked by a rival troop. The attack ends with the death of Lucy herself, and her eldest daughter caring for Lucy's now-orphaned baby sibling, as a sign of the developing humanity in these "apemen". Also shown are the unknown arboreal ancestors of humans that lived 8 million years ago.
2	"Blood Brothers"	East Africa, 2 mya	Richard Dale	3 April 2003	6.21
The second episode leaps forward to a time when Paranthropus boisei, Homo habilis and Homo rudolfensis co-exist. H. habilis is depicted as an intelligent omnivore that is more adaptable than the herbivorous P. boisei. The two species are contrasted, with H. habilis being "a jack of all trades", while P. boisei are "a master of one" - i.e. they are specialized herbivores while H. habilis are generalized omnivores. Consequently, though P. boisei are able to eat termites, tall grasses and hard acacia pods in difficult times, they will not be able to survive in the future, when at the beginning of the next Ice Age the climate will change, and these plants will be gone for good. H. habilis, on the contrary, have become smart by eating fresh carrion and bone marrow among other things, and evolving a basic social behaviour, which is more firm than that of P. boisei, will continue to survive, until it evolves into Homo ergaster, seen in the next episode, who has developed these traits to a greater extent. The episode also briefly shows the H. rudolfensis, remarking that although they are taller, they are very similar to the H. habilis.
3	"Savage Family"	Southern Africa and China, 1.5 mya–500,000 ya	Richard Dale	10 April 2003	N/A (<4.88) (Note: Not reported in the weekly top 15 programmes for four-screen viewer ratings.)
In the third episode, Homo ergaster is depicted as the first creature to master the art of tracking. This was made possible because their diet has grown increasingly more carnivorous, and the nutrients in meat made them even smarter than H. habilis of the previous episode. They also begin to form into tribal societies, with genuine bonds between their men and women, though violence is still occurring. As H. ergaster no longer use their arms to walk or climb trees, the muscles of their chests enable them to issue particular sounds, a primitive language. They are seen attaching symbolic importance to objects such as a crocodile tooth. The episode later shows H. ergaster spreading into Asia, becoming Homo erectus and encountering the enormous herbivorous ape Gigantopithecus, "the original King Kong". However, for the next million years, H. ergaster are shown harnessing the fire that will give them opportunity to contemplate at night and beginning to break away from their direct dependence on their environment.
4	"The Survivors"	Europe and Africa, 400,000 ya–30,000 ya	Richard Dale	17 April 2003	N/A (<4.86)
The fourth episode first shows Homo heidelbergensis in Britain. H. heidelbergensis is depicted as intelligent and sensitive but lacking in the ability to comprehend an afterlife, or anything that isn't in the "here and now". When one of them is mortally wounded by a Megaloceros, the others leave his body to the elements. Next, the episode shows a clan of Neanderthals, how they lived and hunted, including the mighty mammoth during the last ice age. It is explained that the Neanderthals lack abstract thought (while they laugh at humorous situations, they cannot create imaginative jokes). Nevertheless, they still devise clever ways of hunting mammoths such as tossing a boulder off a cliff to trap one. Finally in Africa we see modern Humans, who had to become imaginative and inventive to survive a long drought and finally glimpse the cave painters of Europe, who had developed the idea of the afterlife and the supernatural, and are now ready to start human history as it is now known, and to drive the Neanderthals to extinction.

== Reception ==
=== Scientific and critical response ===
The British anthropologist Clive Gamble gave Walking with Cavemen a positive review in the scientific journal Nature. Though finding several details questionable, such as Neanderthals being described as lacking imagination and not wearing boots, Homo ergaster not being black-skinned, and monogamy being showcased as a norm rather than a more recent concept, Gamble also felt that such criticisms missed the point of the programme. Gamble concluded that the point of the series was to introduce a wider audience to the scientific understanding of human evolution through keeping drama rather than scientific debate as the driving force and that the series had succeeded in this purpose. Gamble also enjoyed the inclusion of Robert Winston as presenter, referring to him as a "Dr Who of human evolution" who travelled through time and offered factoids and insight.

Writing for the Archaeological Institute of America, the British archaeologist Paul Bahn also gave the series a positive review, praising the workmanship that went into creating the costumes and calling the landscapes featured "spectacular". Bahn noted that most of what is shown in the series is pure speculation but considered Walking with Cavemen to be "well worth a look" and particularly praised how it made humanity's long dead ancestors feel "more real and alive".

Lynne Heffley of the Los Angeles Times also praised Walking with Cavemen, calling it a "fascinating exploration of human evolution". Heffley noted that the narrative at times grew "a tad overheated" and that "stiffly moving mouths" could detract from the otherwise excellent prosthetics but still considered the series an impressive effort "well worth the trip". The Australia-based British broadcaster Alan Saunders criticized the series for various events throughout being referred to as milestones on the path to Homo sapiens, which Saunders interpreted as veering close to suggesting that evolution was a process that would inevitably have led to modern humans.

=== Popular response ===
In 2003, BBC News hosted a debate section where viewers could share their views on Walking with Cavemen, which attracted both positive and negative user responses. The negative user responses outweighed the positive ones, with some users being concerned that much of the programme appeared to be conjecture and that Robert Winston, or the programme as a whole, were dumbing down the science or "patronising" viewers. Some viewers found the hominin suits to be unconvincing and drew unfavourable comparisons to the original Planet of the Apes films. Several users also criticized the programme for presenting evolution as fact instead of considering the (pseudoscientific) idea of intelligent design. In an interview, Robert Winston dismissed fears of dumbing down the science, stating that "We are making it exciting, we are bringing science alive, and I absolutely disagree with the notion of dumbing down." Positive user responses mentioned that the programme made otherwise obscure science more accessible to the masses and praised the series combining a scientific and humanistic approach. Some users also praised the effects, including the hominin costumes, and the writing.

== In other media ==
=== Companion book ===
A companion book to the series, titled Walking with Cavemen: Stand Eye-to-Eye with your Ancestors, was co-authored by the photographer (and executive editor on the series) John Lynch and the professor of psychology and human evolution researcher Louise Barrett. The book is a coffee-table book which explores mankind's origins in a similar vein as the series, mixing imagined anecdotes and scientific fact together and using stills from the series to bring the ancient hominins to life. The book was reviewed positively in the book review magazine Publishers Weekly, which considered the book to have been "competently executed".

=== Interactive version ===
Using BBCi (BBC Interactive Television), viewers could during the programme's original airing watch Walking with Cavemen with additional layers of factual evidence, such as facts about fossils and comprehensive summaries of the science behind every episode. After every episode, the evidence shown would be drawn together into a 10-minute exclusive extra documentary.

=== Website ===
An accompanying website to the series was launched in 2003, intended to act as a "stand-alone resource in its own right". The website included fact files on every hominin, family trees, summaries of the episodes, behind-the-scenes information and a flash game, Ape to Man, in which players played through seven tasks, each representing a milestone in human evolution.

== See also ==
- A Species Odyssey a similar program on France 3
- Before We Ruled the Earth a two-part documentary aired on Discovery Channel
