= Minchenden Grammar School =

Former school in Southgate, London, England

Minchenden School Minchenden Grammar School

Location
- High Street; Southgate, London; England
- Coordinates: 51.63035°N 0.12952°W

Information
- Motto: Robur durabit
- Established: 1919
- Closed: 1984
- Local authority: Middlesex (1919-1965); Enfield (1965-1984)
- Gender: Coeducational
- Age: 11 to 18
- Colour: Green
- Website: http://www.minchenden.org/

Minchenden School was a mixed secondary school situated in Southgate, North London, established in 1919 with 90 pupils. It merged with Arnos School in 1984.

== History ==
The school was established in 1919 in Tottenhall Road as a mixed secondary school. In 1924, it moved to Southgate House, where it remained until 1987. The staff and pupils built an observatory. From 1960 to the early 1980s, there was an annexe in the Fox Lane school, Palmers Green. The annexe catered for the 1st 2 years of pupils. The school's English department was particularly strong. Head of English Douglas Barnes 1959-1966 introduced a series of important innovations in teaching methods. In 1967, Minchenden Grammar School was converted from a grammar school to Minchenden School, a comprehensive school, with the upper school in High Street and the lower school in Fox Lane. It was merged with Arnos School in 1984 to form Broomfield School, after the Conservative council sold the extensive playing fields to a development company to build homes, with the original Southgate House protected as a Grade I listed building.

The building is now used by Durants School, having previously been used by Southgate College.

== Former teachers ==
- James Kirkup, poet

== Notable alumni ==
- Graham Robert Allan, mathematician and an expert on Banach algebras, Professor of Pure Mathematics from 1970 to 1978 at the University of Leeds
- Neville Brody (born 1957), graphic designer, typographer and art director
- Prof. Harold Brookfield (1926-2022), scholar of rural development, Australian National University
- Prof Peter Clarricoats CBE, Professor of Electronic Engineering from 1968 to 1997 at Queen Mary and Westfield, and vice-president from 1989 to 1991 of the Institution of Electrical Engineers (since 2006 the Institution of Engineering and Technology) Fellow of the Royal Society (1990)
- Nick Dunning, actor - credits include The Tudors, My Boy Jack, Alexander
- Judy Dyble (1949–2020), Singer songwriter and founder member of Fairport Convention
- Irving Finkel (born 1951), philologist and Assyriologist
- Professor Brian J Ford (born 1939), scientist, author, broadcaster and lecturer
- Lynne Franks (born 1948), public relations innovator
- Judy Fryd (1909–2000), political campaigner
- Hazel Genn (born 1949), legal academic
- Anthony Giddens, Baron Giddens (born 1938), sociologist, Director from 1997 to 2003 of the London School of Economics
- John Hodge (1929–2021), engineer and NASA flight director
- Jana Jeruma-Grinberga (born 1953) former bishop in the Lutheran Church
- Peter Kellner (born 1946), journalist and political commentator
- William Orbit (born 1956), musician, composer and record producer
- Chris Pond (born 1952), Labour MP from 1997 to 2005 for Gravesham
- David Puttnam, Baron Puttnam (born 1941), film producer and politician
- Martin Rushent (born 1948), record producer
- Peter Sallis (1921–2017), actor
- Sir Peter Soulsby (born 1948), mayor of Leicester and former Labour MP for Leicester South
- Barry Took (1928–2002), comedian, writer and television presenter
- John Wimpenny (1922–2015), aerodynamicist and holder of the world record for man-powered flight for ten years from 1962, when he flew the Hatfield Puffin over a distance of 995 yards.
