= Judy Fryd =

British disability rights activist

- Born: Caroline Joyce Manning; 31 October 1909; Hornsey, London, U.K.
- Died: 4 October 2000 (aged 90)
- Education: Minchenden Grammar School; Ruskin College, Oxford (BSc (Econ))
- Occupation: Disabled rights activist
- Spouse: John Fryd
- Relatives: Felicity Fryd (daughter)

Judy Fryd (born Caroline Joyce Manning; 31 October 1909 – 4 October 2000 in Hornsey, London) was a British campaigner for mentally disabled children and the founder of The National Association of Parents of Backward Children, now Mencap. Throughout her life, she worked to increase awareness of learning disabilities and greater consideration for learning disabled individuals. Through the founding of her charity, she cemented this ethos, with the movement for greater aid to be given to those with learning disabilities continuing through the work of Mencap.

== Early life and education ==
Caroline Joyce Manning, known as Judy, was born on 31 October 1909. Judy grew up in London and went to Minchenden Grammar School before going on to study Economics and Political Science at Ruskin College, Oxford. While at Ruskin College Judy met John Fryd who she later married in 1936, before they moved to Leeds. The couple were very active members of the Labour Party throughout their lives and were associated with many other charities and organisations.

== Mencap ==
Once relocated to Leeds, Judy and John had four children: Felicity, Patricia, Peter and Linda. Felicity, their oldest (born in 1938), had a learning disability and this sparked Judy's realisation that there were no support systems in place to help those with learning disabilities alongside their families. When Felicity was around three, Judy and John realised that "something was not quite right", as their daughter was not able to use her language to communicate in the way that other children her age were. As a result, Felicity was taken to the local Child Guidance Clinic, where she was assessed. The doctor concluded that Felicity had an IQ of 43 and seemed content to leave the matter there, not offering support or solutions as to how best to help Felicity. After several failed attempts to put Felicity into regular education, Judy managed to get Felicity a month's trial at a boarding school for the "mentally handicapped" in Surrey. However, on the first day, Judy and John were informed that Felicity was not suitable for the school owing to her challenging behaviour and were requested to remove her immediately.

Judy was deeply angered and frustrated by the lack of support and provision available. Consequently, in 1946 Judy wrote a letter to Nursery World Magazine asking all parents also having difficulties with a "backward child" to get in contact. More than one thousand parents responded and consequently a group was formed of parents who pleaded their cause to local health and education authorities. This group grew into the Association of Parents of Backward Children (APBC), the forerunner of Mencap.

Much of what Judy achieved came too late to benefit directly her own daughter, Felicity.

Felicity began to realise that she struggled in ways that her brothers and sisters did not and this led to increasingly disturbed behaviour. She was admitted to an ill-suited mental hospital in St Albans at the age of 12 which grouped her with other 'psychotic' individuals who in reality had very different problems to her. These issues persisted until late on in her life as doctors were unable to offer the right support for her needs. Felicity died in 1993 from pneumonia aged 55.

== Later life ==
During the 1950s and 1960s, the Association of Parents of Backward Children, led by Judy, advocated the need for support and the potential of people with learning disabilities. This was largely through their magazine Parents' Voice, of which Judy was the editor. One key achievement for Judy was a campaign that led to the 1964 Education Act. This reversed the previous stance that children with learning disabilities were ineducable, and provided funding for special needs teaching. Since that point, there have been significant improvements in supporting the lives of those with learning disabilities and as put by Mencap's former chief executive Fred Heddell: "It is possible for an autistic person today to form relationships and to lead a much less isolated life".

== Death and legacy ==
Judy Fryd died during October 2000 at the age of 90. Her work carries on through Mencap.

In October 2009 it was announced that she would feature on a new first class Royal Mail postage stamp.

In March 2026, Historic England honoured Fryd with a blue plaque on her former home at 8 Westfield Avenue, Harpenden.
