= Peter Clarricoats =

British engineer (1932–2020)

Professor Peter Clarricoats CBE FRS FREng

Professor of Electronic Engineering, Queen Mary (and Westfield) College, London
- In office 1968–1997

Personal details
- Born: Peter John Bell Clarricoats; 6 April 1932 Southgate, London, England
- Died: 17 January 2020 (aged 87)

Peter John Bell Clarricoats (6 April 1932 – 17 January 2020) was a British engineer who was Professor of Electronic Engineering at Queen Mary, University of London.

== Early life and education ==
Clarricoats was born in 1932 in Southgate, London, the youngest of the three children of John and Cecilia Clarricoats. His father was Secretary of the Radio Society of Great Britain. He was educated at Minchenden Grammar School and Imperial College London. He graduated BSc in 1953 and received his PhD from the University of London in 1958, with a thesis entitled "Properties of waveguides containing ferrites with special reference to waveguides of circular cross-section".

== Academic career ==
Clarricoats began his academic career in 1959 as a lecturer at Queen’s University Belfast, followed by a move in 1961 to the University of Sheffield. He was appointed as a professor at the University of Leeds in 1963, which made him the youngest professor in his field at the time. He was then Professor of Electronic Engineering at Queen Mary, University of London from 1968 to 1997. He was head of the Department of Electronic Engineering between 1979 and 1995 and served as Dean of Engineering between 1977 and 1980.

Clarricoats was vice-president of the Institution of Electrical Engineers, from 1989 to 1991. He was vice-president and treasurer of URSI (the International Union of Radio Science) from 1993 to 1999.

From 1995 to 1997 he was a director of Filtronic plc, and in 1998 became chair of the Technology Advisory board of Filtronic.

== Honours ==
Clarricoats was appointed a Fellow at the Royal Academy of Engineering in 1983. He was elected a Fellow of the Royal Society (FRS) in 1990 and appointed Commander of the Order of the British Empire (CBE) for "services to the Ministry of Defence" in the 1996 Birthday Honours.

In September 2015 Clarricoats was awarded the Sir Frank Whittle medal of the Royal Academy of Engineering, one of the academy's highest accolades.

== Death ==
Clarricoats died on 17 January 2020 after a short illness at the age of 87.

== Works ==
- Microwave Ferrites, Wiley, 1961
- Corrugated Horns for Microwave Antennas. IET. 1984. ISBN 978-0-86341-003-1.
- Microwave Horns and Feeds (1994)
