= Robert Winston, Baron Winston =

British scientist (born 1940)

The Right Honourable The Lord Winston FMedSci FRSA FRCP FRCOG FRSB HonFREng
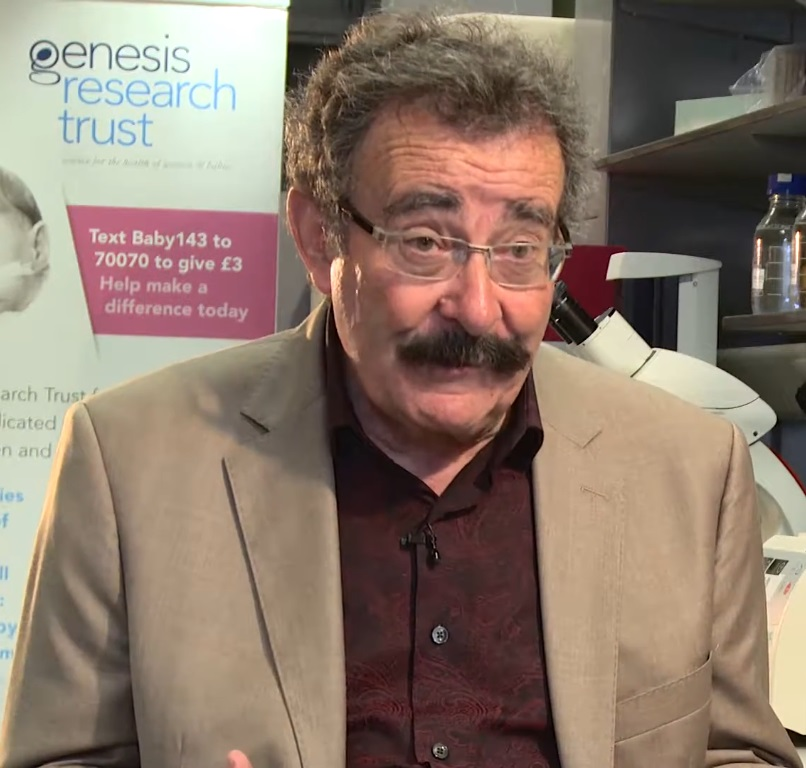
- Winston in 2017

Chancellor of Sheffield Hallam University
- In office 2001 – 26 July 2018
- Preceded by: Bryan Nicholson
- Succeeded by: Helena Kennedy, Baroness Kennedy of The Shaws

Member of the House of Lords
- Lord Temporal
- Life peerage 18 December 1995

Personal details
- Born: Robert Maurice Lipson Winston; 15 July 1940 (age 86) London, England
- Party: Labour
- Spouse: Lira Feigenbaum (m. 1973; died 2021)
- Children: 3, including Ben Winston
- Education: London Hospital Medical College
- Occupation: Surgeon; scientist; television presenter; politician; peer
- Website: robertwinston.org.uk

Robert Winston's voice
from the BBC programme The Life Scientific, 20 December 2011.

Robert Maurice Lipson Winston, Baron Winston (born 15 July 1940) is a British professor, medical doctor, scientist, television presenter, and Labour peer.

== Early life ==
Robert Winston was born in London to Laurence Winston and Ruth Winston-Fox, and brought up as an Orthodox Jew. His mother was mayor of the former borough of Southgate. Winston's father died as a result of medical negligence when Winston was nine years old. Robert has two younger siblings: a sister, the artist Willow Winston, and a brother.

Winston has described his Judaism as central to his life and has said that he does not work on Shabbat.

Winston attended firstly Salcombe Preparatory School until the age of seven, followed by Colet Court and St Paul's School, later graduating from the London Hospital Medical College in 1964 with a degree in medicine and surgery. He achieved prominence as an expert in human fertility. For a brief time, he gave up clinical medicine and worked as a theatre director, winning the National Directors' Award at the Edinburgh Festival in 1969.

== Medical career ==
Winston joined Hammersmith Hospital in the capacity of registrar in 1970 as a Wellcome Research Fellow. He became an associate professor at the Catholic University of Leuven, Belgium, in 1975. Between 1975 and 1977, he was a scientific advisor to the World Health Organization's programme in human reproduction, after which he joined the Royal Postgraduate Medical School (based at Hammersmith Hospital) as a consultant and reader in 1977.

After conducting research as a professor of gynaecology at the University of Texas Health Science Center at San Antonio in 1980, he returned to the UK to run the IVF service set up at Hammersmith Hospital, which pioneered various improvements in this technology, becoming Dean of the Institute of Obstetrics and Gynaecology until its merger with Imperial College in 1997. He was the director of NHS Research and Development at the Hammersmith Hospitals Trust until 1994. As a professor of fertility studies at Hammersmith, Winston led the IVF team that pioneered pre-implantation genetic diagnosis to identify defects in human embryos and published early work on gene expression in human embryos. He developed tubal microsurgery and various techniques in reproductive surgery, including sterilisation reversal. He performed the world's first fallopian tubal transplant in 1979, a technology that was later superseded by in vitro fertilisation. Together with Alan Handyside in 1990, his research group pioneered the techniques of pre-implantation diagnosis, enabling screening of human embryos to prevent numerous genetic diseases.

Winston was the president of the British Association for the Advancement of Science from 2004 to 2005. Together with Carol Readhead of the California Institute of Technology, he researched male germ cell stem cells and methods for their genetic modification at the Institute of Reproductive and Developmental Biology, Imperial College London. He has published over 300 scientific papers in peer-reviewed journals.

Winston was appointed to a new chair at Imperial College—Professor of Science and Society—and is also emeritus professor of fertility studies there. He was chairman of the Institute of Obstetrics and Gynaecology Trust and chairs the Women-for-Women Appeal. This charitable trust, which has raised over £80 million for research into reproductive diseases, was renamed the Genesis Research Trust in 1997. From 2001 to 2018, he was chancellor of Sheffield Hallam University.

Winston is a fellow of the Academy of Medical Sciences, an honorary fellow of the Royal Academy of Engineering, a fellow of the Royal College of Obstetricians and Gynaecologists and of the Royal College of Physicians of London, and an honorary fellow of the Royal College of Surgeons of Edinburgh, the Royal College of Physicians and Surgeons of Glasgow, and the Royal Society of Biology. He holds honorary doctorates from twenty-three universities, is a trustee of the UK Stem Cell Foundation, and a patron of the Liggins Institute, University of Auckland, New Zealand.

=== Opinions ===
==== Fertility treatment ====
Winston holds strong views about the commercialisation of fertility treatment. He believes that ineffective treatments result in great anguish to couples and is alarmed that so many treatments for the symptom of infertility are carried out before proper investigation and diagnosis have been made. He is also sceptical about the effectiveness of current methods for screening human embryos to assess their viability.

==== Gender identity ====
During the House of Lords debate on the 2004 Gender Recognition Act, Winston offered a scientific argument in favour of the act, explaining that "There are so many different fluctuations in this broad spectrum of sexuality that I urge the House to be very cautious about defining it in terms of chromosomal, genital or any other simple definition. It simply is not medically just, and I am sure that it would produce bad law."

More recently, Winston has described gender-affirming surgery as "mutilation" and asserted that "we can remove bits of our body and change our shape and so on but you can't change your sex because that is embedded in your genes in every cell of your body".

==== Science as truth ====
Winston has said, "I think there has to be a clear understanding that science is not the truth. It's a version of the truth."

== Media career ==
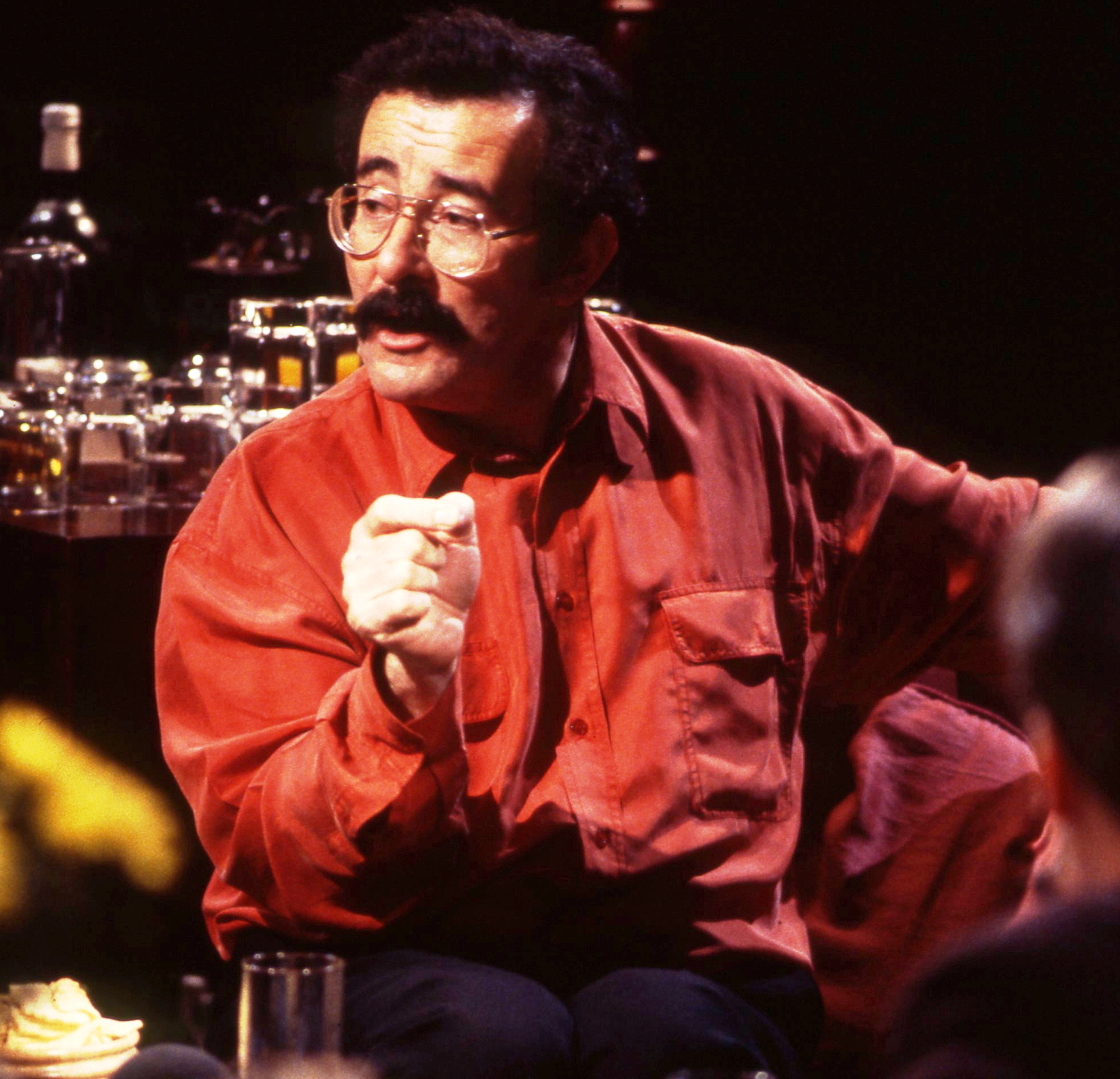
Appearing on After Dark in 1994

Winston has been the presenter of many BBC television series, including Your Life in Their Hands, Making Babies, Superhuman, The Secret Life of Twins, Child of Our Time, Human Instinct, The Human Mind, Frontiers of Medicine, The Story of God, and the BAFTA award-winner The Human Body.

In 2003, he presented the BBC documentary Walking with Cavemen, a series that introduced some controversial views about early humans but was endorsed by anthropologists and scientists. One of its theories was that Homo sapiens have a uniquely developed imagination that helped them to survive.

Winston's documentary Threads of Life won the international science film prize in Paris in 2005. His BBC series Child Against All Odds explored ethical questions raised by IVF treatment. In 2008, he presented Super Doctors, about decisions made in frontier medicine.

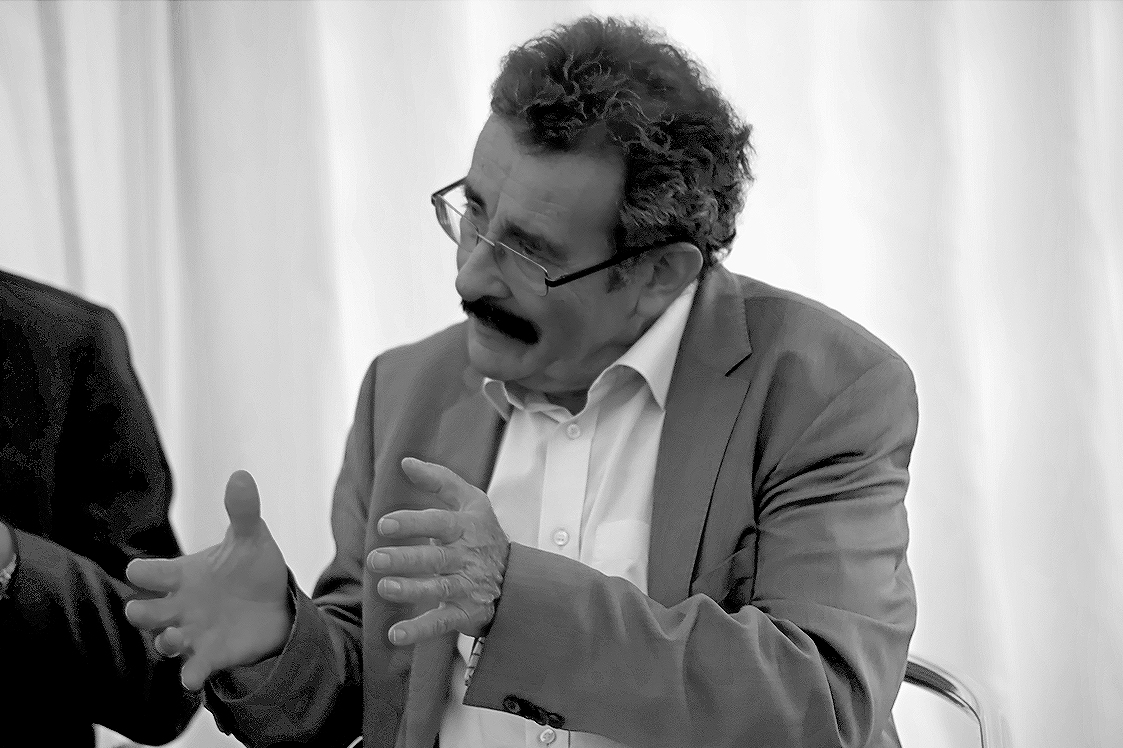
Winston at the Cheltenham Science Festival in 2011

In 2007, Winston appeared in the TV series Play It Again, in which he attempted to learn to play the saxophone, despite not having played a musical instrument since the age of 11, when he learned the recorder.

Among many BBC Radio 4 programmes, he has appeared on The Archers radio soap as a fertility consultant. He has regularly appeared on The Wright Stuff as a panellist as well as on numerous chat show programmes, such as Have I Got News for You, This Morning, The One Show, and various political programmes such as Question Time and Any Questions. Winston is featured in the 2011 Symphony of Science episode "Ode to the Brain".

== Political career ==
Winston was made a life peer on 18 December 1995 as Baron Winston, of Hammersmith in the London Borough of Hammersmith and Fulham. He sits on the Labour Party benches in the House of Lords as that party's whip. He speaks on topics of education, science, medicine, and the arts. He was chairman of the House of Lords Select Committee on Science and Technology and is a board member and vice-chairman of the Parliamentary Office of Science and Technology, which provides advice to both houses of Parliament.

On 31 July 2025, he was a signatory of a letter from 38 House of Lords members opposing the UK's plan to recognise a state of Palestine: the peers said Palestine "does not meet the international law criteria for recognition of a state, namely, defined territory, a permanent population, an effective government and the capacity to enter into relations with other states".

Winston has made a number of claims suggesting that segregated cycle lanes cause greater air pollution and emissions in Central London. He is a member of the Centre for Data Ethics and Innovation, an advisory board created in 2019 and sponsored by the Department for Digital, Culture, Media and Sport, which works on ethical and innovative deployment of data-enabled technologies, including artificial intelligence.

== Personal life ==
In 1973, Winston married Lira Helen Feigenbaum (8 August 1949 – 9 December 2021). They have three children, including Ben, who is a film and TV producer and director. Winston is a fellow of the Royal Society of Arts, a former vice-president of the Royal College of Music, and a member of the Garrick Club, the MCC, and the Athenaeum Club in London.

He was a council member of the Imperial Cancer Research Fund and Cancer Research UK, and until 2013, of the Engineering and Physical Sciences Research Council, where he chaired the Societal Issues Panel. He regularly gives public lectures on scientific subjects and has helped promote science literacy and education by founding the Reach Out Laboratory at Imperial College, which brings schoolchildren of all ages into the university on a daily basis to do practical science and to debate issues that science and technology raise. Extending this school outreach activity, he acts as ambassador for outreach for the president of Imperial College, visiting schools across England to discuss scientific issues and career aspirations with students.

== Current posts ==
- Professor of Science and Society, Imperial College London
- Emeritus Professor of Fertility Studies, Imperial College London
- Chairman of the Genesis Research Trust
- Founding member and co-chair with Ruth Armon of the UK-Israel Science Council (since 2017)

== Selected former posts ==
- Chairman of the Council, Royal College of Music 2007–2017
- Council Member, University of Surrey, until 2018

== Selected honours and awards ==
- Cedric Carter Medal, Clinical Genetics Society, 1993
- Victor Bonney Medal for contributions to surgery, Royal College of Surgeons, 1993
- Gold medallist, Royal Society of Health, 1998
- Fellow of the Academy of Medical Sciences (FMedSci), 1998
- British Medical Association Gold Award for Medicine in the Media, 1999
- Michael Faraday Prize, Royal Society, 1999
- Edwin Stevens Medal (the Royal Society of Medicine), 2003
- Aventis Prize, Royal Society, 2004
- Al-Hammadi Medal, Royal College of Surgeons of Edinburgh, 2005
- Honoured by the City of Westminster at a Marylebone tree planting ceremony in July 2011
- Honorary fellow of the Royal Academy of Engineering in 2008

=== Honorary degrees ===
Winston has received at least 23 honorary degrees. These include:

Location	Date	School	Honorary doctorate
England	14 July 2003	University of Sunderland	Doctor of Science (D.Sc.)
England	8 September 2003	University of Salford	Doctorate
England	2004	Solent University	Doctor of Technology (D.Tech.)
England	2005	Lancaster University	Doctor of Science (D.Sc.)
England		University of Manchester Institute of Science and Technology	Doctor of Science (D.Sc.)
Scotland	5 July 2010	University of Aberdeen	Doctor of Science (D.Sc.)
England	22 July 2011	Loughborough University	Doctor of Science (D.Sc.)
England	5 September 2014	Birmingham City University	Doctorate
Israel	5 November 2015	Weizmann Institute of Science	Doctor of Philosophy (Ph.D.)

== Television documentaries ==
- Your Life in Their Hands, BBC (1979–1987)
- Making Babies, BBC (1995)
- The Human Body, BBC, which went by the name Intimate Universe: The Human Body in the United States (1998). The series won three BAFTA Awards.
- The Secret Life of Twins, BBC (1999)
- Child of Our Time, following the lives of a group of children, all born in 2000, as they grow to the age of 20; BBC (2000–2017)
- Superhuman, BBC (2001)
- Walking with Cavemen, BBC (2003)
- Human Instinct, BBC (2002)
- The Human Mind, BBC (2003)
- Threads of Life, BBC (2003)
- How to Sleep Better, BBC (2005)
- The Story of God, BBC (2005)
- How to Improve Your Memory, BBC (2006)
- A Child Against All Odds, BBC (2006)
- Super Doctors, BBC (2008)
- How Science Changed Our World, BBC (2010)
- Inside Britain's Fertility Business, BBC (2016)

== Selected published work ==
- "Reversibility of Female Sterilization" (1978)
- Co-author, "Tubal Infertility" (1981)
- Infertility – a sympathetic approach (1985)
- "Getting Pregnant" (1989)
- "Making Babies" (1996)
- The IVF Revolution (1999)
- Superhuman (2000)
- Human Instinct (2003)
- The Human Mind (2004), shortlisted for Royal Society Aventis Prize
- What Makes Me Me (2005), winner, Royal Society young people's book prize
- Human (2005), BMA Award for best popular medicine book
- The Story of God (2005) ISBN 0-593-05493-8
- "Body" (2005)
- "When Science Meets God", BBC News, 2 December 2005
- "Why Do We Believe in God?", The Guardian, 13 October 2005
- A Child Against All Odds (2006)
- Play It Again (2007)
- It's Elementary (2007)
- Evolution Revolution (2009)
- "What Goes on Inside My head" (2010)
- "Science Year by Year" (2011)
- That's Life (2012)
- Bad Ideas? An Arresting History of Our Inventions (2010)
- Utterly Amazing Science (2014), winner, Royal Society young people's book prize
- "Utterly Amazing Body" (2015)
- "The Essential Fertility Guide" (2015)

Academic offices
Preceded by Bryan Nicholson	Chancellor of Sheffield Hallam University; 2001-2018	Succeeded by Helena Kennedy
Orders of precedence in the United Kingdom
Preceded by The Lord Blyth of Rowington	Gentlemen; Baron Winston	Followed by The Lord Wallace of Saltaire
