= How Science Changed Our World =

How Science Changed Our World is a 2010 BBC television documentary presented by Robert Winston (first broadcast on 23 December 2010 on BBC One). It focuses on ten scientific advances, which according to the producers, had the biggest impact on our lives. Viewers were asked to vote on their favourite advancement.

== Breakthroughs ==
1. Combined oral contraceptive pill
2. Microchip
3. Magnetic resonance imaging
4. Laser
5. Biomechanics
6. World Wide Web
7. Big Bang theory (Robert Winston's choice)
8. Human Genome Project
9. Stem cell research
10. In vitro fertilisation

== Credits ==
- Series Producer: Sophie Todd
- Presenter: Robert Winston
- Producer: Naomi Austin

== Results of the Viewer Poll ==
With 23000 votes.

1. Microchip (37.3%)
2. World Wide Web (18.7%)
3. Stem cell research (14.3%)
4. Human Genome Project (10%)
5. Laser (6.2%)
6. Big Bang theory (6.1%)
7. Magnetic resonance imaging (3.9%)
8. In vitro fertilisation (2.8%)
9. Combined oral contraceptive pill (2.7%)
10. Biomechanics (2.1%)

(These results have not been confirmed but are deemed reliable.)
