= John Wimpenny =

English aeronautical engineer

John C. Wimpenny, CEng, FRAeS
- Born: 3 December 1922; London, England
- Died: 27 April 2015; Hertfordshire, England
- Occupation: Aerodynamicist
- Years active: 1940-1984
- Known for: Record-breaking flight in the Puffin

John Wimpenny (3 December 1922 – 27 April 2015) was an English aeronautical engineer who held the record for the longest human powered flight.

== Career ==
Wimpenny was born in London, growing up in Palmers Green and Winchmore Hill. He attended Minchenden Grammar School in Southgate and in 1958 he moved to St Albans, Hertfordshire, where he lived for the rest of his life.

John Wimpenny's career as an aeronautical engineer began at the de Havilland Aircraft Company in Hatfield, Hertfordshire, in October 1940, and he went on to work on the Mosquito, Tiger Moth, Hornet, Vampire and Comet aircraft projects, becoming Deputy Chief Aerodynamicist in 1957. He later worked for Hawker Siddeley Aviation in the capacity of Chief Research Engineer from 1965. He worked on the development of the Hawker Siddeley HS 125 executive jet and on civil STOL and V/STOL design in co-operation with the Dornier Aircraft Company in Germany. He was promoted to the position of Director of Research at Hawker Siddeley in Hatfield and later became Executive Director of Research at British Aerospace in Kingston upon Thames.

== Human-powered aircraft ==
The Hatfield Puffin, a human-powered aircraft intended for an attempt at the Kremer prize, was designed by a team headed by John Wimpenny, by then an aerodynamicist, and built by volunteers at the de Havilland Aircraft Company in Hatfield, Hertfordshire, UK.

== Record-breaking flight in the Puffin ==
On 2 May 1962, Wimpenny, aged 39, piloted the Puffin, pedalling like a cyclist to make the propeller drive the aircraft, and he achieved a flight distance of 993 yards, then a world record which was to stand for ten years.

== Later life ==
John Wimpenny was visiting professor for undergraduate research projects at City University London from 1990 to 1999 and he was vice-chairman of the Royal Aeronautical Society's Human Powered Aircraft Group from 1995 until his death.

== Honours and awards ==
1976 Hodgson Prize for his paper on 'Costs and Decision-Making'

1978 Royal Aeronautical Society Silver Medal for his many important contributions in practical aeronautics

1983 Hodgson Prize for his paper 'Aircraft R and D in Europe - A Perspective View'

== See also ==
- Derek Piggott
- SUMPAC
