= The Story of God =

2005 British television documentary series

The Story of God is a three-part documentary series produced by Dangerous Films and presented by Robert Winston. It first aired on 4, 11, and 18 December 2005 on BBC One and was rebroadcast by the Canadian Broadcasting Corporation in May and June 2006 and by the Australian Broadcasting Corporation in April 2007.

The Story of God explores the origins of religion, focusing on the three Abrahamic faiths, and discusses belief in God in a scientific age. The series included a number of interviews with scientists, including Dean Hamer, Richard Dawkins, and members of the CERN programme.

During the documentary, Winston debates notable creationist Ken Ham, visiting the creation museum where, he states, "scientific facts are ignored in favour of religious certainty". He presents his view that science and religion have an important role in human development, but that absolute certainty in either "can lead to serious problems".

Winston also wrote a book titled The Story of God, which was published in 2005.

== Episodes ==
1. "Life, the Universe and Everything"
  The first episode focusses on the origins of ancient animistic beliefs and the eastern religions of Hinduism, Buddhism, and Zoroastrianism.
2. "No god but God"
  The second episode focusses on the three monotheistic Abrahamic faiths: Judaism, Christianity, and Islam.
3. "God of the Gaps"
  The third episode considers how the idea of God has been challenged by modern ideas, especially scientific theories and discoveries.
