= Your Life in Their Hands =

BBC TV documentary series about surgery

Your Life in Their Hands is a long-running BBC TV documentary series on the subject of surgery, examining surgical practice from the point of view of both surgeons and patients. Its first run was produced by Bill Duncalf and Mary Adams, consisted of five seasons (1958 to 1964) and was presented by Dr. Charles Fletcher. An early 1970s revival (the first in colour) was presented by Jonathan Miller, and another revival, lasting from 1979 to 1987, was presented by Robert Winston on BBC One. The series was revived again in 1991 for five editions, this time narrated by Andrew Sachs on BBC Two and again in 2004 and 2005 on BBC One with Barbara Flynn as narrator.

== Episodes ==
=== Series 1 ===
The first series was broadcast on 9.30pm Tuesdays between 11 February and 15 April 1958, consisting of 10 half-hour episodes. It began production with the working title 'Eye on Medicine'. The host, Dr. Charles Fletcher, would introduce each episode from Hammersmith Hospital, handing over to the local team in the featured location. Though well received in the mainstream media, the doctors association, BMA decried the publicisation of pathology and surgical treatments. Average viewing figures were 8.25 million.

1. Breath of life – Respiratory paralysis, poliomyelitis – Churchill Hospital, Oxford
2. Ray of hope – cancer and radiotherapy – Christie Hospital and Holt Radium Institute, Manchester
3. A new lease of life – rheumatic fever, mitral stenosis/valvotomy – Queen Elizabeth Hospital, Birmingham
4. Out on a limb – GP hospital – Cottage Hospital, Bude, Cornwall
5. Thought is the seed of action – head injury – Royal Infirmary, Edinburgh
6. The Ever-Lessening Shadow – TB – Sully Hospital, Cardiff
7. Diverting the Stream – Liver cirrhosis – Bristol Royal Infirmary
8. The Fires of Life – Thyroid diseases – Western Infirmary, Glasgow
9. Machinery for Living – Artificial kidney, heart/lung machine – General Infirmary, Leeds
10. Looking to the Future – Chronic bronchitis, pneumoconiosis – Llandough Hospital, Penarth

=== Series 2 ===
This contained six episodes from London hospitals between February and March 1961.

- Gall stones – Charing Cross Hospital

=== Series 3 ===
8 episodes in 1962.

=== Series 4 ===
1963

Depression – St. Thomas' Hospital, London.

=== 2004 edition ===
3 episodes 1. Neurosurgery – featuring surgeon Henry Marsh. (First broadcast 08/03/2004) 2. Liver transplant – featuring surgeon Nigel Heaton. (First broadcast 15/03/2004) 3. Cardiac surgery – featuring surgeon Stephen Westaby. (First broadcast 22/03/2004)

=== 2005 edition ===
1. Neurosurgery – featuring surgeon Christopher Chandler. (First broadcast 27/07/2005) 2. Spinal surgery – featuring surgeon John Hutchinson. (First broadcast 03/08/2005) 3. GI surgery – featuring surgeon Michael Griffin. (First broadcast 11/08/2005)
