= Laurel Park School =

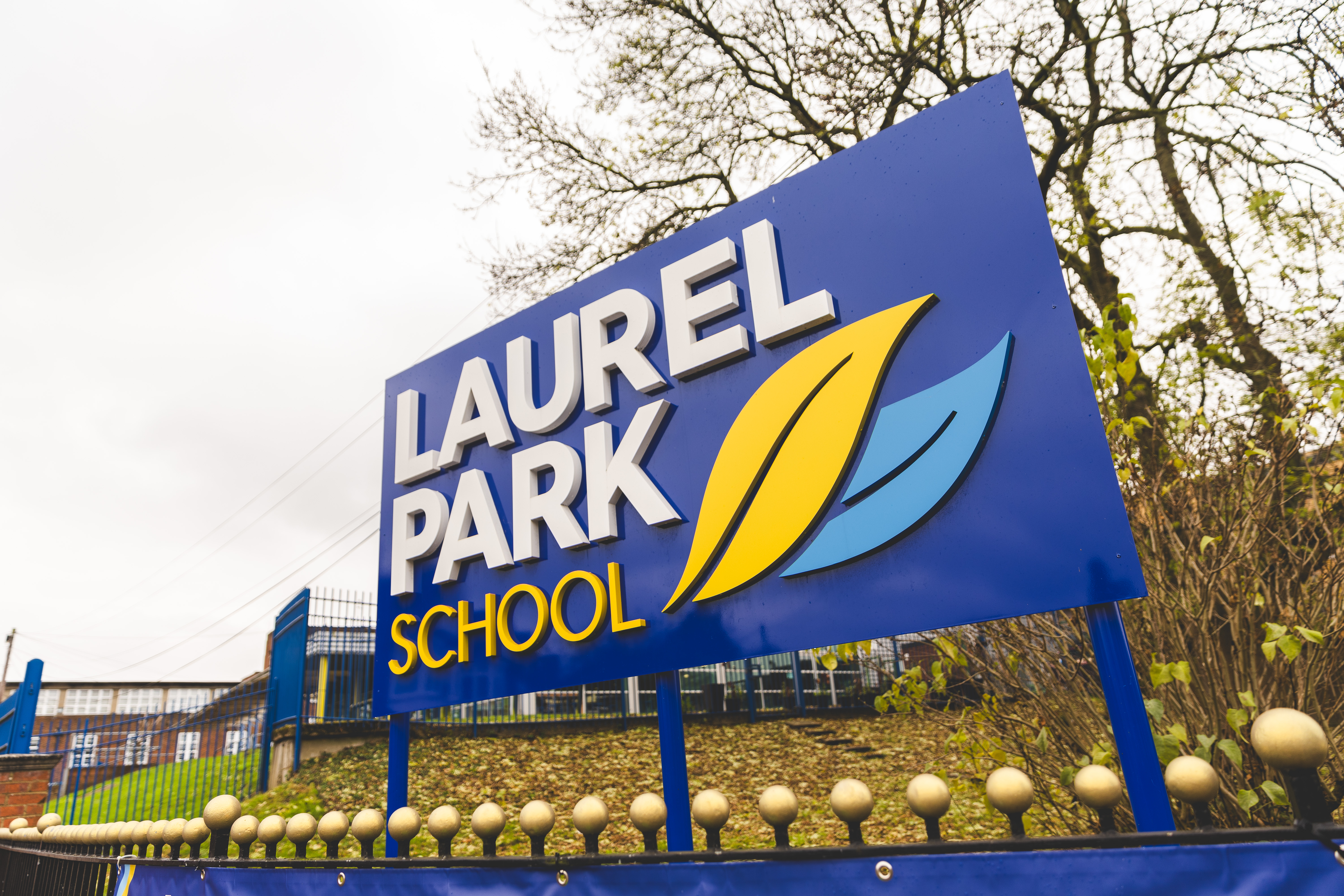
- Laurel Park School (Main Entrance)

Location
- Wilmer Way; Southgate, London, N14 7HY; England; 51°36′55″N 0°07′31″W

Information
- Type: Foundation school
- Motto: Be part of our success
- Established: 1919 (Minchenden); 1938 (Arnos); 1984 (combined school)
- Local authority: Enfield
- Department for Education URN: 102056 Tables
- Ofsted: Reports
- Head Teacher: Adele Christofi
- Gender: Coeducational
- Age: 11 to 16
- Enrollment: 600
- Website: www.laurelparkschool.co.uk

Laurel Park School, formerly Broomfield School, is a comprehensive secondary school located in Arnos Grove, Enfield, Greater London, which resulted from a merger of Arnos School and Minchenden School. The school is entirely located on the old Arnos School site.

== History ==
=== 1919-1984: Arnos and Minchenden ===
Arnos School was founded in 1938 on Laurel Park School's current site and took on the senior pupils of Bowes School, which became solely a primary school. It later became a secondary modern school. Extensions were made to the original site in 1948 and 1957.

Minchenden School began as a mixed secondary school in 1919 in Tottenhall Road, Palmers Green, and moved to Southgate House in 1987. The school also took over the buildings in Fox Lane that had been vacated by the move of Southgate County School to its current site in Sussex Way, Cockfosters. Minchenden became a grammar school, and then in 1967 a comprehensive school.

The Arnos School buildings were further extended in 1964 and 1966. It became a comprehensive school in 1967 with the feeder schools Bowes, Garfield, Oakthorpe, Our Lady of Lourdes Roman Catholic, and St. Michael's Church of England primary schools, and some further extensions were made in 1967, 1969, and 1972. In 1984, Arnos School and Minchenden School were merged to form a new school, located at the Arnos School premises and named Broomfield School.

=== 1984-2023: Broomfield ===
In 2008 Broomfield School received designation as a specialist humanities college. It was, at one time, one of the largest secondary schools in the Borough of Enfield, due to its location near the borders of the neighbouring boroughs of Haringey and Barnet, but since the development of Alexandra Park School in Haringey in 2003, it has steadily lost pupils from its feeder primary schools.

An Ofsted inspection in October 2011 judged the school to be inadequate and placed it into special measures. A new leadership group was appointed to turn the school around, and, in 2013, the school came out of special measures. In May 2015, the school was judged by Ofsted to be a 'good' school. As of 2023, the school's most recent inspection was in 2021, with an outcome of Requires Improvement.

The local authority closed its sixth form provision due to falling numbers, after the school had spent a substantial amount of money developing a new sixth form block. The school then worked with other schools in the borough to develop a multi-school campus, on which four schools are located: Bowes Southgate Green Primary School, which opened in 2014 and takes two forms of entry; West Lea School, which provides additional resourced provision to support children with special needs in a mainstream setting; the sixth form of Winchmore School; and Broomfield School itself.

=== 2023-present: Laurel Park ===
In January 2023, the headteacher (Adele Cristofi) told MyLondon that she was planning a rebrand of the school for September 2023. She said that this is because "'This school at times in its history has had a poor reputation within the community'". The school was subsequently given its current name, Laurel Park School.

A consultation ran from December 2023 to January 2024 regarding a proposal from the school to offer post-16 vocational training leading to T level qualifications. The consultation received four responses: two from local residents, one from a governor of the school, and one from a parent of a current pupil of the school; all were in favour of the proposal. As a result the proposal was approved with no amendments being made.
