= The Human Body (TV series) =

- Also known as: Intimate Universe: The Human Body
- Genre: Science
- Directed by: Richard Dale; Emma De'Ath; Andrew Thompson; Peter Georgi; Christopher Spencer; Liesel Evans; John Groom
- Presented by: Robert Winston
- Country of origin: United Kingdom
- Original language: English
- No. of episodes: 7

Production
- Executive producer: Lorraine Heggessey
- Producer: Richard Dale
- Production companies: BBC; The Learning Channel

Original release
- Network: BBC One
- Release: 20 May – 25 June 1998

The Human Body is an eight-part documentary series, first shown on 20 May 1998 on BBC One and presented by medical scientist Robert Winston. A co-production between the BBC and The Learning Channel, the series looks at the mechanics and emotions of the human body from birth to death.

The series was nominated for numerous awards, winning several, including three BAFTA awards, four RTS awards and a Peabody Award.

== Production ==
Described as the BBC's "first major TV series on human biology", it took over two years to make and aimed to be the definitive set of programmes on the human body. The series was produced by Richard Dale and presented by Professor Robert Winston, a fertility expert.

The series used a variety of different techniques to present the topics being discussed, including endoscopes and computer graphics for internal shots, time-lapse photography to show the growth of hair and nails, magnetic resonance imaging and scanning electron microscopy.

== Episodes ==
1. "Life Story" – Every second, a world of miraculous microscopic events take place within the body. (20 May 1998)
2. "An Everyday Miracle" – The drama of conception activates the most sophisticated life support machine on earth. (27 May 1998)
3. "First Steps" – In four years, the new-born child learns every survival skill. (3 June 1998)
4. "Raging Teens" – The hormone-driven roller-coaster otherwise known as adolescence! (10 June 1998)
5. "Brain Power" – The adult human brain is the most complicated - and mysterious - object in the universe. In this episode, Winston deliberately intoxicates himself in a restaurant to show the effects alcohol has on the brain. (17 June 1998)
6. "As Time Goes By" – Ageing is far more complex - and fascinating - than mere decline. (24 June 1998)
7. "The End of Life" – Even in death, the body reveals remarkable secrets. (25 June 1998)

== Reception ==
The series gained 6.3 million viewers and an audience share of 38%.

=== Awards ===
The series was nominated for numerous awards, winning several, including three BAFTA awards, four RTS awards and a Peabody Award.

Year	Award	Result	Category / Comments
1998	British Academy Television Awards	Won	Best Factual Series (Richard Dale)
1998	British Academy Television Awards	Won	Originality (Richard Dale)
1998	British Academy Television Awards	Won	Best Graphic Design (Tim Goodchild, David Haith)
1998	British Academy Television Awards	Nominated	Best Photography (Factual) (Chris Hartley, David Barlow, Tim Shepherd, Rob Franklin)
1998	British Academy Television Awards	Nominated	Best Sound (Factual)
1998	Royal Television Society Awards	Won	Best Graphic Design – Programme Content Sequences (Tim Goodchild, David Haith)
1998	Royal Television Society Awards	Won	Best Lighting, Photogtaphy & Camera - Photography Documentary/Factual (Chris Hartley, David Barlow, Tim Shepherd, Rob Franklin)
1998	Royal Television Society Awards	Won	Best Visual Effects (Tim Goodchild, David Barlow, Tim Shepherd, Steve Bowman)
1998	Royal Television Society Awards	Won	Craft and Design Innovation
1998	Royal Television Society Awards	Nominated	Team Award
1998	National Television Awards	Nominated	Most Popular Documentary Series
1998	George Foster Peabody Awards	Won	"Never needlessly technical and always witty, energetic, and innovative, The Human Body takes us on an incredible voyage, and for so doing, is deserving of the Peabody Award."
1999	International Monitor Awards	Won	Documentaries – Director (Christopher Spencer for "The End of Life")
1999	San Francisco International Film Festival Silver Spire	Won	Television – Science and Nature (Alan Bookbinder, Lorraine Heggessey, Richard Dale, Christopher Spencer for "The End of Life")
1999	International Documentary Association Awards	Nominated	Limited Series (Sandra Gregory, Richard Dale)

== Other formats ==
A DVD of the series was released in July 2001 and includes a 50-minute feature on The Making of the Human Body - A final overview that reveals the techniques and developments that made the series possible.

The series was adapted into a film released for IMAX cinemas, with Robert Winston returning to narrate. The film won the Giant Screen Theatre Association's Best Film For Lifelong Learning award.

== Book ==
The book accompanying the series was written by Anthony Smith. According to one review, "Smith transcends anatomical trivia to record our bodies' powerful tale with empathy and clarity."
