= De Bohun Primary School =

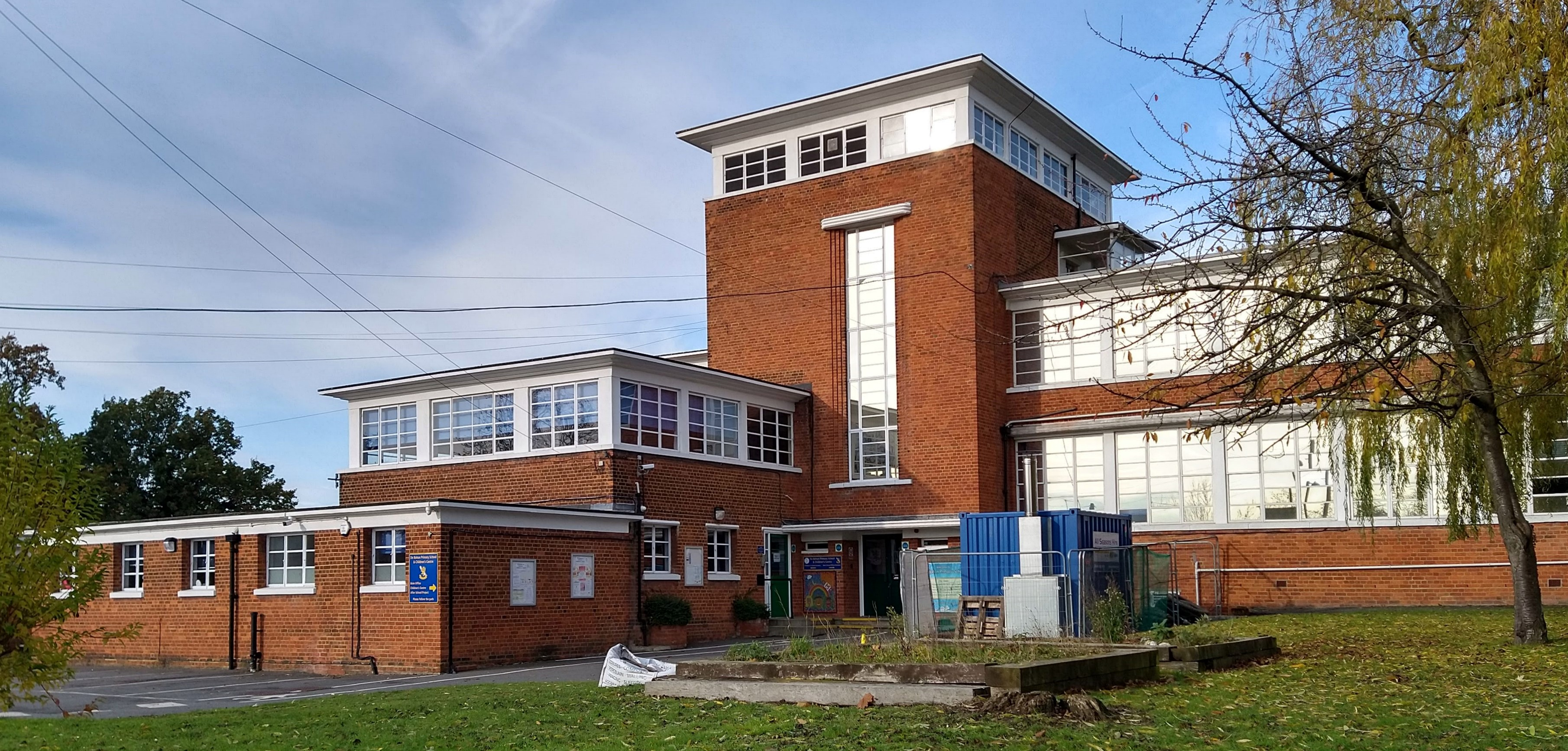

Location
- Green Road; Southgate, Greater London, N14 4AD; England; 51.6437°N 0.1410°W

Information
- Other names: De Bohun Primary School and Children's Centre; De Bohun School
- Type: Community school
- Motto: From possibility to reality...
- Established: 1936
- Local authority: Enfield London Borough Council
- Department for Education URN: 102022 Tables
- Ofsted: Reports
- Head teacher: Dominic Smart
- Gender: Mixed
- Age range: 2–11
- Enrolment: 448 (2019)
- Capacity: 420
- Accreditation: IQM Centre of Excellence
- Website: www.debohun.enfield.sch.uk

Listed Building – Grade II
- Official name: De Bohun School
- Designated: 24 March 1994
- Reference no.: 1241413

De Bohun Primary School (also known as De Bohun Primary School and Children's Centre and simply referred to as De Bohun School) is a 2–11 mixed, community primary school in Southgate, Greater London, England. It was established in 1936 and is a Grade II listed building.

== History ==
De Bohun Primary School was established in 1936 and divided into junior mixed and infants' departments a year later. Juniors occupied the first floor and infants the ground floor from 1955. The school had 324 juniors and 289 infants, including 60 nursery children in 1973. In December 2009, the school was in the bottom ten of state primary schools in London with the lowest percentage of students passing SATs in both English and maths combined, at 37%.

A book titled Outdoor Learning in the Early Years: Management and Innovation by Helen Bilton was published in 2010. It described the school's reception children as being "very clear what the expectations of the class are and they know that the staff are willing to pursue and develop their interests. Children come into the room confident and very willing to get going with their current interests".

In July 2012, the condition of the school building was described by its headteacher Terry Scott, as "looking like a war-torn building" and "not fit for a school". There were cracks in some of the walls, some of the masonry from the windows ledges had come away, windows that don't open and the roof in poor condition. It was noted as being expensive to repair due to the school being a listed building. Along with other schools in the London Borough of Enfield, the school was under pressure to increase its intake because of a boom in the birth rate and many families moving out of inner London to the suburbs, due to the benefit caps making it unaffordable. Its classroom sizes however are 45 square metres (480 square feet) which is less than the present minimum requirement of 65 square metres (700 square feet) for teaching a class of 30.

The school was placed into 'special measures' by Ofsted following its inspection in October 2012 but was rated 'good' in July 2016. In August 2013, along with a number of other primary schools in London, it was part of a £1.2 million 'Size and Lung Function in Children' or 'SLIC' study by the UCL Great Ormond Street Institute of Child Health, where its researchers visited these schools in a mobile testing laboratory and provided science workshops alongside the lung measurements. It was funded primarily by the Wellcome Trust and "provided the first clear evidence of the extent to which lung capacities differ between healthy children of different ethnicities".

It was awarded the Inclusion Quality Mark (IQM) 'Centre of Excellence' status in November 2018.

== See also ==
- Salcombe Preparatory School, whose Green Road building is adjacent and was built at the same time.
