= Bowes Primary School =

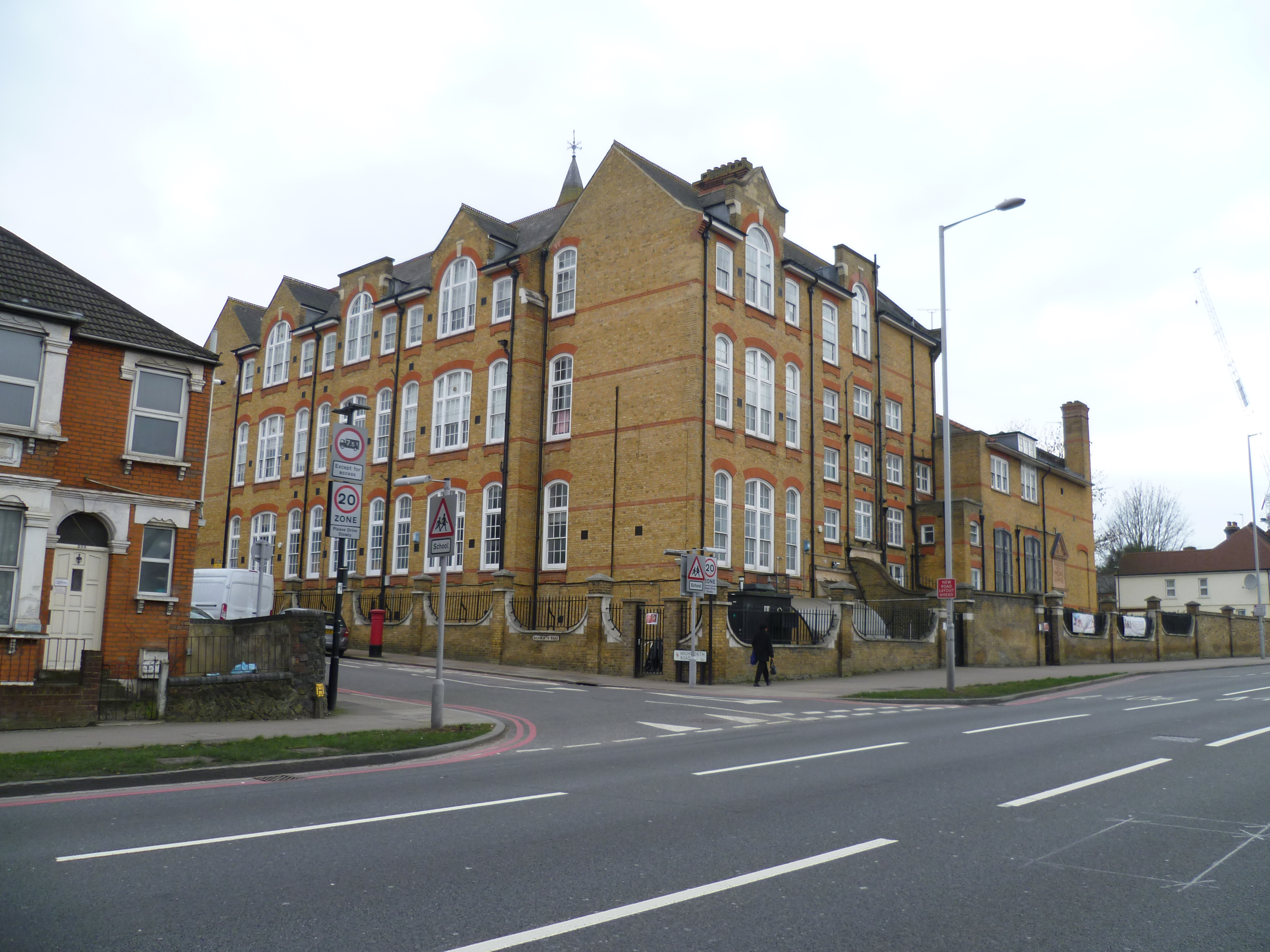

Location
- Bowes Road; New Southgate; London, N11 2HL; England; 51°36′49″N 0°07′32″W

Information
- Type: Academy
- Established: 1901
- Local authority: Enfield
- Trust: Enfield Learning Trust
- Department for Education URN: 143201 Tables
- Ofsted: Reports
- Headteacher: Effie Demetriou
- Gender: Coeducational
- Age: 3 to 11
- Enrolment: 636
- Colour: Royal blue
- Website: https://www.bowesprimaryschool.org/

Bowes Primary School is a coeducational primary school with a nursery and a reception class. It is located between Stanley Road and Highworth Road on the North Circular Road section of Bowes Road in New Southgate in the London Borough of Enfield.

== History ==
At the School Board meeting on 6 April 1900, Messrs. W. Lawrence and Son of Tottenham were successful with a tender of £18,149 to build Bowes Road School, which was planned for 10 local pupils.

A tender for electrical installation for £619 was unsuccessful, as it was £395 higher than the successful tender for installing gas fittings.

Bowes Road School for Infants opened at 9am on 2 September 1901, and separate Junior Boys and Girls Schools opened on the upper floors. In 1927, the schools were reorganised into two schools, Senior Mixed and Junior Mixed with Infants.

When the secondary pupils moved to Arnos School in 1939 the school was reorganised again into two schools, Bowes Junior Mixed School and Bowes Infant School. These two schools were reorganised into the present school in 1988. It became a grade II listed building on 7 June 1999.

Previously a community school administered by Enfield London Borough Council, in September 2016 Bowes Primary School converted to academy status. The school is now sponsored by the Enfield Learning Trust.
