= Salcombe Preparatory School =

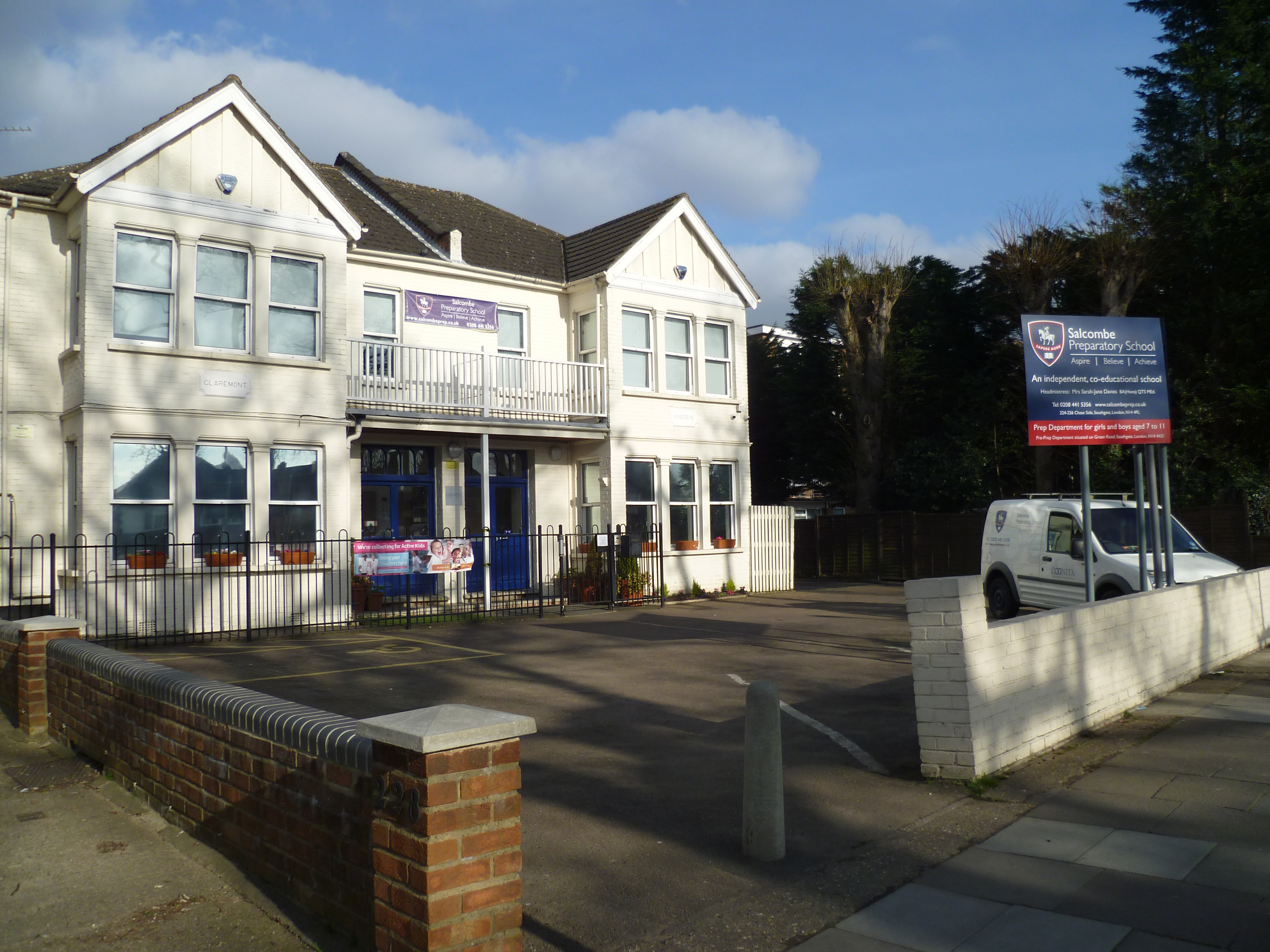
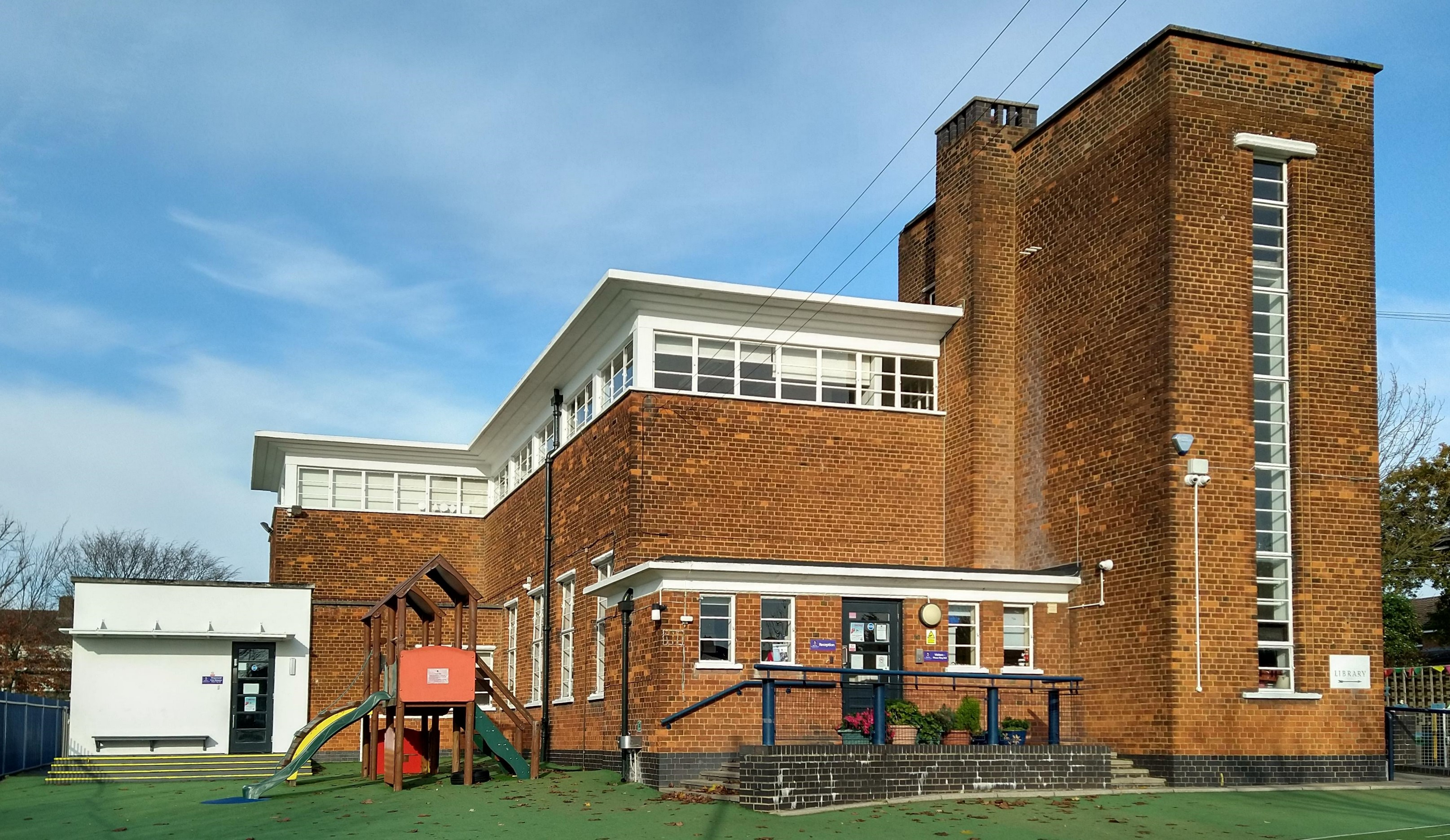
- Above: The Chase Side (top) and Green Road (bottom) sites

Location
- 224-226 Chase Side; London, N14 4PL; England
- Coordinates: 51.6379°N 0.1398°W

Information
- Type: Preparatory day school
- Motto: Sapere aude ("Dare to Know")
- Established: 1916
- Local authority: London Borough of Enfield
- Department for Education URN: 102063 Tables
- Head: Sarah-Jane Davies
- Gender: Coeducational
- Age: 3 to 11
- Enrolment: 190~
- Former pupils: Old Salcombians
- Website: http://www.salcombeprep.co.uk/

Salcombe Preparatory School is a co-educational preparatory school for approximately 200 pupils, located in Southgate, London, England. The school is currently owned and operated by Cognita. Founded in 1916, Salcombe is a co-educational preparatory day school for children aged between 3 and 11. The school is located in Chase Side, Southgate, and Green Road, Oakwood, both in North London. The Green Road site is Grade II listed with Historic England.

== History ==
Salcombe Preparatory School first opened in 1916 under the leadership of the Deakin sisters: Freda Deakin and Ethel Deakin in Hornsey. The school initially educated eight "well to do" children.

In 1917, with World War I ongoing, and the advent of Zeppelin raids, it was decided that the school could not operate in Hornsey and the Deakin sisters took the students to their country residence, Salcombe House, in Devon. In 1918, upon returning to London, the sisters relocated their school to Avenue Road in Southgate close to the current site on Chase Side.

Between 1977 and 1990, the school was run by Ms. Flood and her husband Ernest Lawn. The school was acquired by Asquith Court group in 1990 and the first headmaster was appointed - Anthony Blackhurst.

In 1998, the school needed to expand and the Green Road site was acquired for the lower years. The Green Road building is Grade II listed with Historic England.

== Heads ==
- Ethel Deakin (1916–75)
- Ernest Lawn and Ms. Flood (1977–90)
- Anthony Blackhurst (1990–2001)
- Ari Guha (2001-2005)
- Floyd Steadman (2006-2008)
- Berni Curzon (2008-2009)
- Christina Leach (2009-2013)
- Sarah-Jane Davies (2013–2021)
- Nicola Sands (2021–present)

== Notable former pupils ==
- Karren Brady, sporting executive & television broadcaster
- Sir Robert Winston, professor, medical doctor, scientist, television presenter and politician
- Maro Itoje, England international rugby player
- Ross McWhirter, co-founder of Guinness World Records
- Norris McWhirter, co-founder of Guinness World Records

== See also ==
- De Bohun Primary School in Green Road
