= Durants School =

Special school in Enfield, London, England

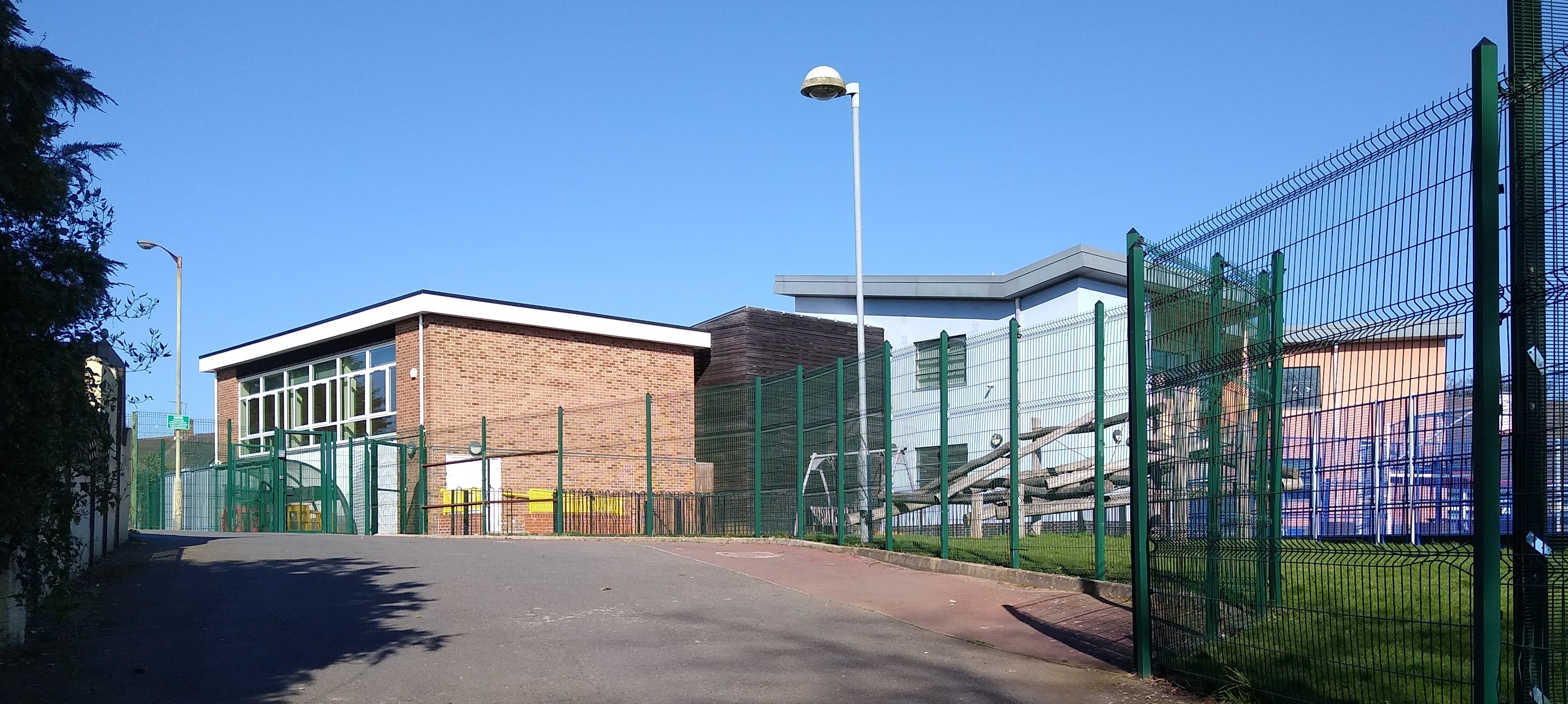

Location
- Pitfield Way; Enfield, Middlesex, EN3 5BY; England
- 51°39′50″N 0°02′46″W

Information
- Type: Special school, Community school
- Local authority: London Borough of Enfield
- Department for Education URN: 102066 Tables
- Ofsted: Reports
- Head teacher: Peter De Rosa
- Gender: Coeducational
- Age: 11 to 19
- Enrolment: 95
- Website: https://www.durants.enfield.sch.uk/

Durants School is a coeducational Special School in Enfield, London. There are 95 pupils on the roll, between the ages of 11 and 19.

As part of a global citizenship initiative, it has a link to Dworzulu School in Accra.

An emotional awareness project, which is relatively unusual for special schools, was conducted at the school in 1996.

A unit for autistic learners was opened in 2005.
