= Southend Airshow =

Airshow in Essex, UK

Southend Festival of the Air
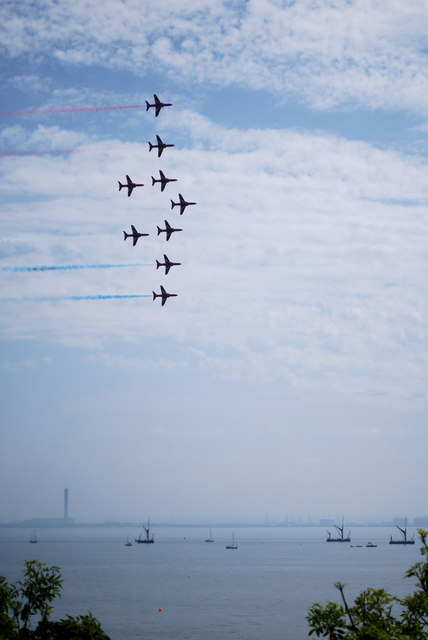
- Southend Airshow - geograph
- Status: Cancelled
- Genre: Air show
- Dates: May
- Locations: Southend-on-Sea, Essex
- Country: U.K.
- Established: 1986
- Most recent: 2012
- Organiser: Gareth Evans originally started this airshow whilst he was Director of Southend Airport

The Southend Airshow, in aviation, later officially known as the Southend Festival of the Air, was an annual airshow held in Southend-on-Sea, Essex, in the United Kingdom and was held for 27 consecutive years: it was said to be the longest running seafront airshow. The airshow usually spanned a two-day period in May each year, and was the largest free airshow in Europe.

The first Southend airshow was held on Monday 26 May 1986, as the finale of the Southend Spring Festival. 1986 was the only year that there was a fee charged to enter a cordoned-off display area, with adults charged £3 and children £1. In order to stop evasion of the entrance fee, 8 ft high scaffolding covered with nylon netting was erected. The star of the show on that day was a British Airways Concorde, which performed a double pass carrying 150 passengers whilst on its way back to Heathrow from a trip round the Bay of Biscay.

Southend has attracted many aircraft and display teams including; The Red Arrows, Frecce Tricolori, Battle of Britain Memorial Flight, RAF Falcons, the Sally B Boeing B-17 Flying Fortress, A10 Thunderbolt, Hawker Siddeley Nimrod, Avro Shackleton, Hawker Siddeley Harrier, Vulcan, F117a, Vickers Viscount, Boeing 737, 747, 757, 767, the Saab Draken and a Catalina flying boat estuary takeoff and landing, to its show.

The cancellation of the airshow was announced by Southend-on-Sea Borough Council on 14 January 2013, as part of the austerity cutbacks by Southend Council; a saving of £130,000 was expected. An unsuccessful petition was started to save the airshow.
