= National Transport Trust =

The National Transport Trust is a British registered charity founded in 1965 as the Transport Trust, the name later changed to reflect its national remit and coverage of all forms of transport heritage. The Trust acts as a hub for the UK's transport preservation movement, providing advice and assistance, organizing public events, and working to secure suitable accommodation and maintenance facilities for historic vehicles and infrastructure. Its patron is Anne, Princess Royal

== Objectives ==
The National Transport Trust is a registered charity that supports restoration campaigns and projects across all transport sectors in the United Kingdom. It provides legal and technical advice to the UK Government, individual restorers and various conservation groups and bodies, such as the Heritage Lottery Fund. It presents annual restoration awards that recognise outstanding achievements in conservation, restoration, and preservation of transport heritage. It maintains a particular focus on encouraging young people to engage with restoration work through its Young Preservationist initiative. The Trust's patron is Anne, Princess Royal.

== Pressures on heritage preservation ==
The Heritage Lottery Fund commissioned the Transport Trust to assess pressures on the transport heritage movement, the state of artefacts and their locations, to help them prioritize applications for funding support. The resulting 145-page report, "Transport Heritage: An Assessment of Needs & Potential", provides a unique snapshot of the health of the transport preservation movement in Britain. It is estimated that audiences and participants in heritage transport activities exceed 15 million people a year, making it one of Britain's most important leisure activities. Britain's particularly rich transport history has no doubt played a catalytic role in building up this level of grassroots participation.

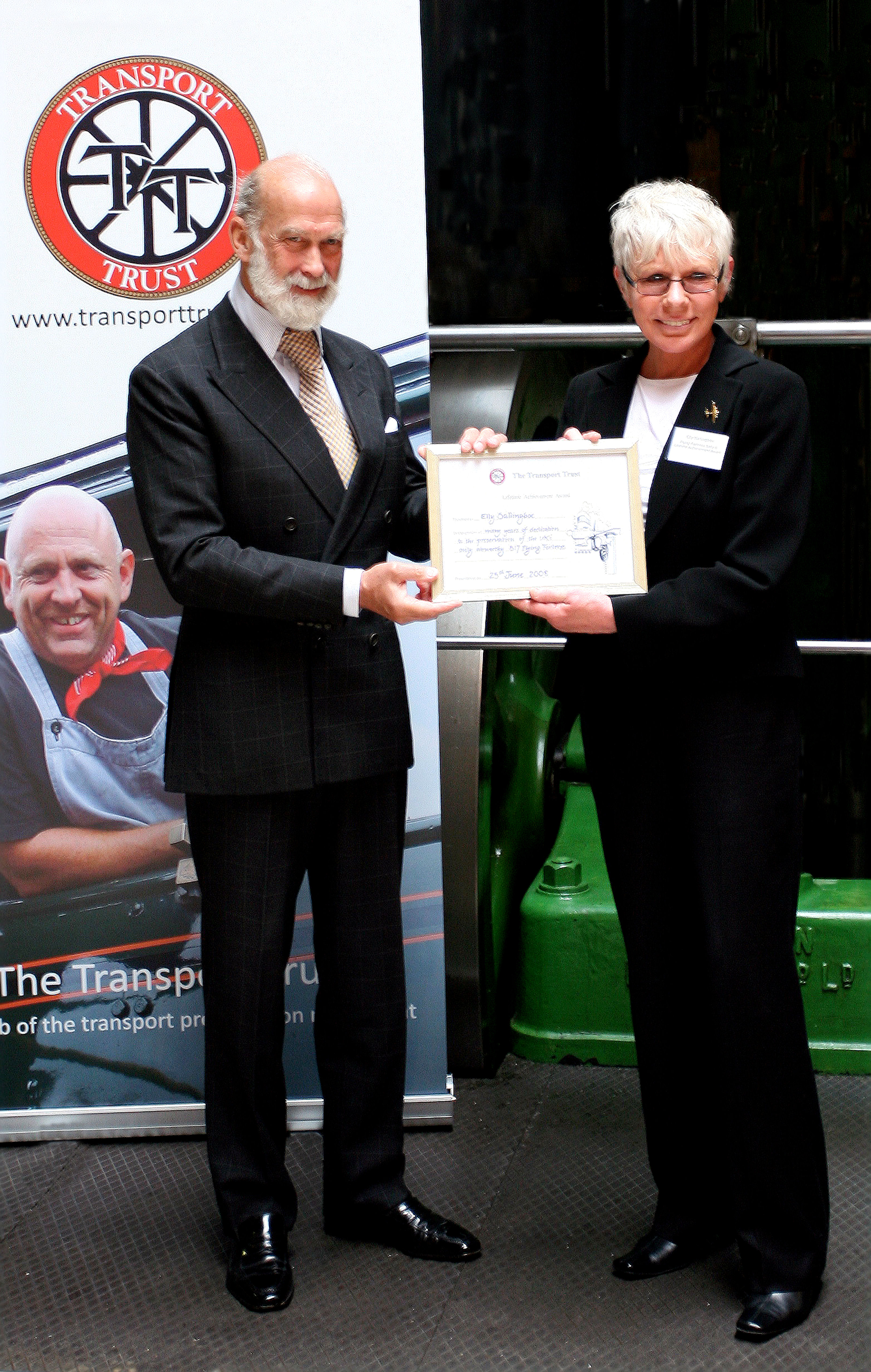
Elly Sallingboe was awarded the Transport Trust Lifetime Achievement Award in 2008 in recognition of over thirty years of dedication to the preservation and operation of Britain's only airworthy Boeing B-17 Flying Fortress – the 'Sally B' .

Surprisingly, although there are good collections of artefacts in public sector museums, it is the private sector preservationists that have made the most significant contribution to conservation and to the provision of the active enjoyment of transport to the public. A significant example is the restoration of the Avro Vulcan XH558 to flight status, among the most complex restoration projects ever undertaken globally; the project remained funded entirely by public donations, for which the Chief Executive of the Vulcan to the Sky Trust, Dr. Robert Pleming, was presented the Transport Trust Preservationist of The Year award, by Prince Michael of Kent. Dr. Pleming is now a Trustee of the National Transport Trust.

=== Aviation ===
The widespread preservation of aircraft in the UK began in the 1960s, when a large number of obsolete military aircraft became available. A push to co-ordinate the movement led to the founding of the British Aviation Preservation Council (BAPC) in 1967; however, very few private collections are represented. Although over 2,500 aircraft survive and are capable of preservation, little progress has been made to develop a clear preservation strategy, with 4% within the highest grade and as many as 26% within the second kept outside. Historically, insufficient attention has also been paid to preserving airfield architecture; however, the designation in 2007 of Duxford Aerodrome as a Conservation Area will help preserve a virtually intact site, first established as a Royal Flying Corps base in 1916 and fully operational as an RAF base until 1961. This Battle of Britain airfield, home to Douglas Bader's Big Wing experiments and the first RAF base to receive the Supermarine Spitfire, now houses the Imperial War Museum Duxford; the facility remains the largest center of European aviation history, home to the largest collection of American aircraft outside of the US.

The key needs for the aviation category are: to prioritize individual aircraft for preservation; to move middle grade airframes into hangarage; to pay greater attention to civil aircraft; and to deal with pressing gaps in conservation skills.

=== Buses and coaches ===
There are approximately 4,000 buses and coaches in preservation, of which some 45% are in a recognized collection or museum, private or public; however, among the entirety of the vehicles in preservation, less than 30% are restored. Most in museums are from the 1950s and 1960s, with only 10% from before 1940; however, over 80% of the total are owned by private individuals. With little support they have been responsible for the majority of bus conservation. Little progress has been made in prioritizing this assortment, which is scattered all over the country and concentrated within small quantities in the cities.

The key needs for the bus and coach category are: the completion of a category register of preserved buses as a prelude to introducing a grading system; a strategy for accommodating at least the most important vehicles under cover (presently 50% of all preserved buses are stored in the open); the conservation of the most important vehicles; facilities for improved public access and education; and an archive of papers, ephemera and small artefacts which might otherwise disappear.

=== Railways ===
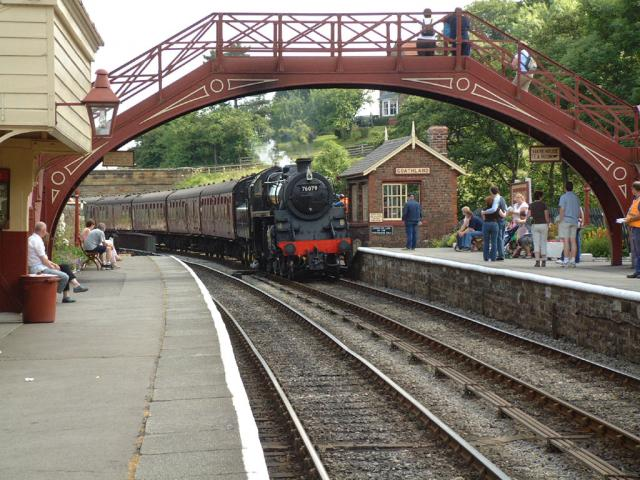
Goathland railway station on the North Yorkshire Moors Railway, showing preserved rolling stock, buildings and infrastructure.

With over 400 miles of track, nearly 600 stations and about 150 locations around the country, heritage railways and the items in museums represent a large investment. Amassing a combined annual turnover in excess of £30 million and around 9 million passengers a year, they form a prime element of the British leisure industry. Incredibly, over 1,000 steam engines survive, though less than 20% are operable at any one time, due to the high cost of overhaul. In addition, over 700 diesel locomotives and about 150 passenger units are in preservation, together with a small number of electric units. Over 3,000 passenger carriages and 2,500 freight vehicles are also held in various states of conservation. The Heritage Railway Association provides support and advice to heritage lines, with the busiest heritage line in Britain remaining the North Yorkshire Moors Railway; the Moors Railway operates over 100 days a year, over the bulk of the 24-mile trackbed constructed by George Stephenson and opened in 1836.

The key needs for the railways category are: a grading system for vehicles and lines to focus funding on the most worthy among these; safe access for the public to workshops and sheds to increase visitor appeal; covered accommodation for both restoration work and carriage storage; a concerted effort to conserve electric trains; support for private enthusiast restoration projects to increase capacity; and the storage of archives to minimize losses of priceless records.

=== Maritime ===
This diverse and scattered category is highly dependent on private individuals. Only canal and inland waterways craft have a degree of structure, largely because of their links with the waterways. Others such as fishing boats, lifeboats and traditional river craft, are found all round the UK; most boats are privately owned and the majority are sailable. In museums, smaller vessels are typically overshadowed by larger ones, with steam possessing a strong following. There are an estimated number of approximately 500 small boats of major historical importance which remain designated for preservation; their interests are managed by a plethora of umbrella organizations, to which the National Maritime Museum is attempting to bring a degree of co-ordination. The National Small Boat Register, managed by the National Maritime Museum Cornwall, maintains listings of over 1,200 small craft (under 12m/40 ft.) that embrace rarity, historic and cultural value; Advisory Committee for National Historic Ships maintains a register of larger historic vessels [over 10.1m/33 ft.] that have demonstrably strong UK associations.

The key needs for the maritime category are: a common grading system across the category. in order to prioritize conservation efforts; the enhancement of the preservation of the 500 small craft of significant heritage importance, primarily via relatively modest supporting sums; more training in traditional skills; and safe storage, where boats at risk could be placed pending restoration.

=== General conclusions ===
Despite the rich diversity of Britain's transport heritage, there are many common threads. Strategic leadership and vision is vital, and umbrella organizations can play a vital role. Undercover storage is also critical for artefacts that have long exceeded their envisaged working lives. And, finally, since transport is appreciated most when used, many irreplaceable historical relics are wearing out and should be replaced by working replicas.

== Red Wheel programme ==
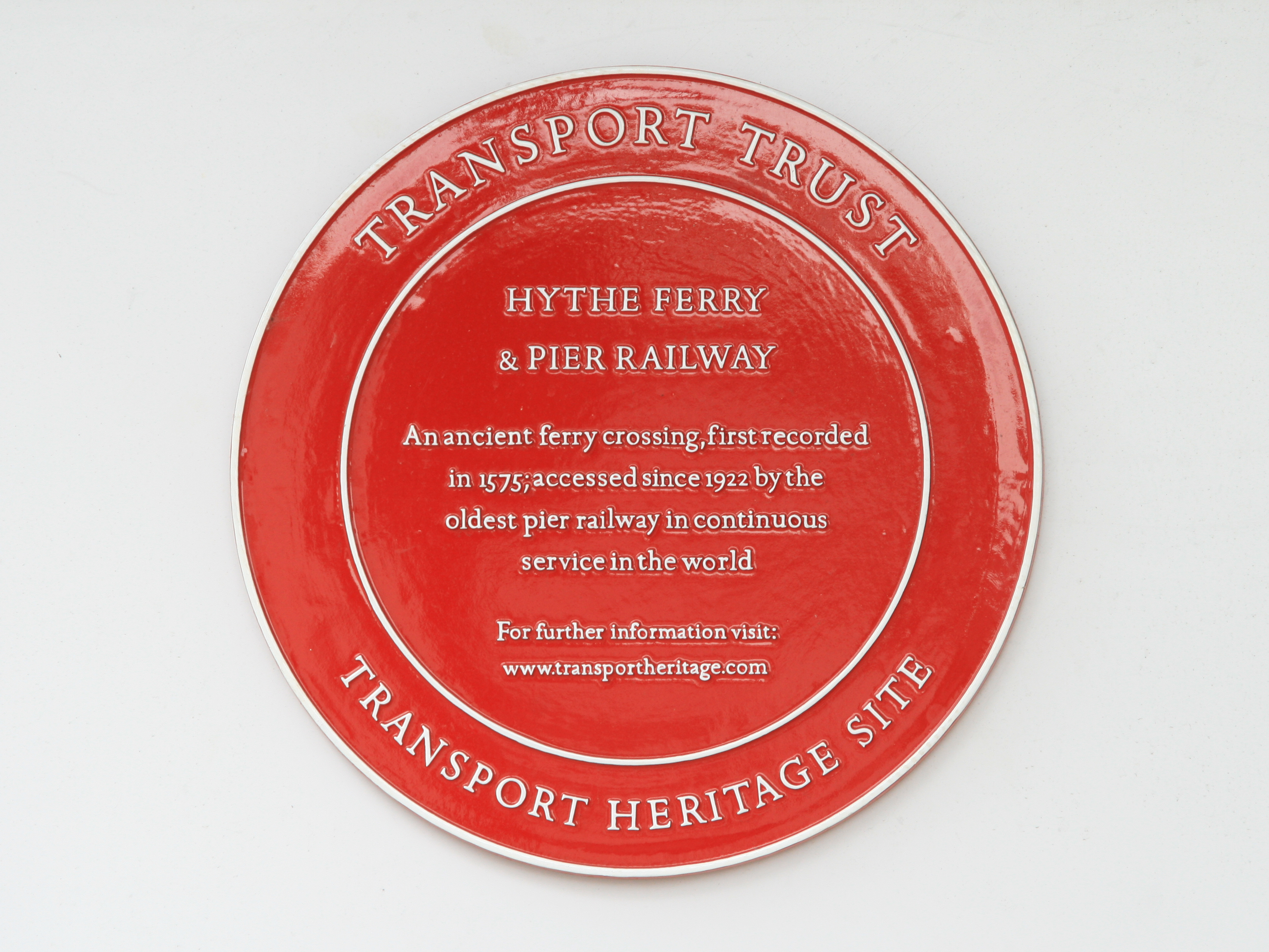
Transport Heritage plaque at Hythe Pier and Railway, the oldest working pier railway in the world.

The Trust runs a scheme that creates and places Red Wheel transport heritage plaques; these are generally assigned especially important and unusual sites of transport heritage. Over 115 Red Wheel Heritage Site plaques have been unveiled; the Trust is open to nominations for Red Wheel plaques at sites which would otherwise be ignored or their value underappreciated by members of the public.
