= James May's Big Ideas =

- Starring: James May
- Narrated by: James May
- Country of origin: United Kingdom
- Original language: English
- No. of episodes: 3

Production
- Producer: Nigel Paterson
- Running time: 60 mins

Original release
- Network: BBC Two
- Release: 28 September – 12 October 2008

Related
- James May's 20th Century

James May's Big Ideas is a three-part 2008 British television miniseries in which presenter James May of Top Gear fame travels the globe in search of implementations for concepts widely considered science fiction, or his big ideas. The series was produced by the Open University and aired on BBC Two.

The first episode documents his search for the ultimate form of personal transport, ranging from jetpacks to flying cars. In the second episode, May looks at bionics and robotics and if robots can exceed the boundaries of their programming. The third episode focuses on energy.

== Episode list ==
| No. | Title | Original release date |
|---|---|---|
| 1 | "Come Fly with Me" | 28 September 2008 |
James May travels the globe in search of his ultimate flying machine. Vehicles tested include an ekranoplan, a Jetpack, a car that can be transformed into a plane and many others.
| 2 | "Man-Machine" | 5 October 2008 |
James May discovers if his childhood dream of a world of robots will ever become true. Episode featured ASIMO.
| 3 | "Power to the People" | 12 October 2008 |
In the last of his Big Ideas journeys, James May sets off to find smarter, brighter and bolder ways of powering the planet for future generations. Episode featured sections on solar cars, solar power tower, ENV, wind turbine, Pelamis Wave Energy Converter (referred to as the snake), energy from wave power (see Stephen Salter), electricity generated from the tides and the latest development on nuclear fusion.

== See also ==
- James May's 20th Century – series broadcast on the BBC with a similar format involving inventions.
