= Imperial War Museum Duxford =

Aviation museum in Cambridgeshire, England

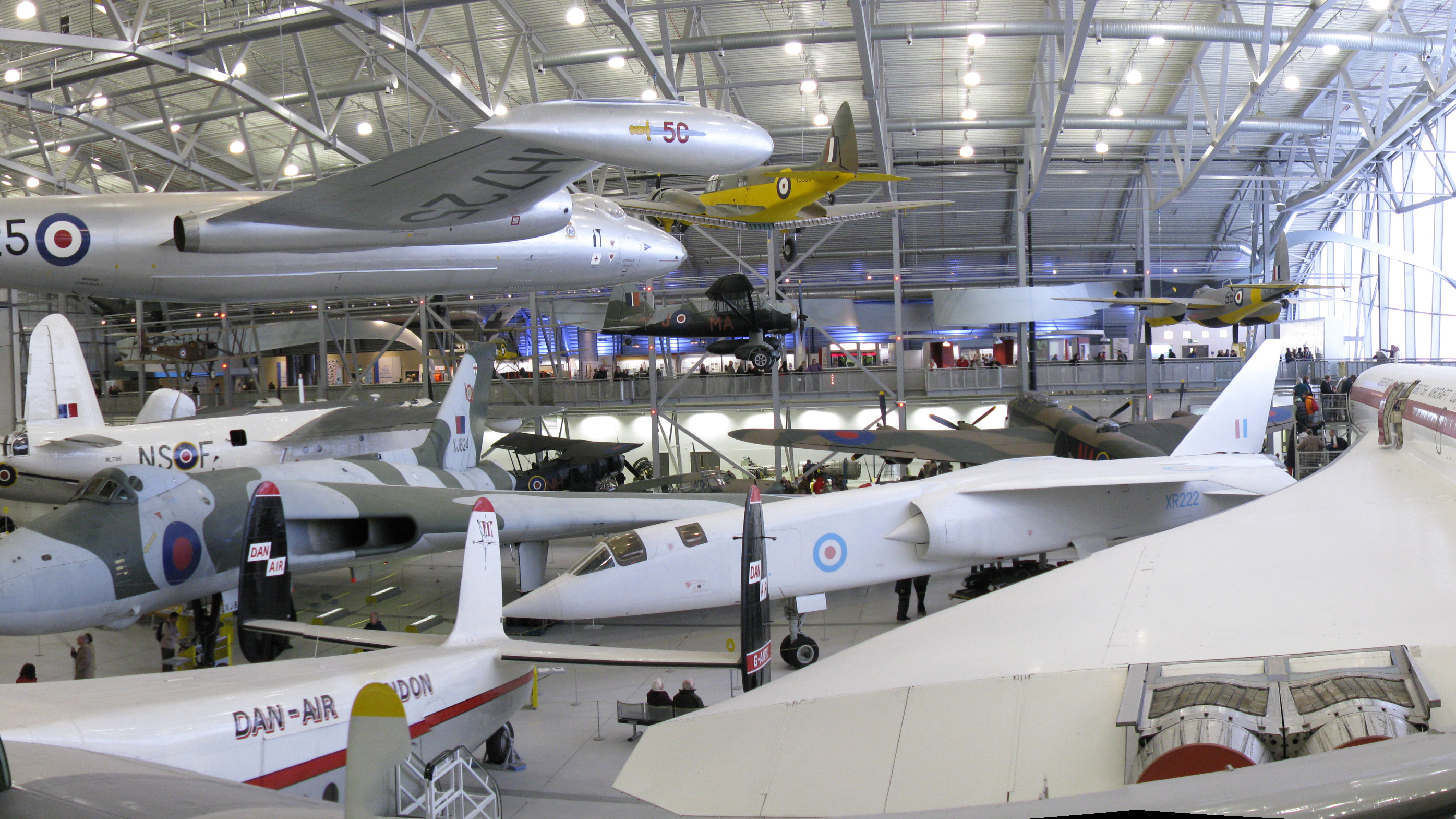
- The AirSpace exhibition hall at Imperial War Museum Duxford (October 2009)

- Location within Cambridgeshire
- Established: 1977
- Location: Imperial War Museum Duxford; Cambridgeshire; CB22 4QR; United Kingdom
- Coordinates: 52°05′35″N 0°07′46″E
- Type: Aviation museum
- Visitors: 401,287 (2019)
- Public transit access: Whittlesford Parkway
- Website: www.iwm.org.uk/visits/iwm-duxford

Imperial War Museums
- Churchill War Rooms; HMS Belfast; IWM Duxford; IWM London; IWM North

Imperial War Museum Duxford, also known as IWM Duxford or simply Duxford, is a branch of the Imperial War Museum near Duxford in Cambridgeshire, England. Duxford, Britain's largest aviation museum, houses exhibits, including nearly 200 aircraft, military vehicles, artillery and small naval vessels in seven main exhibition buildings. The site also provides storage space for the museum's other collections of material such as film, photographs, documents, books and artefacts. The site accommodates several British Army regimental museums, including those of the Parachute Regiment (named Airborne Assault) and the Royal Anglian Regiment.

Based on the historic Duxford Aerodrome, the site was originally operated by the Royal Flying Corps in the First World War. During the Second World War, Duxford played a prominent role during the Battle of Britain and was used by United States Army Air Forces fighter units in support of the daylight bombing of Germany. Duxford remained an active RAF airfield until 1961. After the Ministry of Defence declared the site surplus to requirements in 1969, the Imperial War Museum received permission to use part of the site for storage. The entirety of the site was transferred to the museum in February 1976.

In keeping with the site's history, many of Duxford's original buildings, such as hangars used during the Battle of Britain, are still in use. Many of these buildings are of particular architectural or historic significance and over thirty have listed building status, with Duxford reflecting two periods of development in both WW1 and the 1930s. The site also features several purpose-built exhibition buildings, such as the Stirling Prize-winning American Air Museum, designed by Sir Norman Foster. The site remains an active airfield and is used by civilian flying companies, and hosts regular air shows. The site is operated in partnership with Cambridgeshire County Council and the Duxford Aviation Society, a charity formed in 1975 to preserve civil aircraft and promote appreciation of British civil aviation history.

== History ==
The Imperial War Museum originated during the First World War in 1917 as the National War Museum committee, formed by the British government to record the war effort and sacrifice of Britain and her Empire. The museum opened in 1920, by which point it had been renamed the Imperial War Museum. With the outbreak of the Second World War, the museum's terms of reference were enlarged to include that conflict as well. The museum's terms of reference was broadened again in 1953 to include all modern conflicts in which British or Commonwealth forces were engaged. The effect of these expansions of remit was to cause the museum's collections to expand enormously, to the point that many parts of the collection, especially those of aircraft, vehicles and artillery, could not be effectively stored or exhibited. Although the museum's south London home (a nineteenth-century building in Southwark which was previously the Bethlem Royal Hospital) had been extended in 1966, by the end of the decade the museum was seeking additional space.

RAF Duxford, a Royal Air Force fighter station had been declared surplus to requirements by the Ministry of Defence in 1969, and the museum duly requested permission to use part of one of the airfield's hangars as temporary storage. Duxford featured three double bay hangars of First World War vintage, which together provided over 9,000 square metres (97,000 sq ft) of space. Within two years, ten of the museum's aircraft had been brought to Duxford, and were being restored by volunteers of the East Anglia Aviation Society. While the museum's own aircraft were not restored to flying condition, by cooperating with private groups the museum was able to mount its first airshow in 1973. Further air shows followed, with a display in June 1976 attracting an audience of 45,000 people. The runway was bought by Cambridgeshire County Council in 1977. The success of these shows provided a valuable source of revenue, and complemented the efforts of volunteers, so that the museum applied for the permanent transfer of the entire site to its use. Permission was received in February 1976 and Duxford became the first outstation of the Imperial War Museum. Initially open from March–October, Duxford received 167,000 visitors in the 1977 season, and 340,000 in 1978. Two million visitors had been received by 1982 and Duxford welcomed its ten millionth visitor in August 2005.

In 2021, it was reported that the museum was considering loaning 50 land vehicles to the Pima Air & Space Museum. The same year, approval for the construction of a nearby hotel was given by the local district council. In 2024, it announced that the Land Warfare Hall would be permanently closing. At the same time, a plan to collaborate with Gonville & Caius College on a combination advanced air mobility development centre and collections storage facility. The museum began a major renovation of the AirSpace hangar in 2025. More than 100 aircraft are to be relocated as part of a plan to convert the space to a dedicated Cold War exhibition.

=== Duxford aerodrome ===
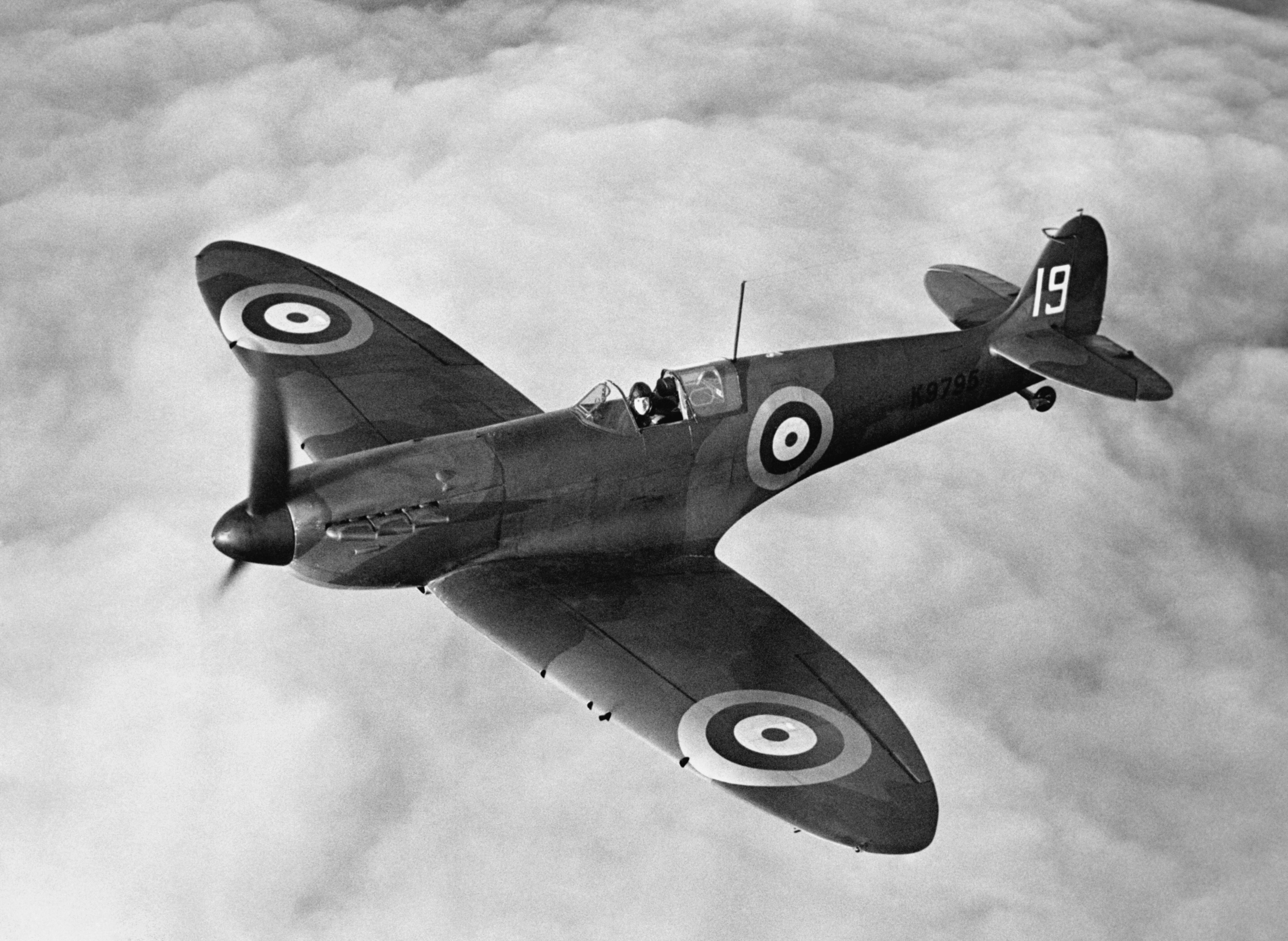
K9795, a Spitfire Mk I operated from Duxford by No. 19 Squadron in 1938.

Duxford has been associated with British military aviation since 1917, when a site near the village of Duxford, in southern Cambridgeshire, was selected for a new Royal Flying Corps training aerodrome. From 1925 Duxford became a fighter airfield, a role it was to retain until the end of its operational life, and in August 1938 the Duxford-based No.19 Squadron RAF became the first to operate the Supermarine Spitfire. With the outbreak of war in September 1939 Duxford was home to three RAF squadrons engaged on coastal patrol duties. From July 1940, Duxford saw considerable action during the Battle of Britain as a sector station of RAF Fighter Command's No. 12 Group. In the middle years of the war Duxford was home to specialist units, such as the tacticians and engineers of the Air Fighting Development Unit. In April 1942 the first Typhoon Wing was formed at Duxford. Notable among the pilots of the Wing was Group Captain John Grandy who would later rise to be Chief of the Air Staff and also served as Chairman of the Trustees of the Imperial War Museum from 1978 to 1989.

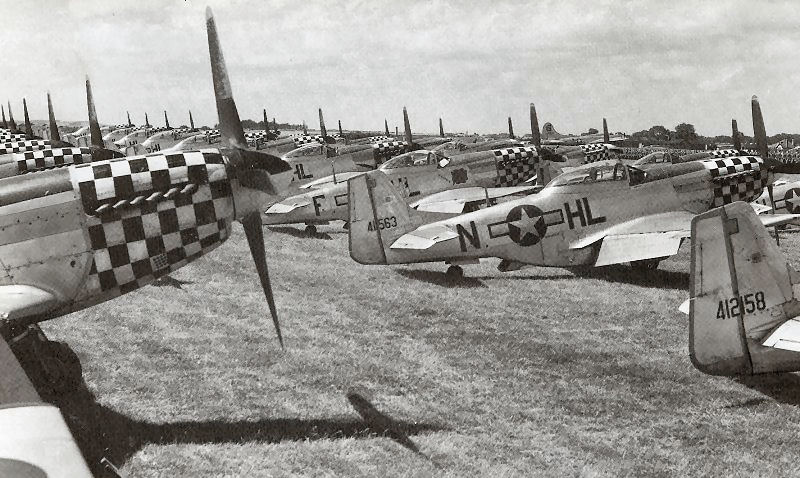
78th Fighter Group P-51D Mustangs at Duxford in summer 1945.

In March 1943 the United States Army Air Forces' 78th Fighter Group started to arrive at Duxford with their Republic P-47 Thunderbolts. The Group reequipped with North American P-51 Mustangs in December 1944 and until the end of the war in Europe the Group remained at Duxford carrying out bomber escort and fighter sweeps, ground strafing and ground attack missions. Duxford was officially returned to the RAF on 1 December 1945. It remained a fighter station but by 1958 changing defence priorities saw the RAF's fighter force move to more northerly bases. Duxford's last operational flight was made in July 1961. No longer operational, the site gradually became increasingly derelict and overgrown. In 1968 the American film studio United Artists obtained permission to use the site for the filming of Battle of Britain. During the shoot a single bay hangar, which had been built during the First World War, was demolished to simulate an air raid. After the Ministry of Defence announced its intention to dispose of Duxford plans were drawn up for various developments including two Young Offenders Institutes but were not implemented.

== Duxford Aviation Society ==
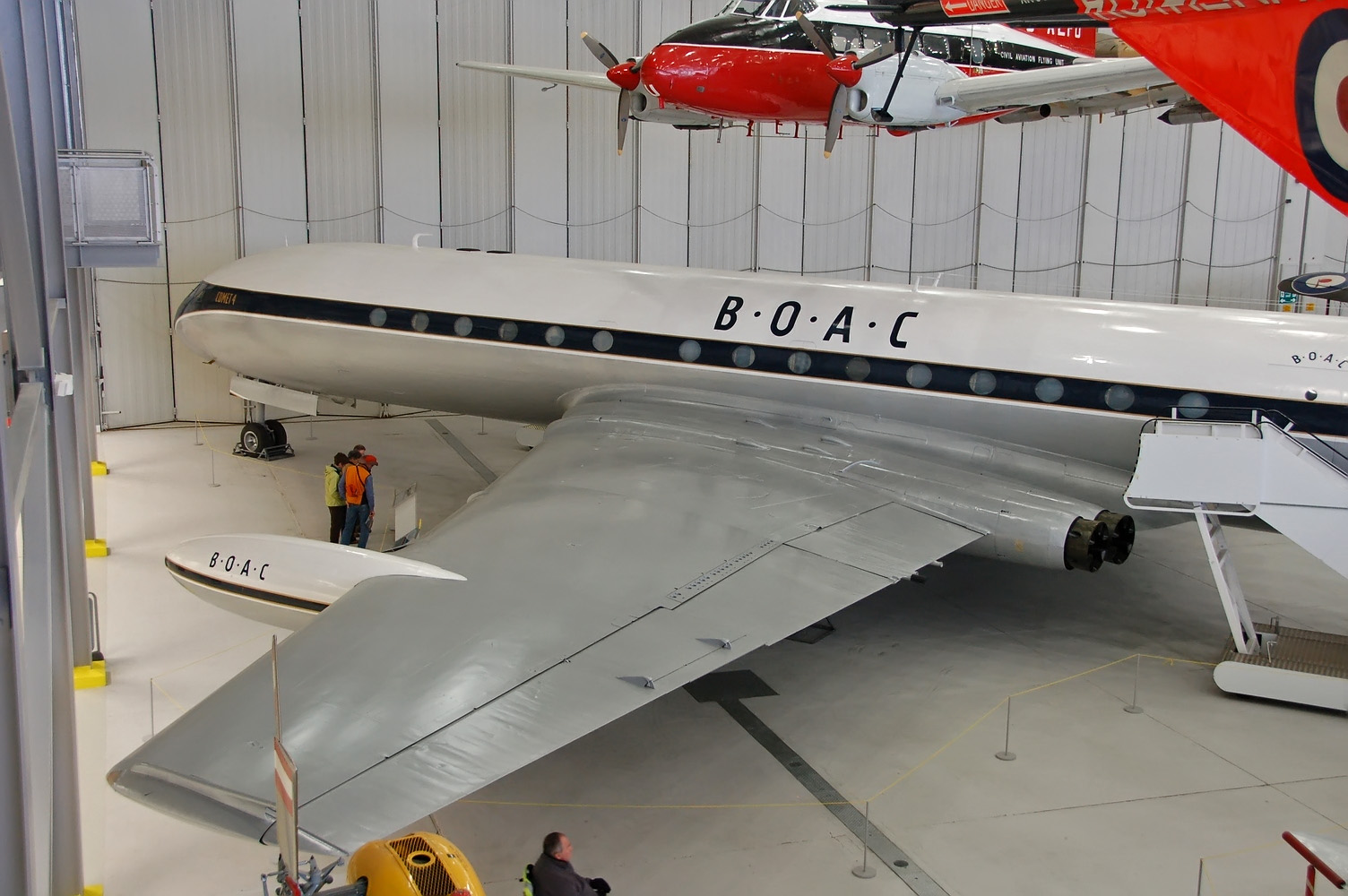
The Duxford Aviation Society Comet 4 on display in AirSpace.

Duxford is operated in partnership between the Imperial War Museum, Cambridgeshire County Council and the Duxford Aviation Society. The Society is a registered charity (No. 285809) and states two objectives; to educate the public by collecting and exhibiting historic aircraft, military vehicles and boats, and to support the Imperial War Museum.

The Society was formed in 1975 from a divergence of members of the East Anglian Aviation Society, which formerly operated the now-closed Bassingbourn Tower Museum at the former RAF Bassingbourn.

Duxford Aviation Society preserves and maintains the Civil Aviation Collection. Especially notable aircraft in the collection include a de Havilland Comet which made the first eastbound jet-powered trans-Atlantic passenger flight on 4 October 1958, and Concorde G-AXDN 101, a pre-production aircraft which achieved the highest speed of any Concorde, making a westwards trans-Atlantic flight in two hours, 56 minutes.

In support of the Museum's goals, the DAS Military Vehicle Wing provides one of the world's leading teams of military vehicle restoration engineers The Wing (or its volunteers) own some of the vehicles located at Duxford, and provide restoration services for vehicles within the museum's collection. The team also operate vehicles for demonstrations during the year. The wing's works have been featured in the Discovery Channel's Tank Overhaul programme, James May's 20th Century, and wide variety of magazines and other media.

Other elements of the society provide or support a range of functions at the Duxford site, including canteen, aircraft conservation, learning and interpretative activities and administrative tasks. An affiliated group, the Duxford Radio Society, collects, preserves, exhibits, and demonstrates historic military electronic equipment. This is housed in Buildings 177 and 178, close to the Gibraltar Gun.

Since January 1999, the Society have operated the Friends of Duxford membership scheme with the Museum.

As of 2008, the Duxford Aviation Society had almost 700 volunteer members.

== Air shows and flying ==
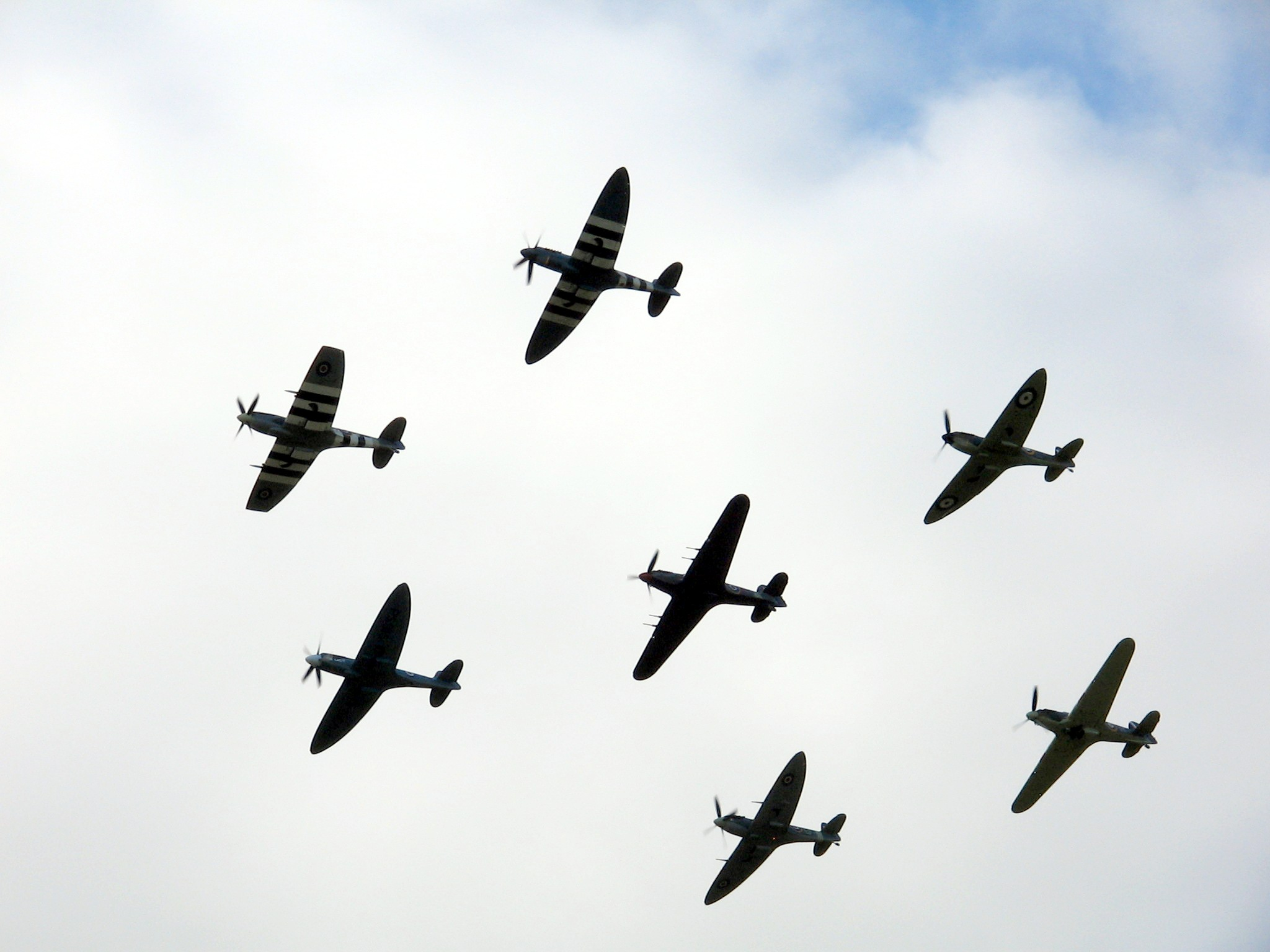
Hurricanes and Spitfires of the Battle of Britain Memorial Flight at the Duxford Air Show, May 2007.

Duxford remains an active airfield (IATA: QFO, ICAO: EGSU) and maintains two parallel runways; an unpaved 880 m (2,890 ft) grass strip, and a concrete runway with a length of 1,503 m (4,931 ft), both oriented at 060/240-degrees. The runway was originally purchased from the Ministry of Defence by the Cambridgeshire County Council in 1977. In October 2008, an agreement was reached between the council and the Imperial War Museum, under which the runways and 146 acres (0.59 km^{2}; 0.228 sq mi) of surrounding grassland would be sold to the museum for approximately £1.6 million.

Since 1973, Duxford has held regular air shows. Duxford is the home of several private aviation companies, such as Classic Wings, The Fighter Collection, the Old Flying Machine Company and The Aircraft Restoration Company. Between them these companies provide pleasure flights, historic aircraft for film or television work, and aircraft restoration services. Perhaps the most notable privately owned and operated aircraft based at Duxford is B-17 Preservation Ltd's Sally B, the only airworthy B-17 Flying Fortress in Europe.

Major air shows held regularly include the Duxford Air Show, and American Air Day, which is held in conjunction with units of the Third Air Force (part of the United States Air Forces in Europe), based at nearby RAF Lakenheath and RAF Mildenhall. The Flying Legends show (organised by The Fighter Collection), was held annually at Duxford until 2019.

The Duxford Air Show usually exhibits a wide range of aircraft, from vintage warbirds to contemporary jet aircraft, along with aerobatic flying by groups such as the Red Arrows. while the Flying Legends show focuses on historic aircraft, especially those of the Second World War. In 2008 it was reported that these displays generate up to £1.8 million, while the loss of up to £100,000 due to adverse weather is also budgeted for. The policing bill, necessary to manage the resulting road traffic, was reported as some £8,000. Major events have included the Battle of Britain 70th Anniversary airshow, held on 4–5 September 2010, attended by more than 40,000 people, featuring formation displays by four Hawker Hurricanes and sixteen Spitfires.

As an active civil airfield, operations at Duxford are regulated by the Civil Aviation Authority (CAA). In 2002 a privately operated Aero L-39 Albatros suffered a braking failure on landing, overran the runway and came to rest on the M11 motorway, a student pilot being killed after ejecting at ground level. An Air Accidents Investigation Branch inquiry recommended a review of arrangements for aircraft taking off or landing towards the M11. As a result, the CAA and Duxford agreed to a reduction in the runway's 1,500 m (4,900 ft) declared length, from 1,350 m (4,430 ft) to 1,200 m (3,900 ft), in order to provide a greater margin of error.

As a licensed airfield Duxford has its own Fire Service (currently five vehicles, and 16 fire fighters / officers) which operates as part of the Airfield & Security department, the fire service was originally operated by voluntary crews who were part of Duxford Aviation Society, with the training officers coming from Stansted and other local airports, for the last few years it has been a mixed voluntary/full-time operation.

== Site layout ==
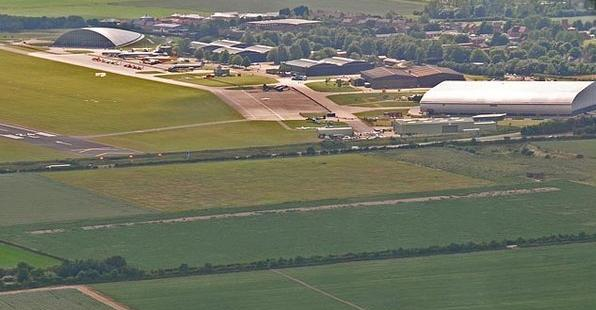
An aerial view of the IWM Duxford site in June 2008. Visible on the right is the large AirSpace exhibition hall, Hangars 2, 3, 4 and 5, the American Air Museum and the eastern end of the runway.

When originally planned in 1917, Duxford aerodrome was to occupy a 238-acre (0.96 km^{2}; 0.372 sq mi) site divided by what is now the A505 road which runs north-east from Royston to Newmarket. The area north of the road would be occupied by accommodation and administrative buildings with the airfield, hangars and technical buildings on the south side. Still divided by the A505, the museum's site is now bounded to the east by the M11 motorway, which meets the A505 adjacent to the museum site at Junction 10. The construction of the M11 in 1977 (the year the museum opened) forced the shortening of the runway by 300 metres (980 ft). In its role as a museum, the north side of the site is occupied by the Imperial War Museum's stored collections and is not generally open to the public, while the south side is occupied by various hangars and other historic buildings, purpose-built structures, and by two runways.

The south side visitor entrance, which now houses a shop and visitor facilities, was previously the airfield's armoury. The various buildings are arranged roughly parallel to the A505; AirSpace is furthest east, with Hangars 2, 3, 4 and 5 running westwards, followed by the American Air Museum. The museum site is approximately 1,800 m (5,900 ft) from one end to the other, and a visitor bus operates during opening hours.

Some aircraft and other exhibits are displayed externally, such as a Comet tank and replica Hawker Hurricane as gate guardians at the main entrance. Several commercial airliners belonging to the Duxford Aviation Society stand on the runway apron opposite the hangars. A British Aerospace 146 airliner, used by the RAF's Queen's Flight, stands on the site of the demolished hangar. A United States Air Force F-15 Eagle previously stood near the American Air Museum (now hanging inside). A Royal Engineers' Centurion AVRE stands outside the Land Warfare Hall and the Gibraltar Gun, a 9.2-inch artillery piece previously emplaced on the Rock of Gibraltar is nearby.

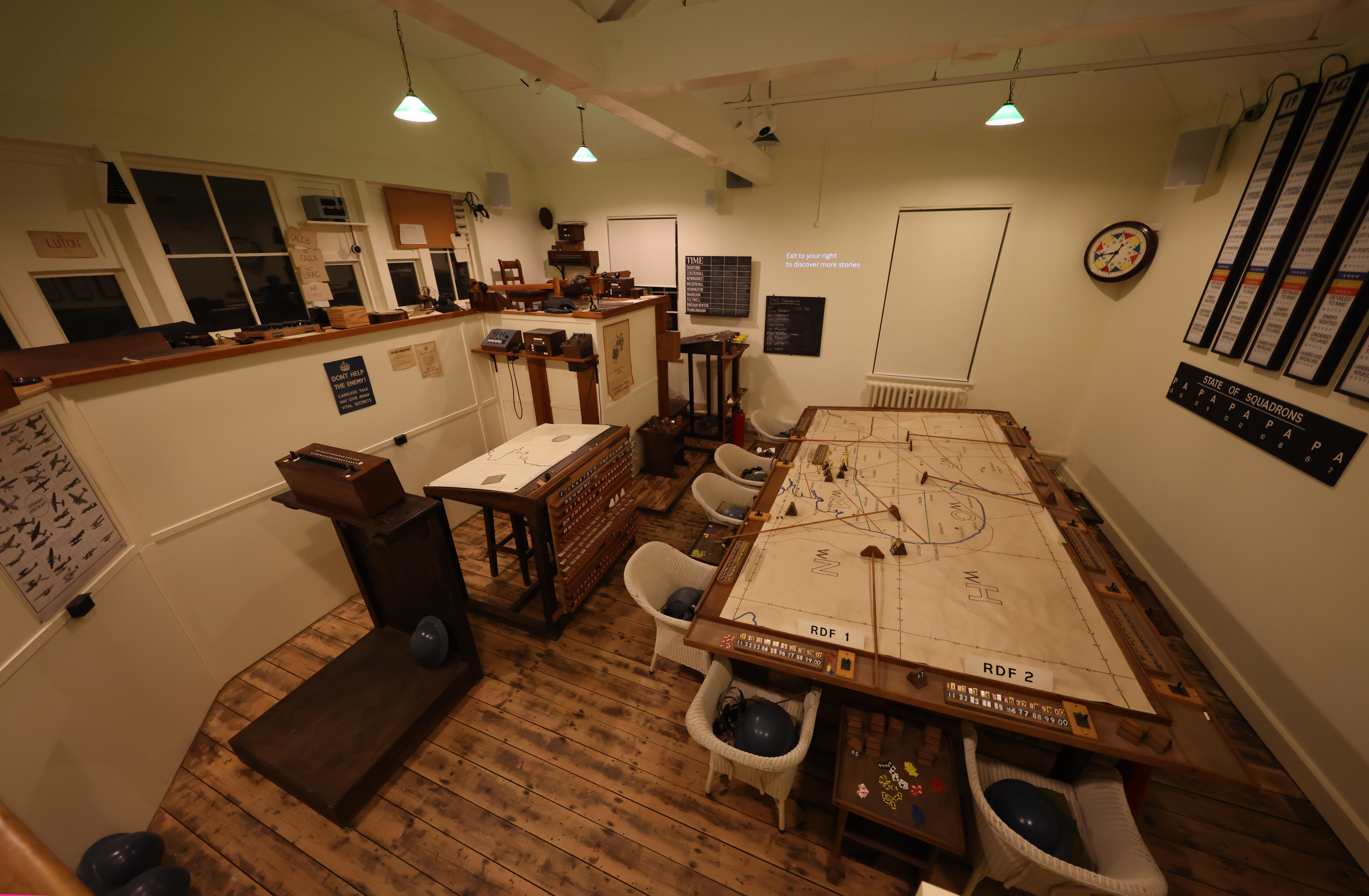
A view of Duxford's original Operations Room.

As a historic site, many of Duxford's buildings are of particular architectural or historic significance. In 2005, following a review of sites relating to British aviation history by English Heritage, some 255 buildings at 31 sites received listed building status. Duxford contains over thirty of these buildings, the largest number at any one site. Listed buildings include three hangars dating back to the First World War and the operations block, which received Grade II* status. This block, open to the public, houses the wartime operations room from which Duxford's aircraft were directed. Another historic building, the 1918 Watch Office, has been converted to accommodate the Historic Duxford exhibition, depicting the history of the site and the experiences of Duxford's personnel.

== AirSpace ==
In 2000, Duxford announced plans for the redevelopment of Hangar 1, previously known as the 'Superhangar', which was built in the 1980s. The plans would expand the building by 40%, providing more display and conservation space, improve internal conditions, and enable the museum's British and Commonwealth aircraft collection to be brought under cover. Planning permission was received later that year. The project cost £25 million and was supported by the Heritage Lottery Fund, the East of England Development Agency and BAE Systems, which contributed £6 million. The building, which provides 12,000 square metres (130,000 sq ft) of floor space, consists of an aircraft conservation area, a large exhibition hall, and a mezzanine providing views of the aircraft and interactive educational installations exploring aeronautical engineering and the principles of flight.

AirSpace officially opened to the public on 12 July 2007. Over 30 aircraft are on display, dating back to the First World War; early aircraft include rare examples of an Airco DH.9 and a Royal Aircraft Factory R.E.8. The former is one of only six surviving DH9s and the only example on display in the UK, and the latter is the only complete and original R.E.8 in existence. More recent notable aircraft include a Hawker Siddeley Harrier which served during the Falklands War with No. 1 Squadron RAF, and a Panavia Tornado, which flew the highest number of bomber sorties of any Tornado in the 1991 Gulf War. Also on display is a British Aircraft Corporation TSR-2 strike aircraft, one of only two survivors from the cancellation of the project in 1965. Recent additions include Eurofighter Typhoon DA4, one of seven Typhoon development aircraft, which was donated to the museum by the Ministry of Defence in 2008 and went on display in June 2009. Civil aircraft include the Duxford Aviation Society's Concorde and Comet described above.

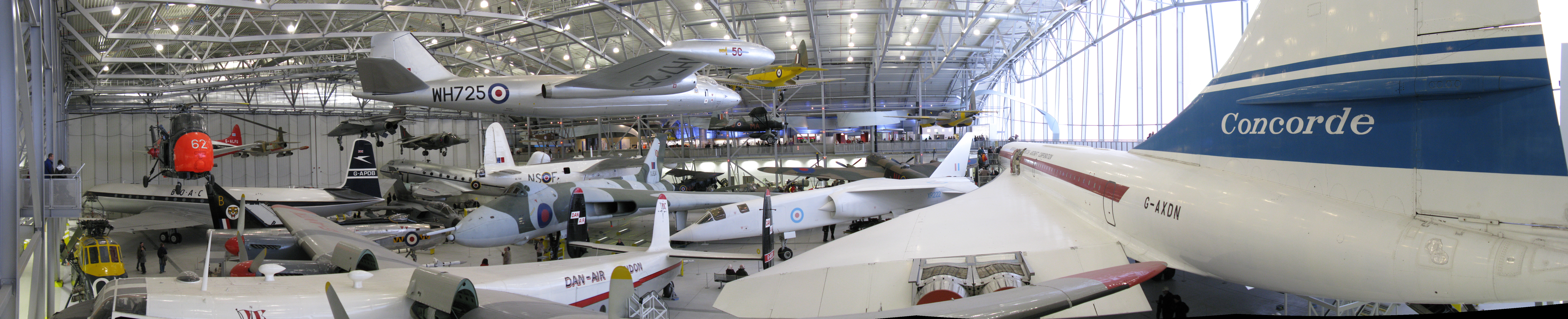
Panorama of the AirSpace exhibition hall, with the Duxford Aviation Society Concorde right foreground.

=== Airborne Assault ===
AirSpace also houses Airborne Assault, the museum of the British Army's Parachute Regiment and airborne forces. Previously located at Browning Barracks near Aldershot, the museum opened at Duxford on 8 December 2008. The opening ceremony was led by the then Prince Charles, the Parachute Regiment's Colonel-in-Chief. The museum chronicles the history of British airborne forces from the Second World War to operations in Afghanistan and cost £3 million.

== Hangar 2: Flying Aircraft ==
Hangar 2 is a double Type T2 hangar, erected in the 1970s. It occupies the site of a T2 hangar erected in the 1950s. It accommodates the flyable aircraft of Duxford's private aviation companies, such as The Fighter Collection, and allows visitors to see aircraft undergoing maintenance or restoration.

== Hangar 3: Air and Sea ==
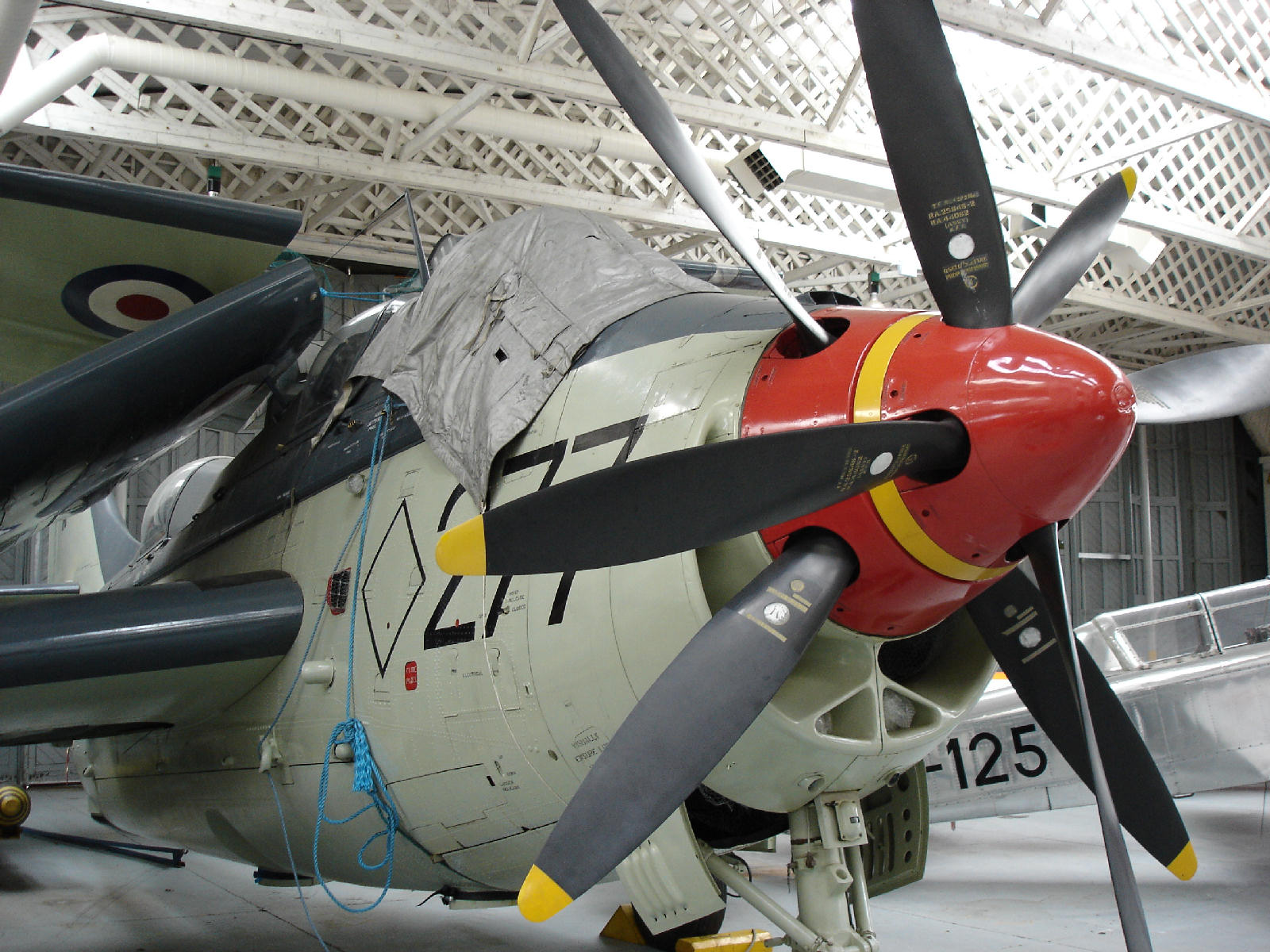
Fairey Gannet AS6, with the hangar's Belfast truss construction visible above.

Hangar 3, an original Belfast truss hangar, houses Duxford's maritime exhibition. The collection includes notable vessels and naval aircraft. Boats on display include Coastal Motor Boat 4, built by Thornycroft in 1916. She saw action during the Baltic campaign of 1918–19, and her commander Lieutenant Augustus Agar won the Victoria Cross for sinking the Russian cruiser Oleg on 17 June 1919. Other vessels include the Vosper motor torpedo boat MTB-71, acquired from the British Military Powerboat Trust in 2005, an example of an X-Craft midget submarine, and a wartime Royal National Lifeboat Institution boat, the Jesse Lumb which was stationed at Bembridge on the Isle of Wight. A variety of naval aircraft are on display, including a de Havilland Sea Vixen, Sea Venom, and Sea Vampire, and a Westland Wasp helicopter which was embarked on the frigate HMS Apollo during the Falklands War.

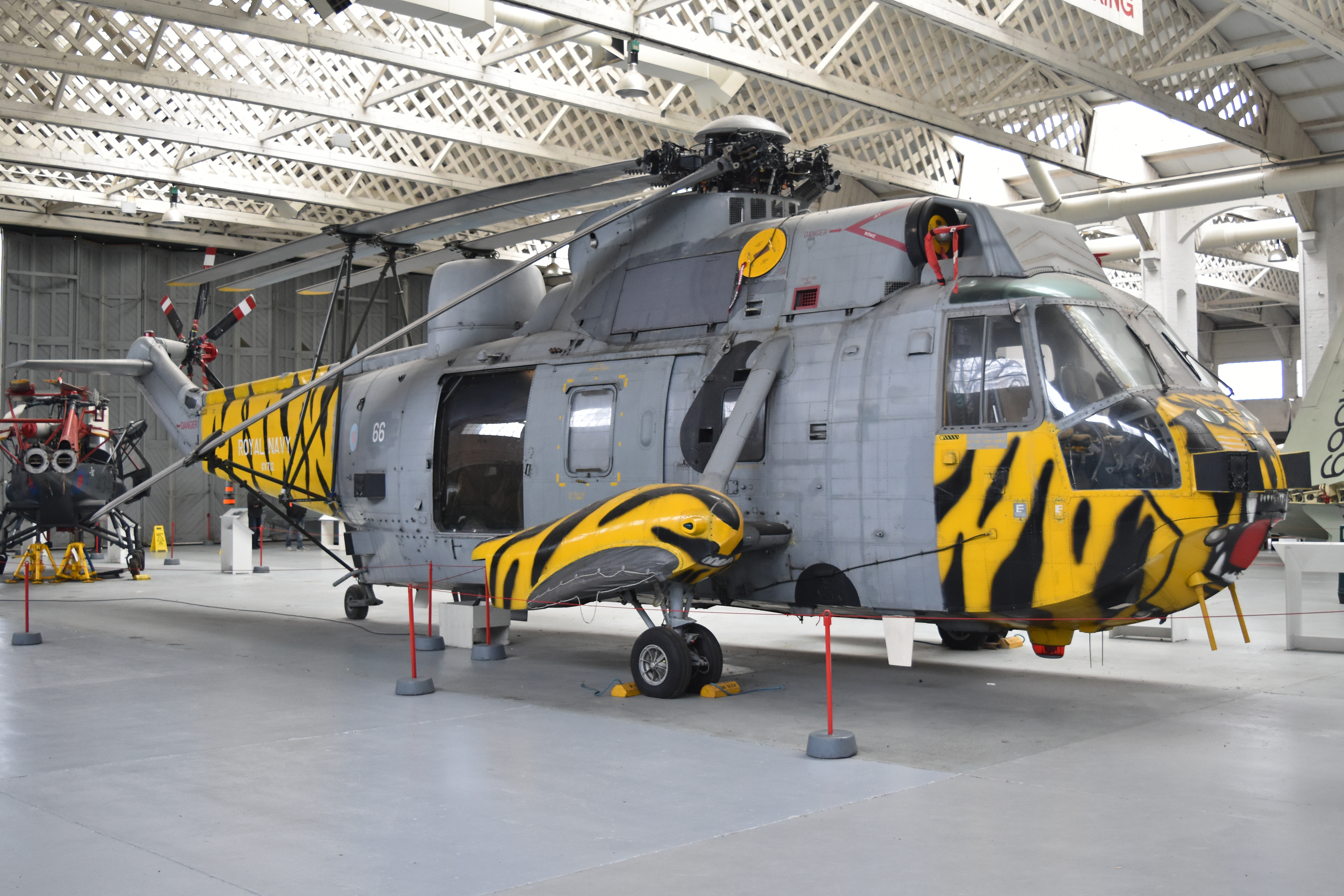
Built in 1972, this Westland Sea King was put on display at the Imperial War Museum, Duxford in Hangar 3 in 2010

== Hangar 4: Battle of Britain Exhibition ==
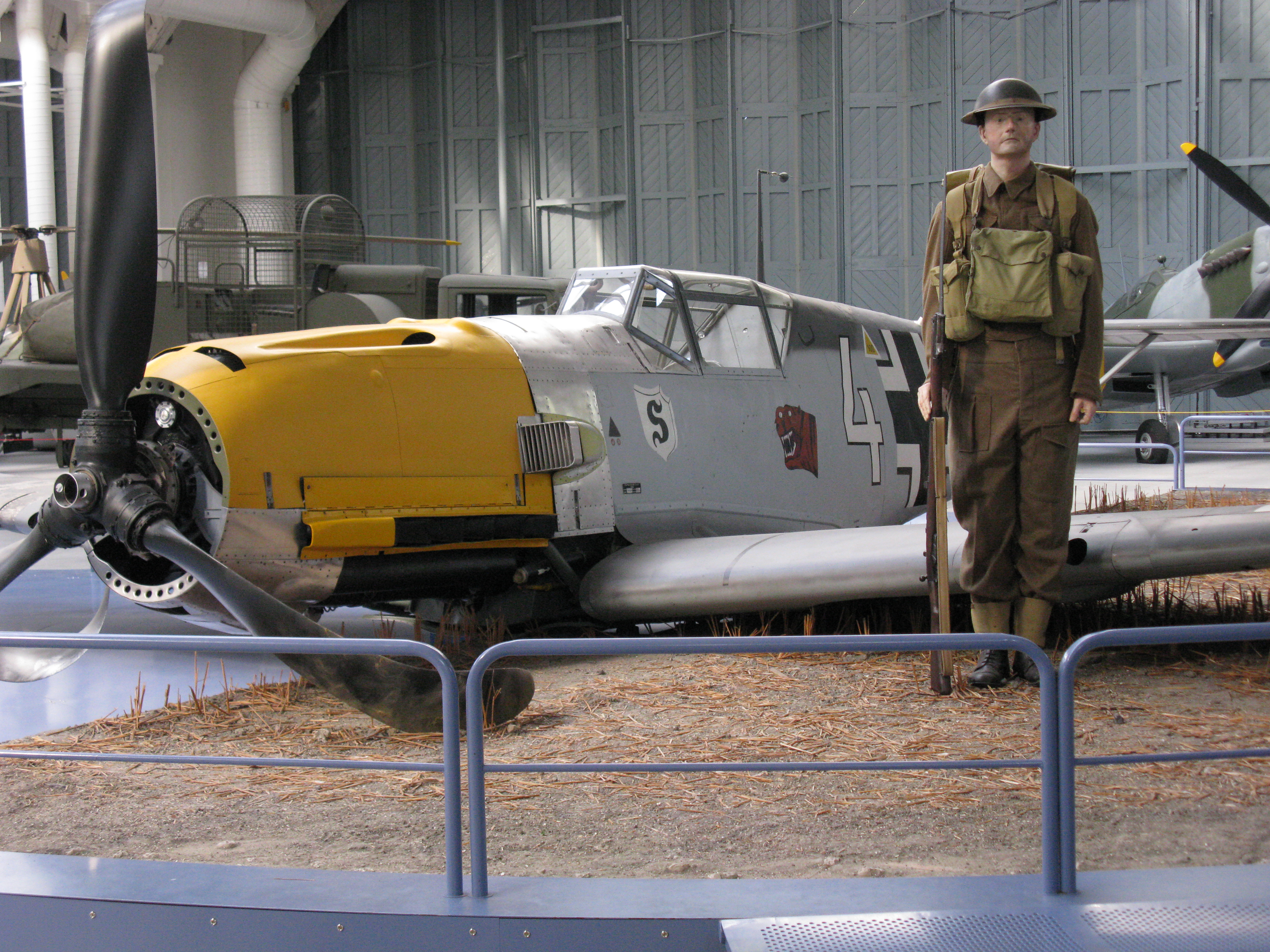
Tableau of crashed Bf 109E in Hangar 4.

Hangar 4 is one of Duxford's historic hangars, and now houses an exhibition exploring Duxford's history as an operational RAF airfield from the First World War to the Cold War. The early period is represented by a Bristol F.2 Fighter, a type operated by Duxford's No.2 Flying Training School from 1920. The latter period is represented by a Hawker Hunter which flew at Duxford with No. 65 Squadron RAF, a Gloster Javelin, the type which made the last operational flight at Duxford in 1961 during the site's operation as an air base, and by a Hungarian Air Force MiG-21, a common Warsaw Pact jet fighter. Britain's air defence during the Second World War is particularly emphasised, with exhibits representing the Battle of Britain, the Blitz and the V-1 flying bomb offensive from 1944. Notable aircraft include a Messerschmitt Bf 109E which was flown during the Battle of Britain until forced to perform a belly landing in a Sussex field due to engine failure. It is displayed as part of a tableau showing the crashed aircraft under guard. One unusual aircraft on display is the Cierva C.30A autogyro, which was used by 74 (Signals) Wing, based at Duxford, to test the calibration of coastal radar units.

== Hangar 5: Conservation in Action ==
Hangar 5, the westernmost original hangar, houses Duxford's aircraft conservation workshops. Open to the public, the hangar allows visitors to see museum staff and volunteers at work on a variety of conservation tasks. Notable projects include a Mitsubishi A6M Zero fighter acquired from an American owner in 'jungle recovery' condition, and a Royal Aircraft Factory R.E.8 now on display in AirSpace. Duxford is a partner with the British Aviation Preservation Council in the National Aviation Heritage Skills Initiative, which has been funded since 2005 by the Heritage Lottery Fund and aims to provide training to volunteers supporting aviation heritage projects. Recent projects include the conservation of a Handley Page Victor (XH669) and a Vickers Valiant (XD826).

== American Air Museum ==
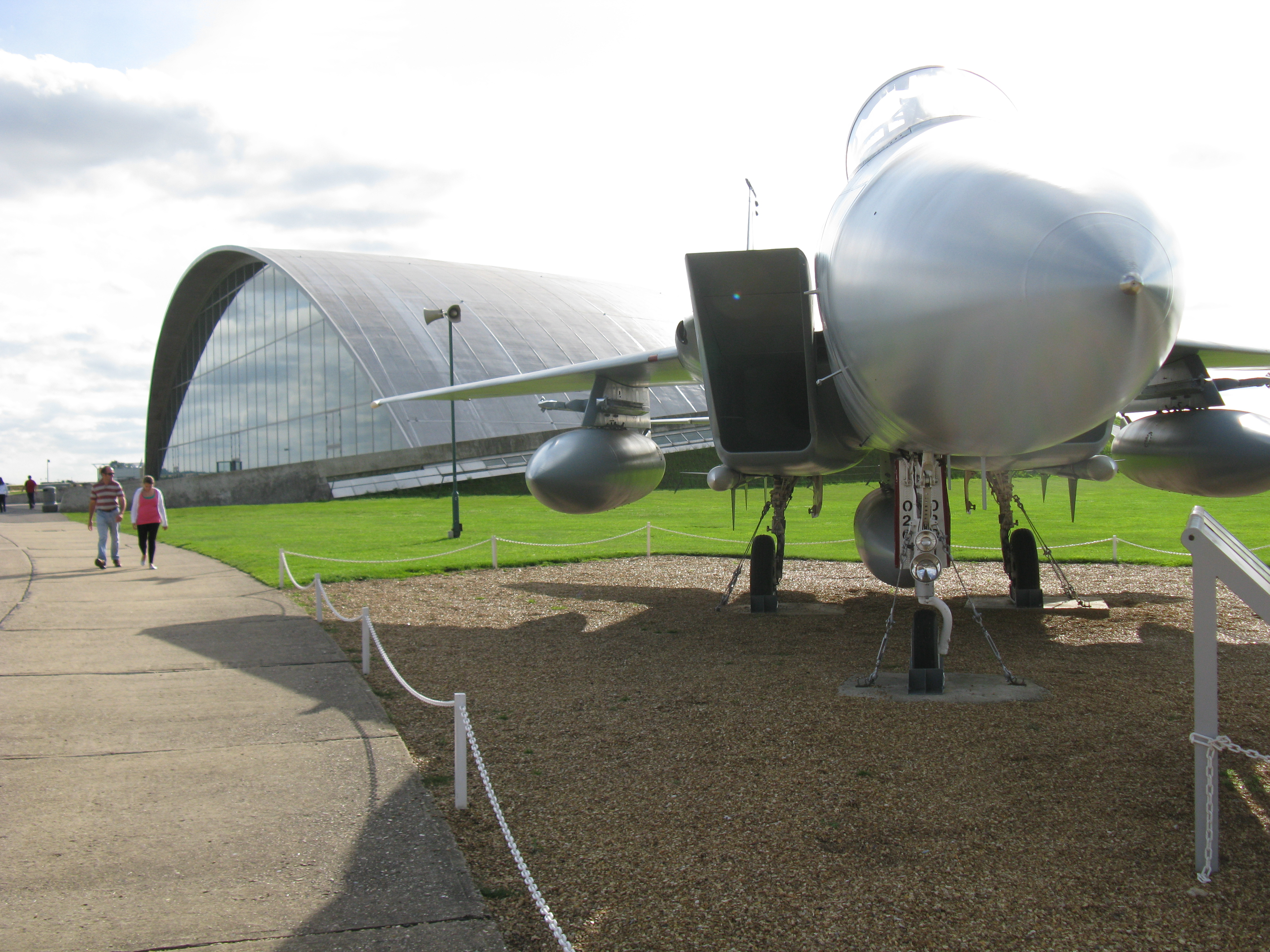
A US Air Force F-15 Eagle with the American Air Museum behind.

From the late 1970s onward, the museum acquired several important American aircraft; examples include a B-17G Flying Fortress in 1978, a B-29 Superfortress named It's Hawg Wild in 1980, and a B-52 Stratofortress in 1983. With Duxford's association with the US Army Air Forces (USAAF), in the mid-1980s plans developed for a commemoration of the role of American air power in the Second World War. A group of American supporters was formed, and the architect Norman Foster was commissioned to design a new building. Fundraising for the project began in 1987, support and funds being sought in the United States; the Founding Member was General Jimmy Doolittle in 1989. Fundraising events were held across the US in Houston (1989), Washington, D.C., (1991) and Los Angeles (1992). The project was widely supported in the United States by some 50,000 individual subscribers. A further $1 million of funding was secured from Saudi Arabia, and £6.5 million from the Heritage Lottery Fund. On 8 September 1995 the groundbreaking for the new building was performed by wartime 78th Fighter Group veteran, Major James E Stokes.

=== Architecture and construction ===
The American Air Museum was designed by Norman Foster and Chris Wise at Arup. The museum's specification called for a landmark building that would provide a neutral backdrop for the aircraft collection and provide appropriate climatic controls while being cost efficient to operate. The building is shaped as a section of a torus, formed from a curved concrete roof 90 m (300 ft) wide, 18.5 m (61 ft) high and 100 m (330 ft) deep. The dimensions of the building were dictated by the need to accommodate the museum's B-52 Stratofortress bomber with its 61 m (200 ft) wingspan and a tail 16 m (52 ft) high. The roof was constructed as a double-layered concrete shell, built in 924 precast reinforced concrete sections. Inverted T-shaped sections provided the inner layer with further flat panels forming the outer layer.

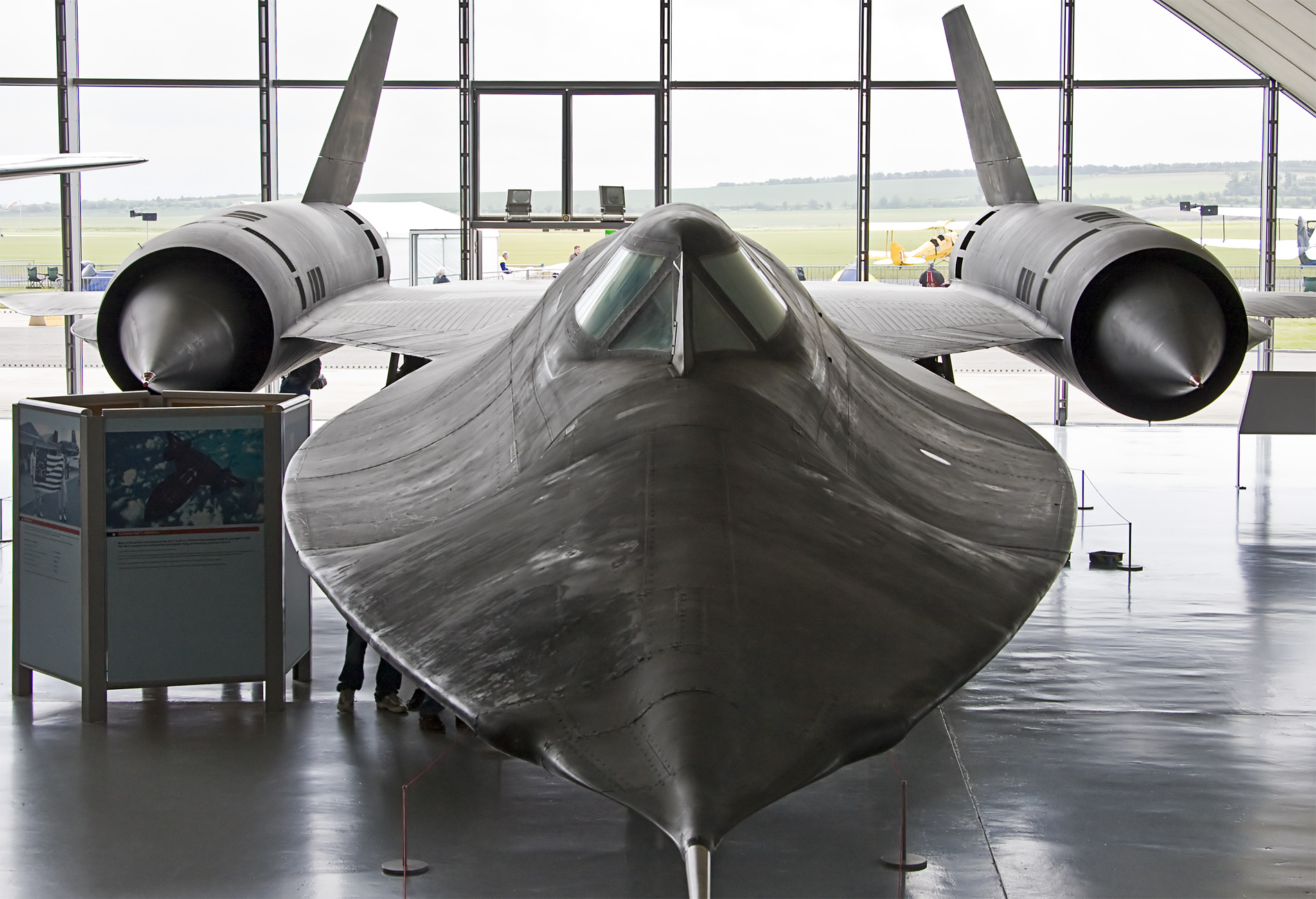
Lockheed SR-71 Blackbird −962

The roof weighs 6,000 tonnes (5,900 long tons; 6,600 short tons) and is able to support suspended aircraft weighing up to 10 tonnes (9.8 long tons; 11 short tons). A glass wall, demountable to permit aircraft to be rearranged, allows in daylight, thereby reducing lighting costs and enabling the aircraft to be seen from outside the building. It also allows visitors inside the museum to watch aircraft landing or taking off. From a visitor's perspective, the pedestrian entrance leads to a mezzanine floor level with the cockpit of the museum's B-52, while the lack of supporting columns allows aircraft to hang from the ceiling. Heavier aircraft stand on the floor of the building, which covers 6,500 m^{2} (70,000 sq ft). The construction work, which was undertaken by Sisk Group, began with the building of abutments in October 1995 and the roof was completed in September 1996. The building won the 1998 Stirling Prize for Foster and Partners and was described by the judges as "a great big, clear span hangar of a building...dramatic, awe-inspiring, an object of beauty...simple yet replete with imagery."

=== Opening and re-dedication ===
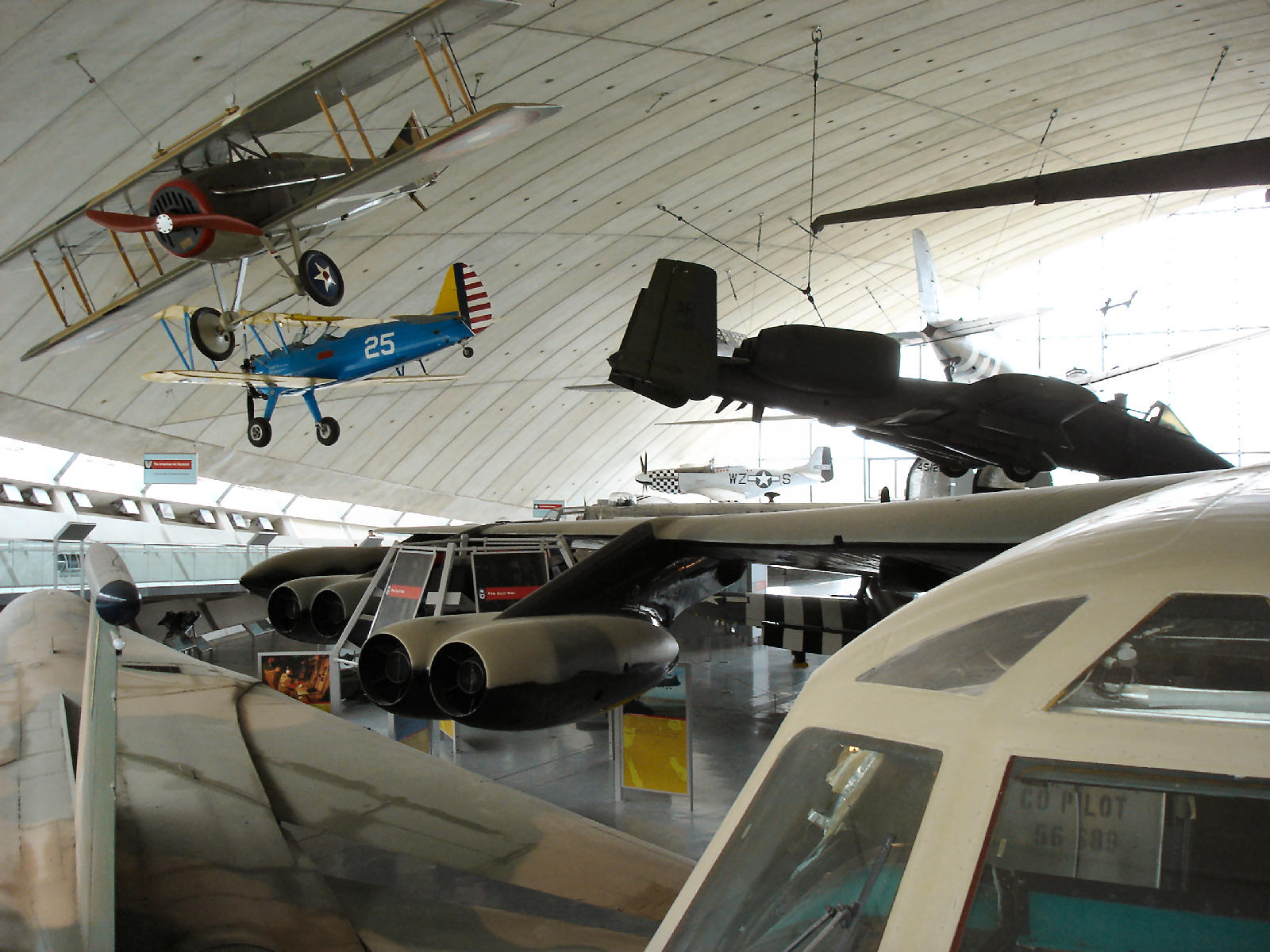
American Air Museum interior; F-111, left foreground, B-52 cockpit, right foreground, and SPAD S.XIII, PT-17 and A-10 Thunderbolt II, suspended above.

The American Air Museum was opened by Queen Elizabeth II on 1 August 1997. The total cost of the project had been £13.5 million. The museum was re-dedicated on 27 September 2002, in a ceremony attended by the then Prince Charles & former President George H. W. Bush. Since being opened, the museum has had its glass front temporarily removed to permit access for an SR-71 Blackbird and Consolidated B-24 Liberator. The SR-71, serial number 61-7962, is the only example of its type on display outside the United States, and set a flight altitude record of 85,069 feet (25,929m) in July 1976. Besides the Blackbird, nineteen other American aircraft are on display. Notable examples include a C-47 Skytrain which flew with the 316th Troop Carrier Group and participated in three major Second World War airborne operations; the June 1944 Normandy landings, Operation Market Garden and Operation Varsity, the airborne crossing of the River Rhine in March 1945. The museum's B-29 flew during the Korean War as part of the 7th Bomb Wing; it is the only example in Europe and one of only two preserved in museums outside the United States. The B-52 flew 200 sorties during the Vietnam War as part of the 28th Bomb Wing. The General Dynamics F-111 on display flew 19 missions during the 1991 Gulf War as part of the 77th Fighter Squadron.

On 17 January 2014 the museum announced an award of £980,000 from the Heritage Lottery Fund. The museum planned to use the money to build a website based on the photographic collection of aviation historian Roger Freeman, to update the museum's interpretation, and to conserve aircraft and other exhibits. The museum launched americanairmuseum.com in October 2014. The website seeks to crowdsource photographs and information from the public about the men and women of the US Army Air Forces who served from the UK in the Second World War and the British people who befriended them.

== Land Warfare Hall ==
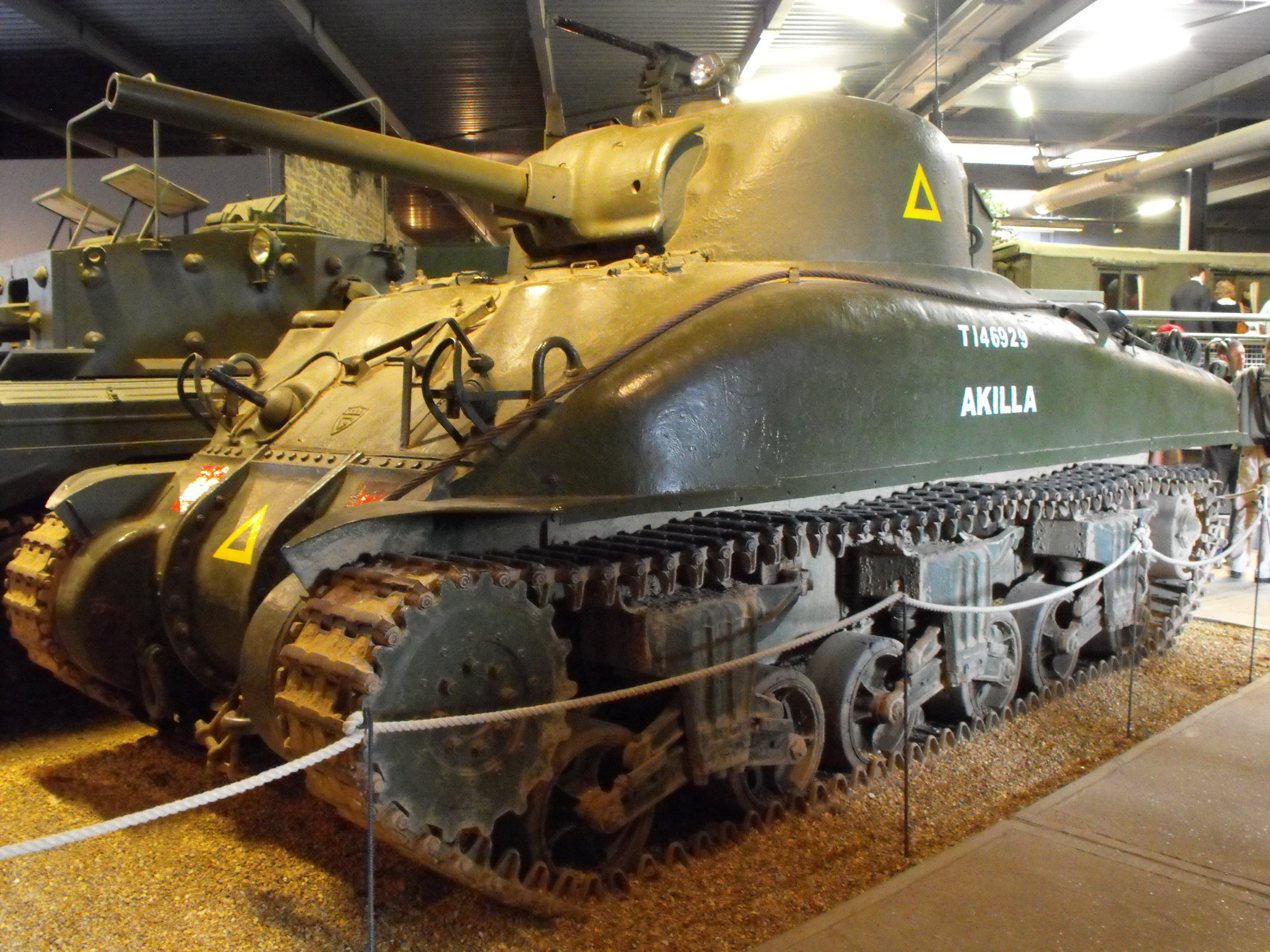
Canadian-built Sherman tank

The Land Warfare Hall was opened on 28 September 1992 by Field Marshal Lord Bramall on behalf of Prime Minister John Major. The building provided accommodation for the Imperial War Museum's collection of armoured vehicles, artillery and military vehicles. Also included were vehicles belonging to the Duxford Aviation Society Military Vehicle Section. The hall comprised a viewing balcony that runs for most of the length of the hall, providing views over a range of tableaux of vehicles, tanks and artillery that run chronologically from the First World War to the present day. Notable among the First World War exhibits was a battle-damaged artillery limber used by L Battery Royal Horse Artillery during an action at Néry in September 1914 where three Victoria Crosses were won. The Second World War in particular was illustrated with tableaux of the North African Campaign, the Eastern Front and the invasion of Normandy. Outside the building is a Whale floating roadway bridge span from Mulberry B harbour at Arromanches.

Significant vehicles in the collection included three command vehicles used by Field Marshal Montgomery, commander of 21st Army Group during the north-west Europe campaign. Also on display were extracts from Montgomery's personal papers, which are held by the Imperial War Museum's Department of Documents. Other tableaux depicted scenes from post-1945 conflicts such as the Korean War, the Northern Ireland Troubles, the Falklands War, British peacekeeping contributions in Bosnia and the Gulf War. As many of the vehicles in the Land Warfare Hall were maintained in running condition, the site features garages and a running area behind the building.

Various diorama were exhibited, including of the Battle of the Tennis Court.

=== Forgotten War ===
The Land Warfare Hall also housed the Forgotten War exhibition, which opened on 25 March 1999 and was a joint project between the Imperial War Museum and the Burma Star Association. The Association represents veterans of the Burma campaign who often consider themselves to have fought in a "Forgotten Army" compared to those who fought in Europe. The exhibition explored aspects of the Second World War in the Far East and featured artifacts, archival film and photographs, and tableaux depicting scenes such as troops moving through jungle and a Burmese village. The exhibition was supported financially by the Burma Star Association and by £126,000 from the National Heritage Memorial Fund.

=== Royal Anglian Regiment Museum and Memorial ===
The Land Warfare Hall also accommodated the Royal Anglian Regiment Museum. The Royal Anglian Regiment was formed in 1964 by the amalgamation of the three regiments of the East Anglian Brigade and the Royal Leicestershire Regiment. The museum was opened in June 1996 by noted war correspondent Martin Bell, who had previously served as a sergeant in the Suffolk Regiment while a national serviceman. The museum covers the history of the Regiment and its predecessors, which date back to the seventeenth century, up to recent operations in Iraq, Afghanistan and Sierra Leone. Alongside the museum was the Cambridgeshire Regiment Exhibition, which displayed items from the Cambridgeshire Regiment collection. Exhibits included the Singapore Drums, lost at the fall of Singapore in 1942 and recovered after the war.

On 12 September 2010 a Royal Anglian Regiment memorial was dedicated at Duxford. A fundraising campaign, which raised more than £340,000, was launched following the deaths in action of nine soldiers of 1st Battalion Royal Anglian Regiment during the unit's 2007 operational tour in Helmand Province, Afghanistan. The memorial is inscribed with the names of 78 soldiers killed since 1958 (when the first of the three East Anglian regiments was formed) in conflicts including Afghanistan, Iraq, Northern Ireland and Aden. The dedication was attended by more than 5,000 people.

=== Closure ===
On 1 June 2025 the Land Warfare Hall was permanently closed, as the building could no longer safely house the vehicles and objects in it. Over 80% of the large objects in the building are to be retained by IWM, with many to be put in the new exhibitions in Hangars 1, 3 and 4 which are intended to be opened in 2028. The building is set to be demolished to allow for the construction of The Lab, which is to be completed in 2029.

== North side: collections storage ==
In addition to the exhibition buildings, Duxford's 'North Side', the area of the site north of the A505 road, provides storage for the Imperial War Museum's collecting departments. The stored collections include the film collection, which includes reels existing on nitrate film stock, which is highly flammable and subject to decomposition, kept in purpose-built vaults at nearby Ickleton. Other collections stored at Duxford's north side include books, maps, ephemera, photographs, documents and collections of uniforms and equipment.

== See also ==
- List of aerospace museums
