= James May's 20th Century =

- Genre: Documentary
- Starring: James May
- Country of origin: United Kingdom
- Original language: English
- No. of episodes: 6

Production
- Executive producer: Phil Dolling
- Running time: 29 minutes (approx)

Original release
- Network: BBC Two
- Release: 10 July – 24 July 2007

Related
- James May's Big Ideas

James May's 20th Century is a television series first aired on 10 July 2007 on the British terrestrial channel BBC Two. The series is a co-production by the BBC and the Open University.

The series covers various inventions and discoveries over the past century with some reference to discoveries made before the past century. The show features the eponymous James May, exhibiting and discussing the implications of many of the major advances and inventions made during this period. Each episode features some theme, which was discussed in depth during the show, often following sequential advances in chronological order. The programme is now shown on Eden, Yesterday and Dave. The theme tune is called "The Long Boot", by Jeff Knowler.

== Critical reviews ==
Sam Wollaston writing for Guardian Unlimited described James May's 20th Century as "essentially Top Gear, masquerading as something educational" but conceded that if "teaching history can be achieved through Top Gear, then maybe that's not such a bad thing". The New Statesman thought that James May was "ill-suited to the task in hand" and described the biggest problem as May being unable to "put his wretched motors behind him". The Lancashire Telegraph wrote positively of the show praising the presenter May as "someone with genuine enthusiasm for what they were doing."

== Ratings ==
The 6 episodes were originally aired in 3 double-bills on BBC Two in a Tuesday 8pm to 9pm timeslot. Episodes 1 & 2 both attracted 2.4 million viewers and a 12% share. Episodes 5 & 6 received slightly less with 1.9 million and 2.3 million viewers, and respective shares of 10% and 12%. The programme finished behind BBC One and ITV but ahead of Channel 4 and Five.

== Episodes ==
Original air dates:

- 10 July 2007 - Episode 1 - Honey, I Shrunk The World
- 10 July 2007 - Episode 2 - Blast Off
- 17 July 2007 - Episode 3 - Body Fantastic
- 17 July 2007 - Episode 4 - Take Cover!
- 24 July 2007 - Episode 5 - Inventing The Teenager
- 24 July 2007 - Episode 6 - Big City, Bright Lights
