= Sally B =

Preserved 1945-built B-17 heavy bomber

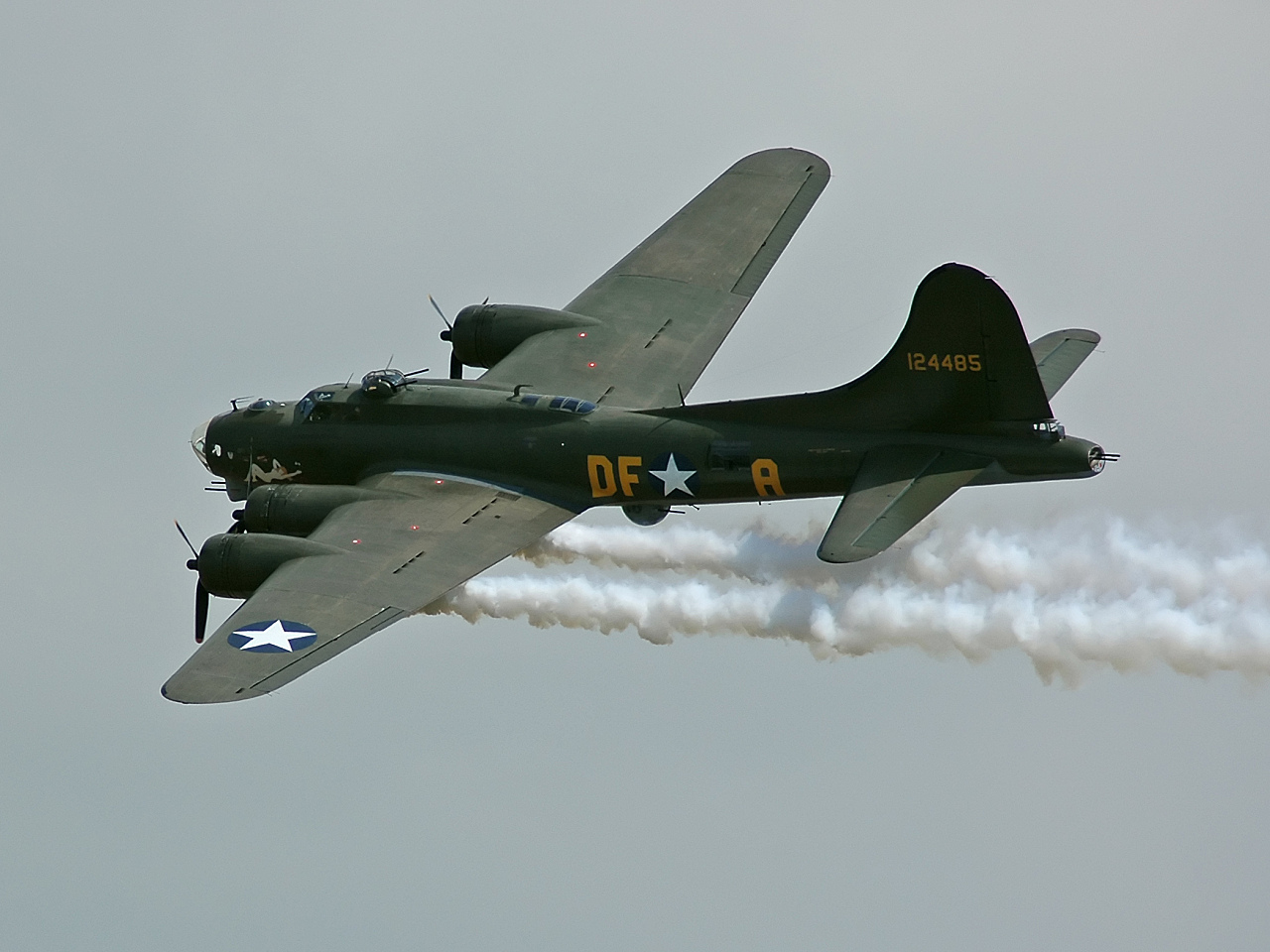
- The Sally B in 2005

General information
- Type: B-17G; Flying Fortress
- Manufacturer: Boeing
- Construction number: 8693
- Registration: G-BEDF
- Serial: 44-85784

History
- In service: 1945–54
- Preserved at: Duxford
- Fate: Airworthy

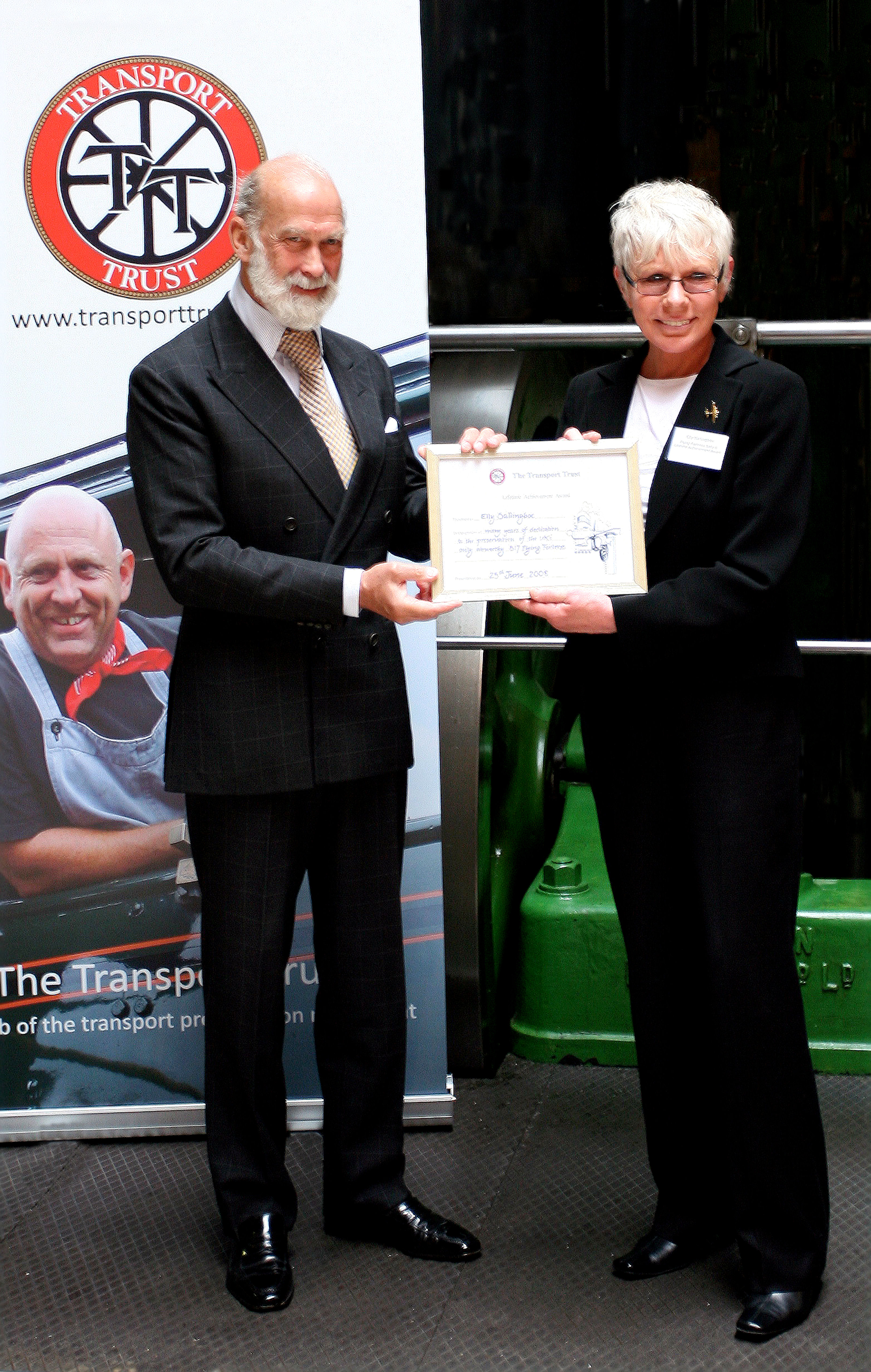
Elly Sallingboe awarded the Transport Trust Lifetime Achievement Award in 2008

Sally B is the name of an airworthy 1945-built Boeing B-17G Flying Fortress. At 79 years old, she is the only airworthy B-17 based in Europe, as well as one of three B-17s preserved in the United Kingdom. The aircraft is presently based at the Imperial War Museum Duxford, in eastern England. Sally B flies at airshows in the UK and across Europe as well as serving as an airborne memorial to the United States Army Air Forces airmen who lost their lives in the European theatre during World War II.

== History ==
The aircraft was delivered to the United States Army Air Forces (USAAF) on 19 June 1945 as 44-85784, too late to see active service in the war. After being converted to both a TB-17G training variant and then an EB-17G, she was struck off charge in 1954. In 1954, the Institut Géographique National in France bought the plane for use as a survey aircraft. In 1975, she moved to England and was registered with the CAA as G-BEDF to be restored to wartime condition.

The Sally B was first fitted with accurate gun turrets and other much needed additions for her role as Ginger Rogers, a B-17 bomber of the fictitious bomber unit featured in the 1981 LWT series We'll Meet Again.

During the winter of 1983–84, Sally B was painted in an olive drab and neutral grey colour scheme, in place of the bare metal scheme she had worn since construction, in order to protect the airframe from the damp UK weather. At the same time, she received the markings of the 447th Bomb Group.

The Sally B was used in the 1990 film Memphis Belle as one of five flying B-17s needed for various film scenes, and it was used to replicate the real Memphis Belle in one scene. Half of the aircraft is still in the Memphis Belle livery, following restoration of the Sally B nose art and the black and yellow checkerboard pattern on the cowling of the starboard inner (no 3) engine, carried as a tribute to Elly Sallingboe's companion Ted White, whose Harvard aircraft had the same pattern on its cowling. Sally B was reworked to B-17F configuration for filming.

Since 1985, Sally B has been operated by Elly Sallingboe's B-17 Preservation Ltd and maintained by Chief Engineer Peter Brown and a team of volunteers. The aircraft is flown by volunteer experienced professional pilots. The B17 Charitable Trust exists to raise funds to keep the plane flying. In 2008, Elly Sallingboe was awarded the Transport Trust 'Lifetime Achievement Award' in recognition of over thirty years of dedication to the preservation and operation of Britain's only airworthy Boeing B-17 Flying Fortress as a flying memorial to the tens of thousands of American aircrew who lost their lives in her sister aircraft during the Second World War.

One of the key events in the flying calendar for Sally B is an annual tribute flypast following the Memorial Day service at the American Military Cemetery at Madingley, Cambridge. This takes place over the May Bank Holiday weekend. Flypasts over former Eighth Air Force bases are also carried out whenever possible during the summer months.

== Gallery ==
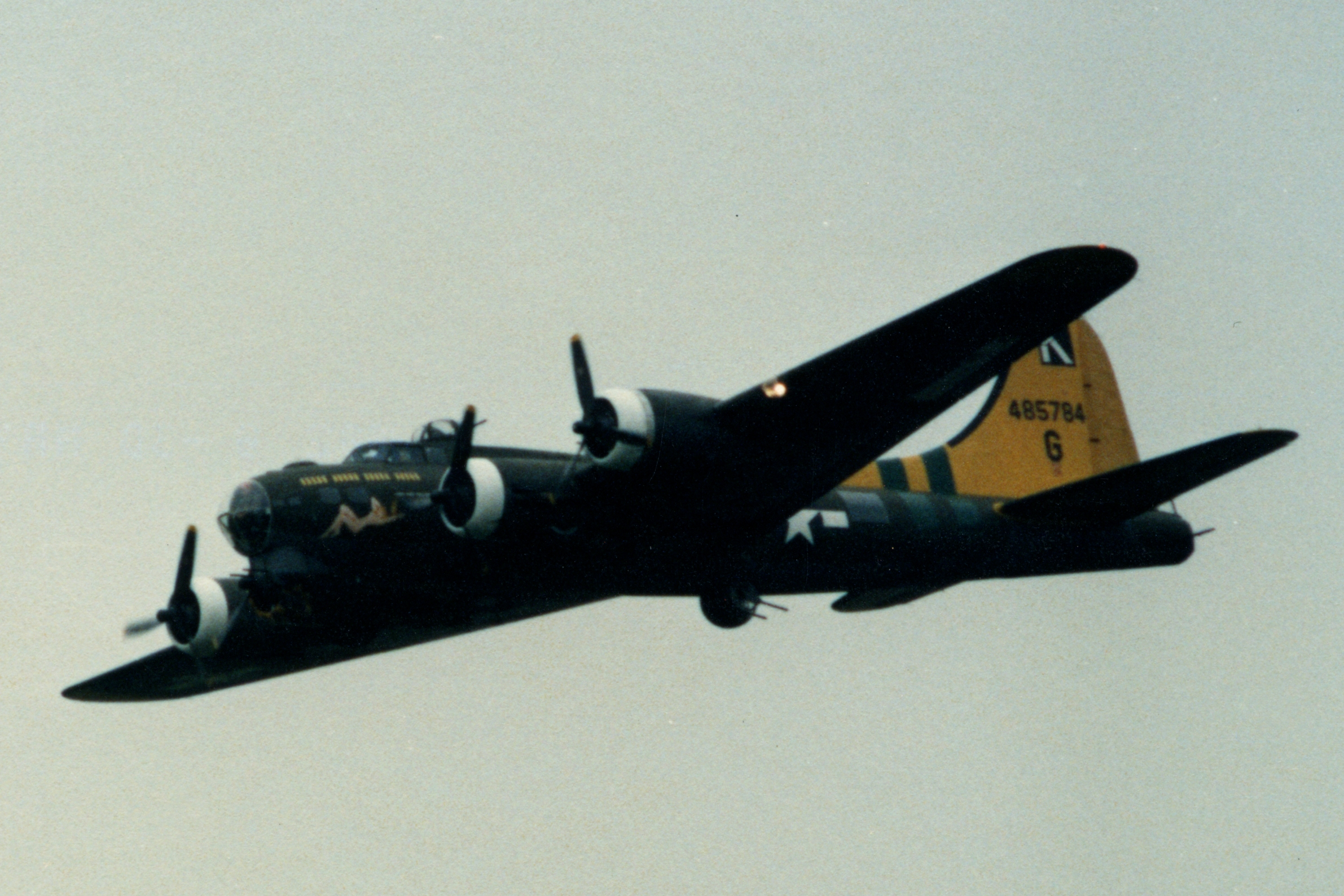
Flyby (in May 1985)

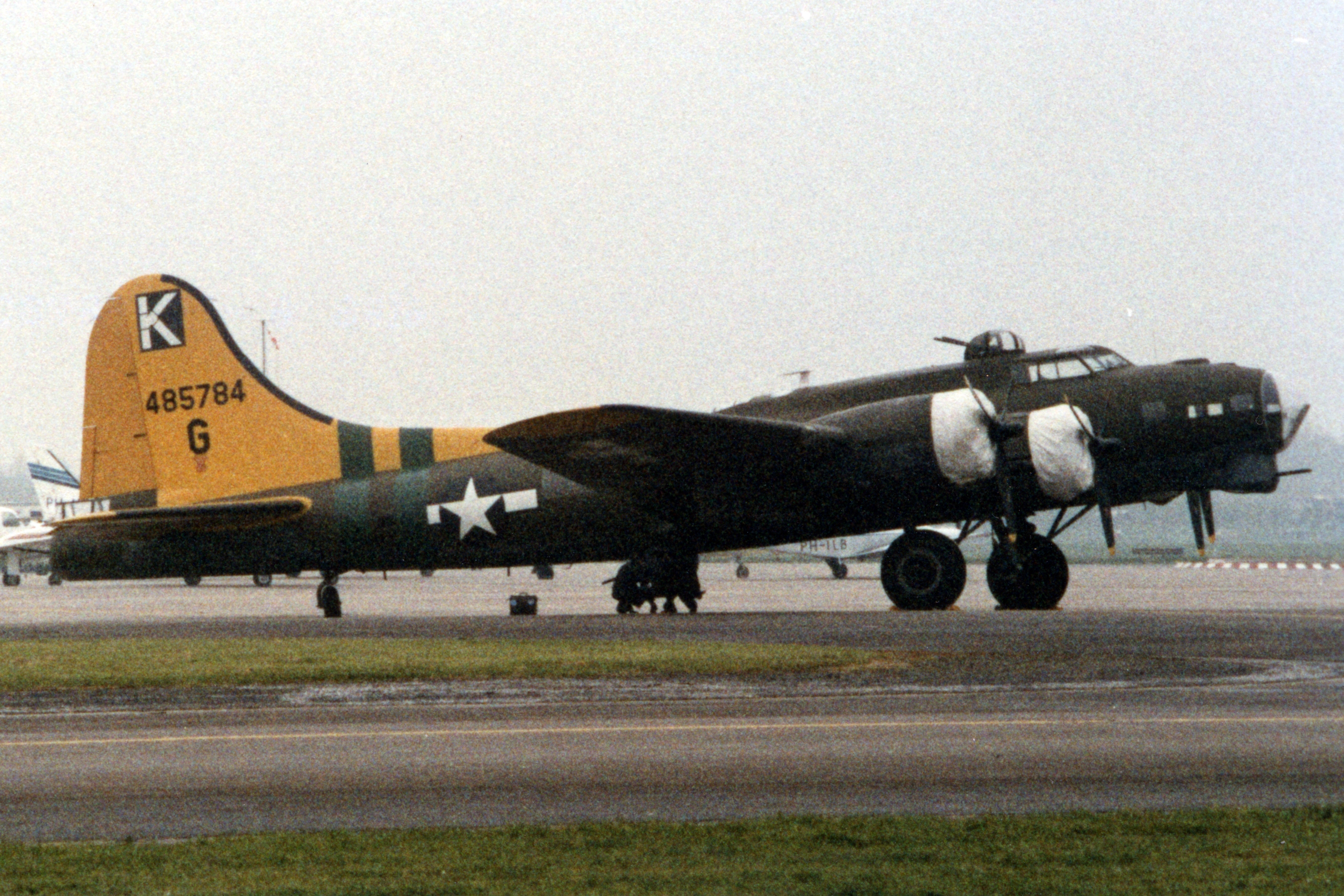
On ground (in May 1985)

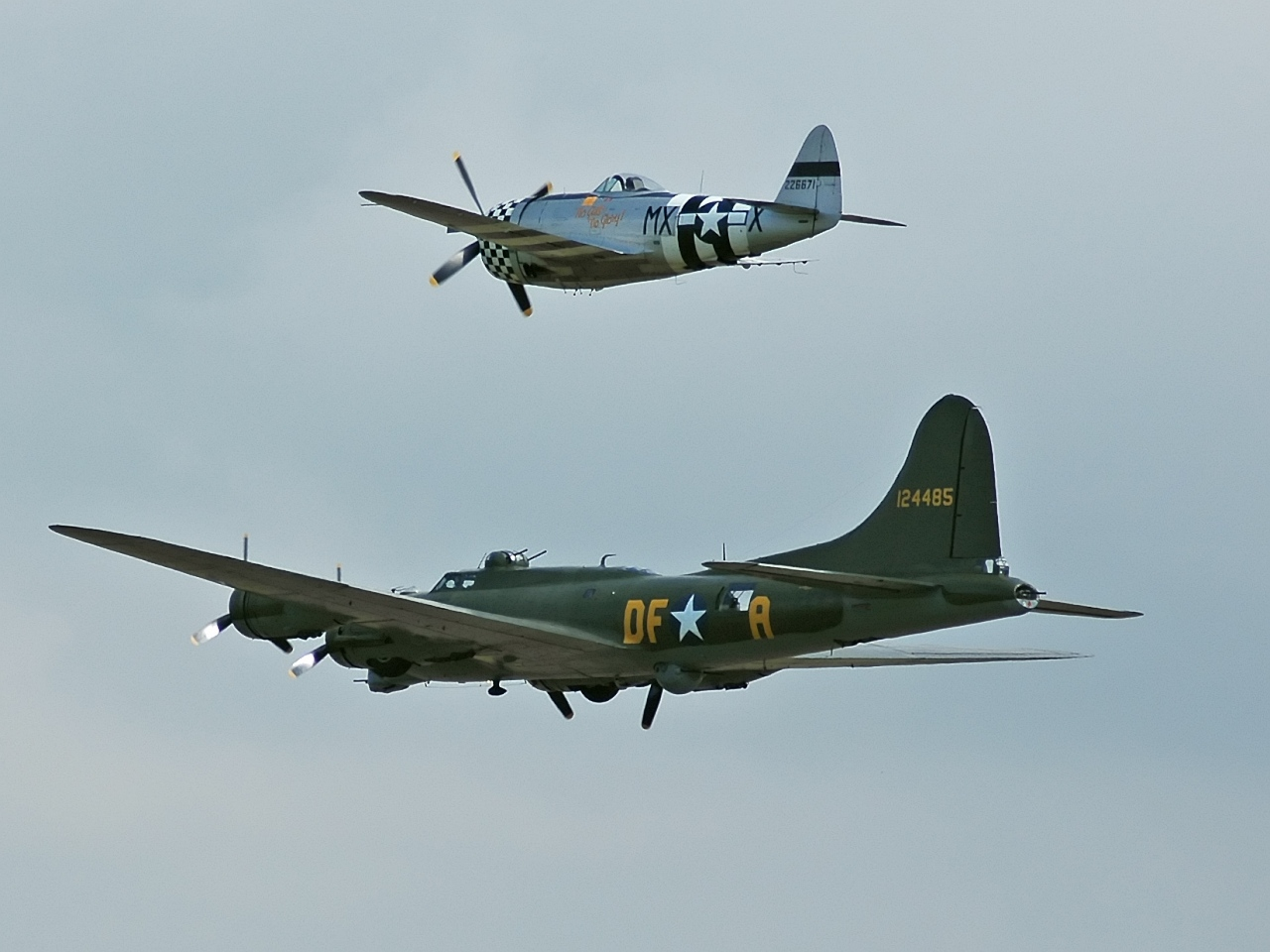
With a P-47 (in Oct 2006)

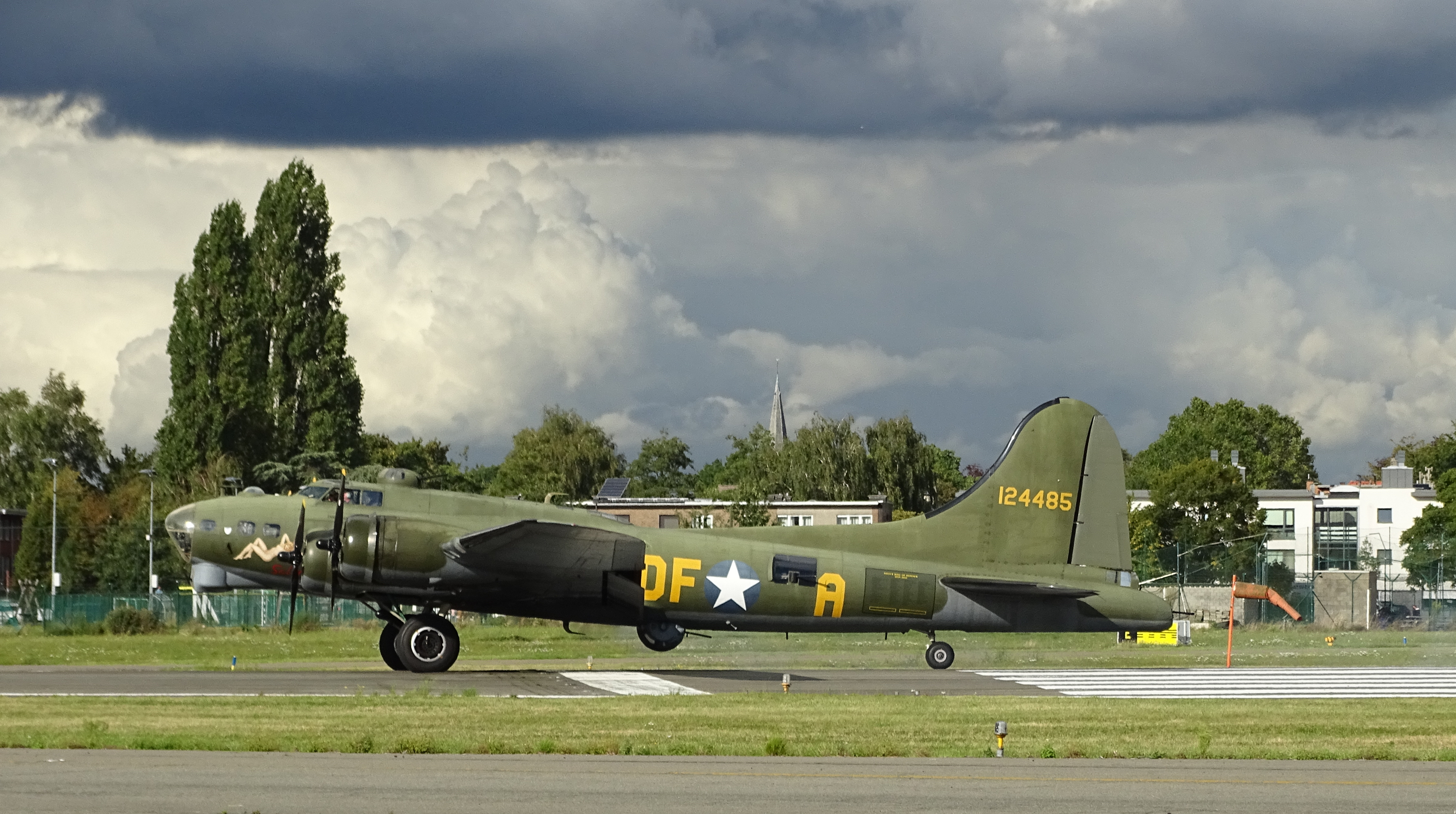
During Liberation Festivities in Antwerp 2019

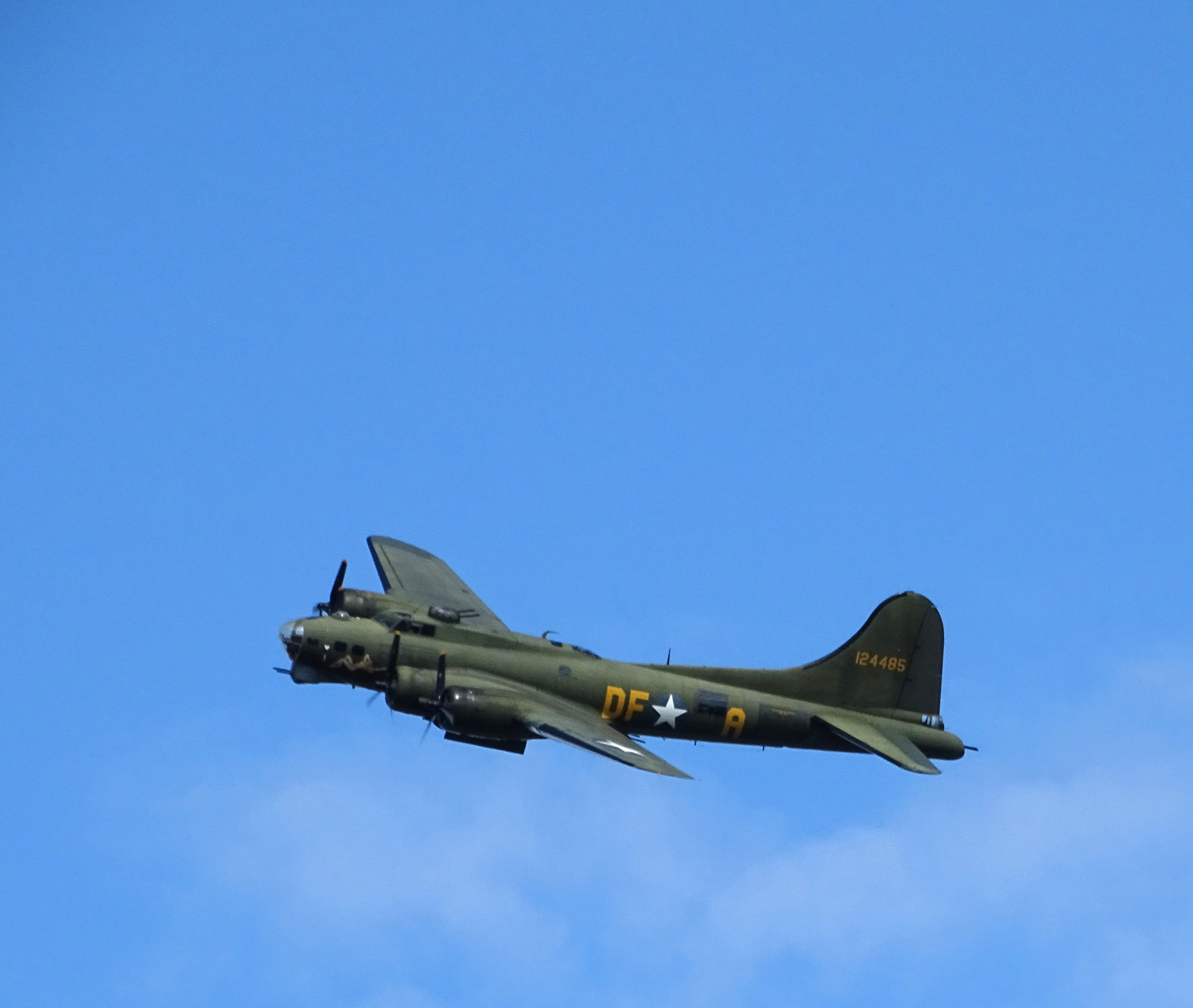
During Liberation Festivities in Antwerp 2019

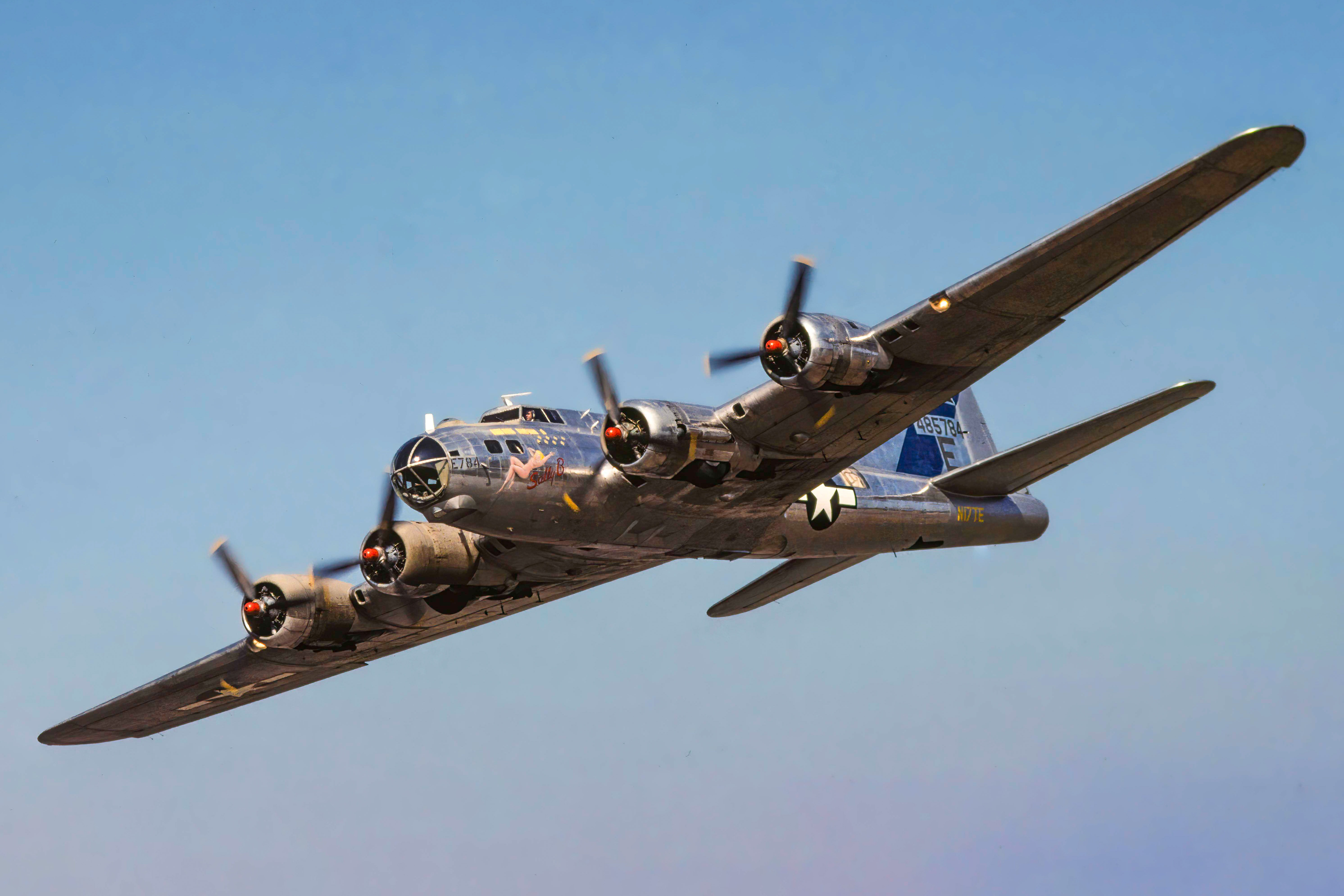
«Sally B» fly by at R.A.F. Woodbridge on Aug. 6, 1976
