= Howkins =

Howkins is a surname. Notable people with the surname include:

- Alun Howkins (1947–2018), English social historian
- John Howkins (born 1945), British writer
- John Howkins (civil engineer) (1839–1906), Scottish civil engineer
- Kyle Howkins (born 1996), English footballer
- Mark Howkins (born 1953), Canadian sport shooter

== See also ==
- Howkins Inlet, an inlet of Palmer Land, Antarctica
