= Forth Corinthian Yacht Club =

- Founded: 1880
- Based in: Granton, Edinburgh
- Website: www.fcyc.org.uk

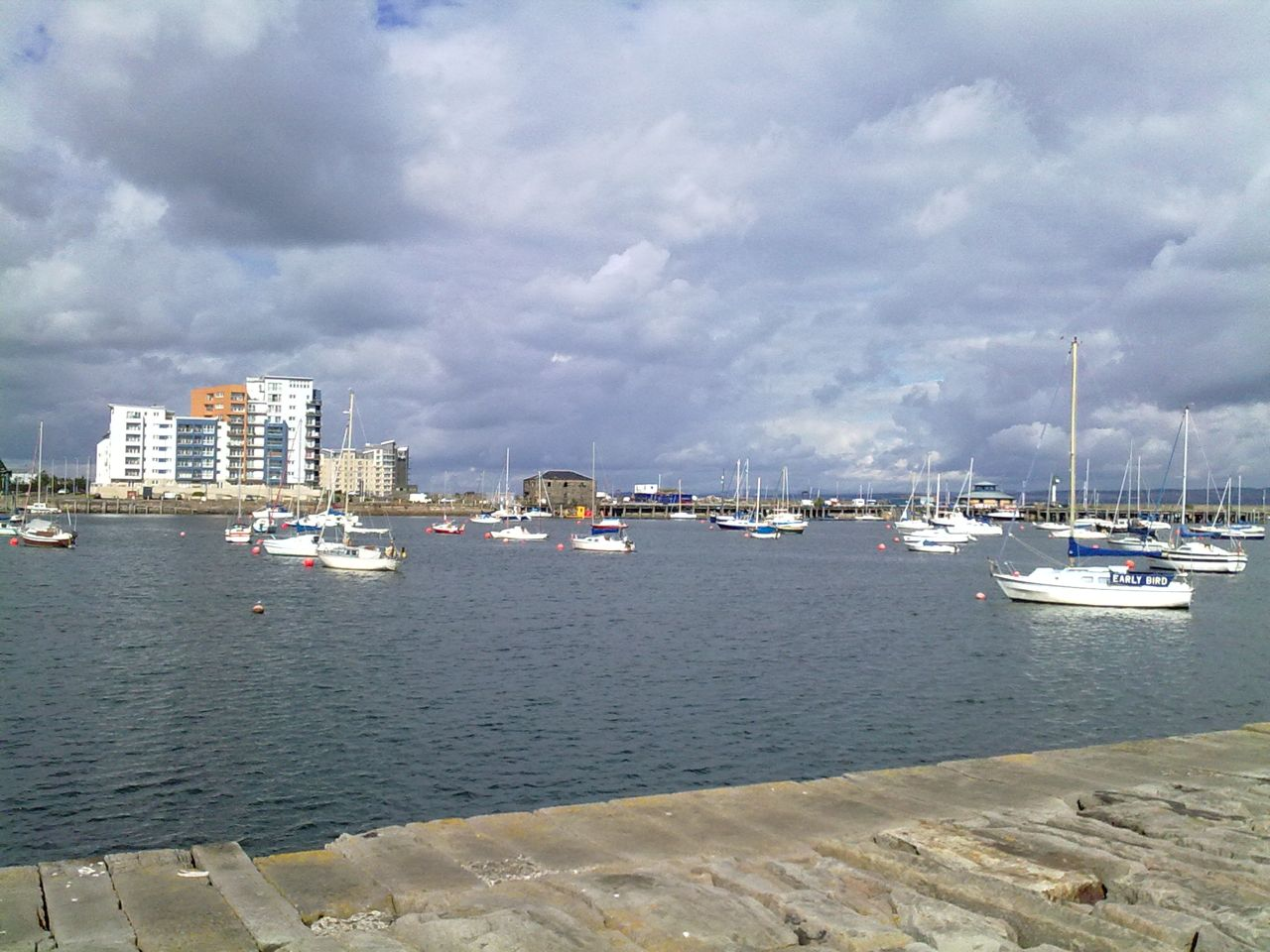
Granton Harbour

The Forth Corinthian Yacht Club is located in Granton, in Edinburgh, Scotland, on a site overlooking the Firth of Forth

== History ==
In 1880, several gentlemen met in a room at the Granton Hotel (now HMS Claverhouse) and formed the Forth Corinthian Yacht Club.

The hotel was designed by the architect William Burn in 1838 and is situated in Granton Square. Granton was very much the creation of the 5th Duke of Buccleuch, based around the harbour whose main function was the export of coal from the Duke's mines in the Lothians.

== Ethos ==
The Forth Corinthian Yacht Club is about amateur sailors coming together to make sailing affordable for all. Wherever possible, members contribute their own skills and labour to the work of the club and the experience of long-standing members is shared with new members and beginners.

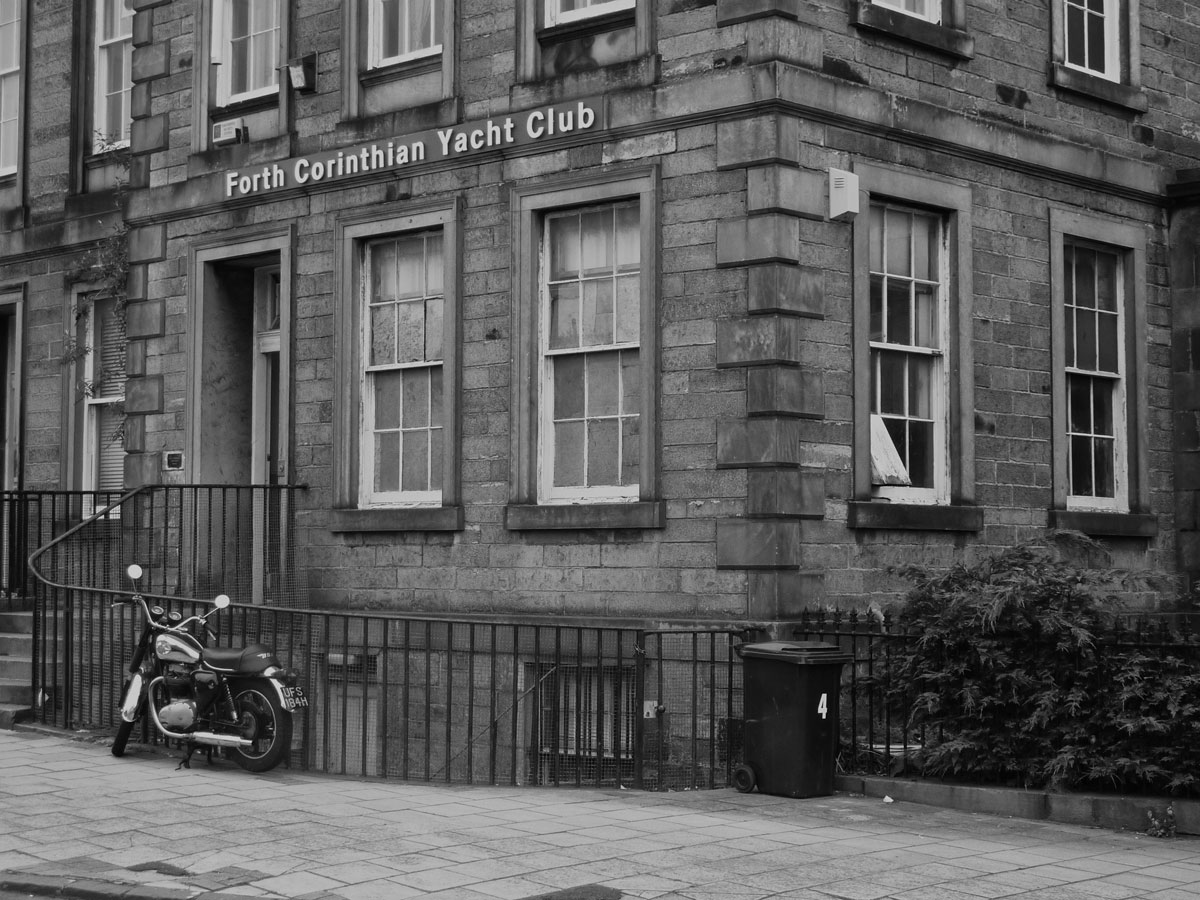
Corinthian Yacht Club
