= Henry Bellyse Baildon =

Scottish scholar and poet

Dr Henry Bellyse Baildon (28 August 1849–6 September 1907) was a 19th-century Scottish scholar and poet. He was a lifelong friend of Robert Louis Stevenson, who featured his house in The Misadventures of John Nicholson.

== Life ==
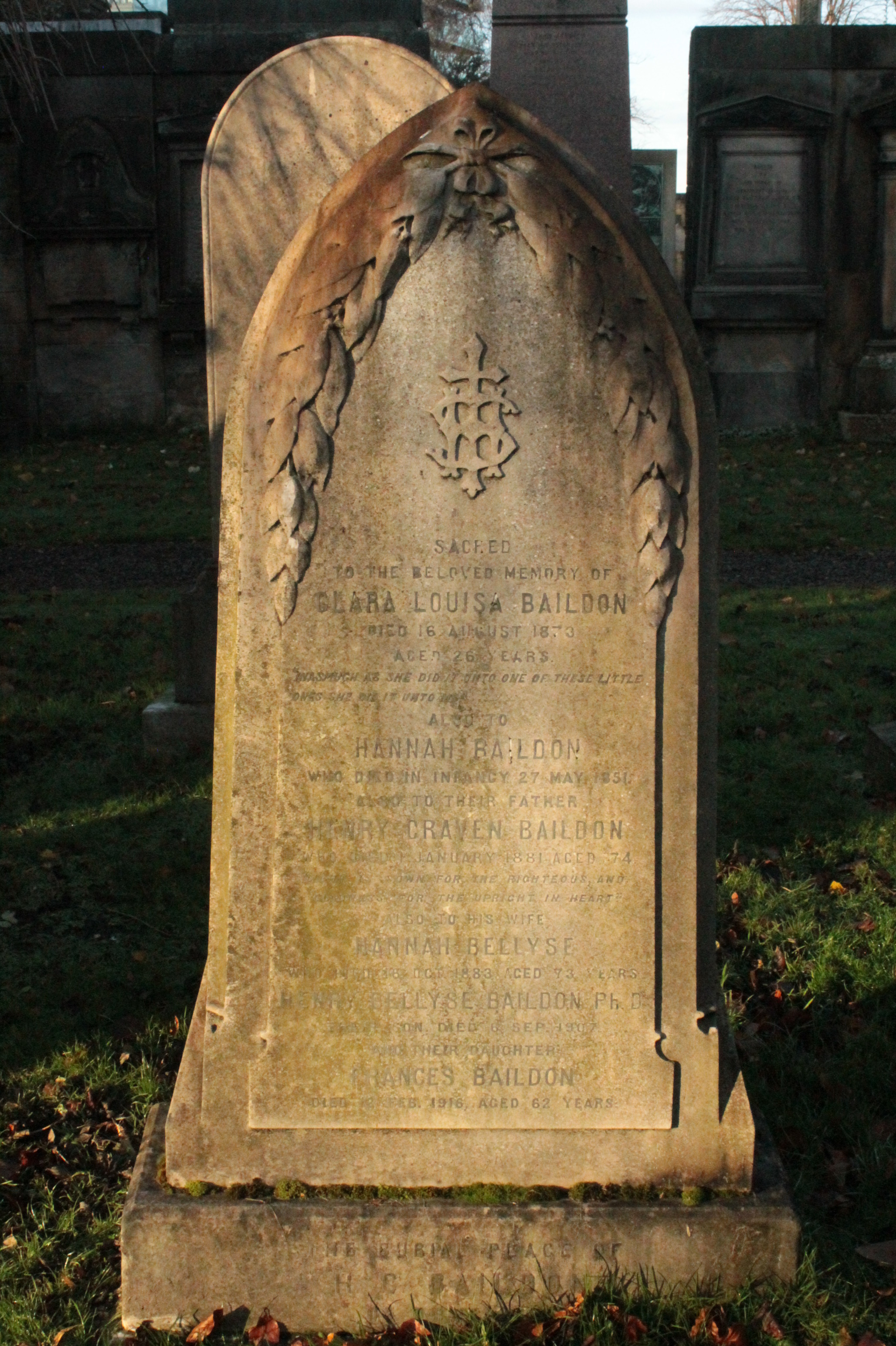
The grave of Henry Bellyse Baildon in Dean Cemetery

He was born on 28 August 1849 in Granton, the son of Hannah Bellyse and her husband, Henry Craven Baildon (d.1881). His father was a pharmaceutical chemist with premises at 73 Princes Street, Edinburgh's primary retail street. The family lived at Duncliffe in the Murrayfield area. His father was founder of the Pharmaceutical Society. He was educated at Merchiston Castle School then boarded in Tunbridge Wells.

He studied chemistry at the University of Edinburgh then undertook further studies at the University of Cambridge(1868). He joined his father as the "Son" of his father's firm H. C. Baildon & Son in 1875.

Having written three or four volumes of poetry, he relinquished ownership of the family business to devote himself to literature and education. In 1898 he received a doctorate (PhD) from Freiburg University in Germany for his research on the poet William Dunbar. For some time he taught English in Vienna. Returning to Scotland he taught in Glasgow and at University College, Dundee. In Edinburgh he was Honorary Secretary of the Philosophical Society and a member of the Scottish Arts Club.

He corresponded with Patrick Geddes from 1884 to 1906 and was associated with his university extension lectures in Dundee. He contributed the poem 'Robert Burns (1759 - 1796)' to The Evergreen: A Northern Seasonal: The Book of Summer published by Patrick Geddes and Colleagues in Edinburgh in 1896.

He was "found dead near Dundee" on 6 September 1907. He is buried with his parents in Dean Cemetery. The grave lies in the north-west linear section, facing south onto an inner path.

== Publications ==
- First Fruits and Fresh Leaves (1873)
- Rosamund, a Tragic Drama (1875)
- Morning Clouds (poems - 1877)
- Ralph Waldo Emerson: Man and Teacher (1884)
- The Round Table Series (1887)
- The Poetical Works of Sir Walter Scott (1891)
- On the Rimes in the Authentic Poems of William Dunbar (1899)
- Robert Louis Stevenson: A Life in Criticism (1901)
- The Lamentable Tragedy of Titus Andronicus (1904)
