= Caroline Park =

17th-century mansion in Edinburgh

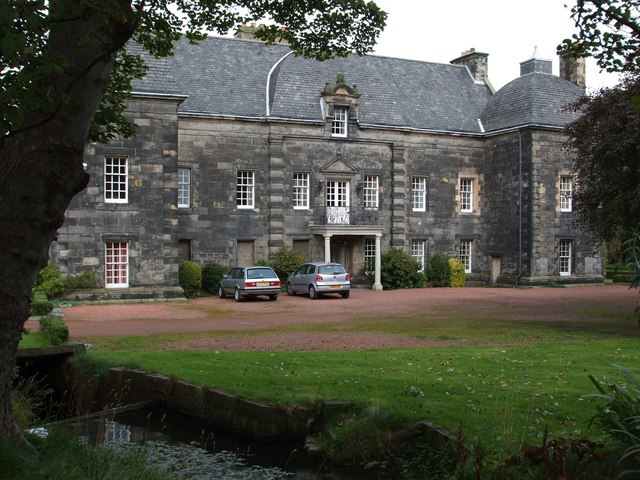
- South front of Caroline Park

- Location of Caroline Park in Edinburgh
- 55.9819°N 3.2397°W

Listed Building – Category A
- Designated: 14 July 1966
- Reference no.: LB28040

Caroline Park is a 17th-century mansion in the Granton area of Edinburgh. It was constructed between 1683 and 1696 for Sir George Mackenzie, 1st Viscount Tarbat, and his wife Anna. It is protected as a category A listed building for its "sophisticated French-influenced principal (south) elevation and some very fine intact internal features".

== History ==
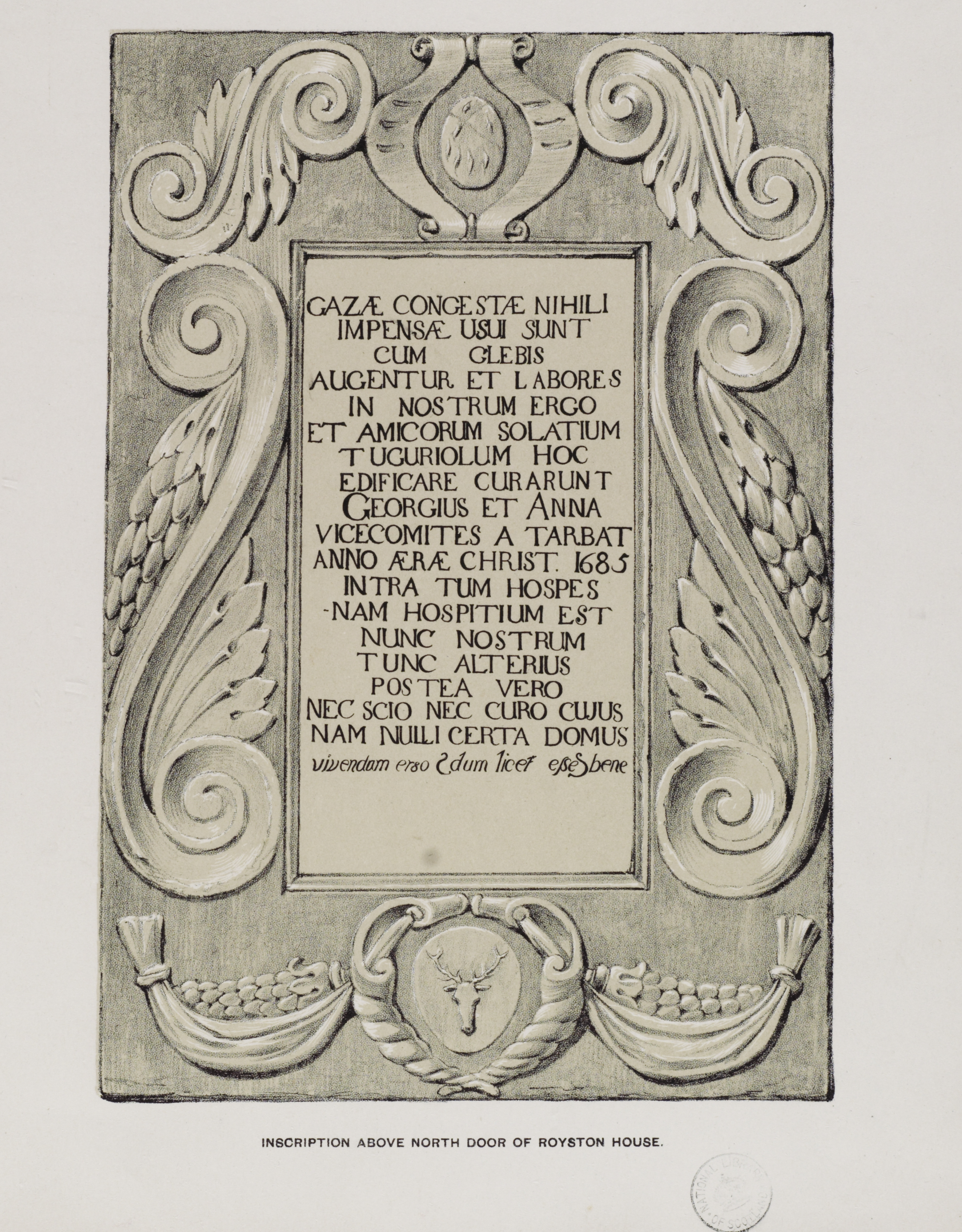
Copy of the inscription from above the north door to Royston House

Around 1585, Andrew Logan built a mansion on the site, known as Royston House, it was an L-plan building. Between 1683 and 1696 the house was completely rebuilt by Sir George Mackenzie on a quadrangular plan. In 1739 John Campbell, 2nd Duke of Argyll, purchased the house and renamed it Caroline Park after his daughter. He commissioned William Adam to design an extension, which was built in 1740–1741. By 1793 it had been inherited by Henry Scott, 3rd Duke of Buccleuch. In the 19th century it was leased to tenants including Henry Cockburn and Alicia Scott, composer of the tune Annie Laurie.

After undergoing various changes throughout the centuries, during the 1980s the building fell into a state of disrepair having been surrounded by developments since the Industrial Revolution. After years of independent renovation work, the house and its modest grounds have been returned to close to their former state, and are once again in domestic use. The privately owned house features Italian plaster-work and painted ceilings, intricate wrought iron balustrades, wooden panels and carvings.
