= Granton Waterfront regeneration =

Redevelopment in Edinburgh, Scotland

Coordinates: 55°58′50″N 3°14′20″W

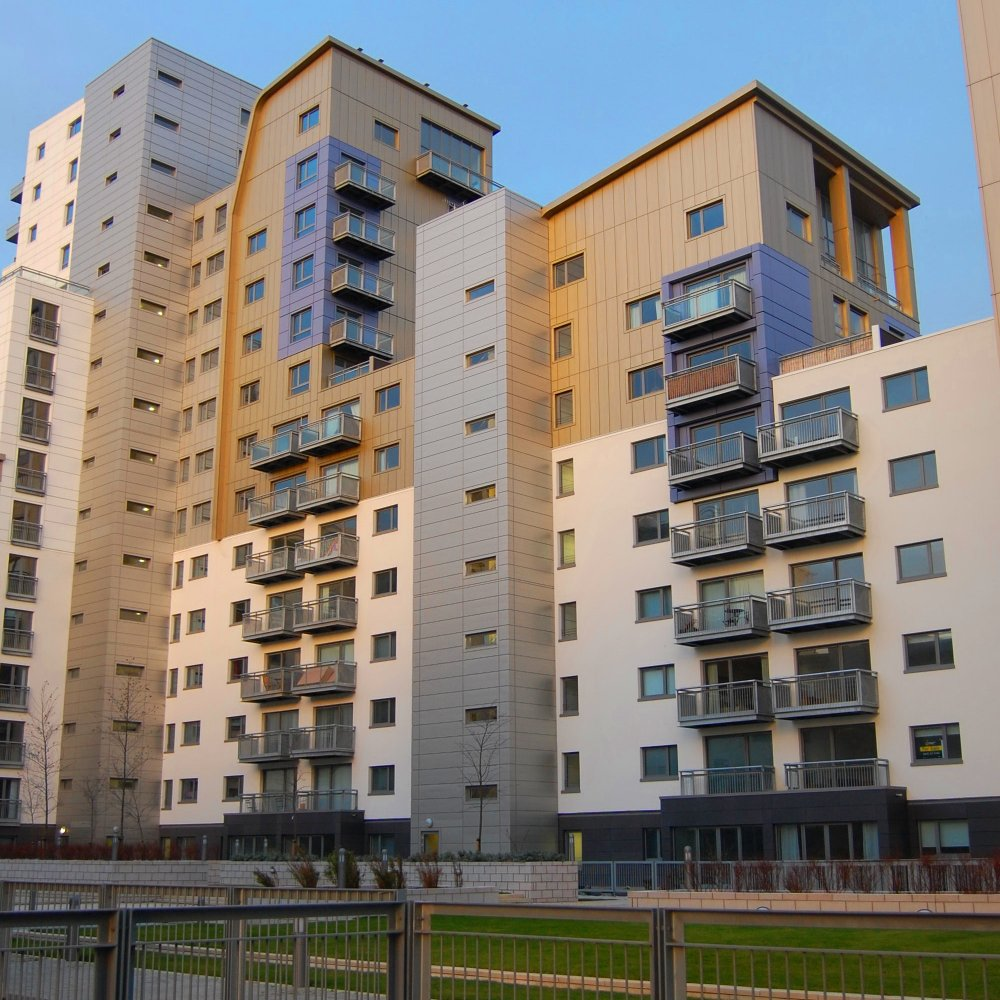
New apartment buildings in the Edinburgh Waterfront area on a site that formerly housed port-related industries

The Granton Waterfront regeneration is a redevelopment of parts of Edinburgh along the shores of the Firth of Forth in Granton. There are three main landowners: Arcus (formerly Forth Ports), National Grid plc and City of Edinburgh Council. Since the area was masterplanned in the early 2000s it has undergone significant change with approximately 1,400 new homes in the Granton area, new food retail stores, the new Telford College at Granton, and approximately 16,000 square metres (170,000 sq ft) of commercial office space.

A new road, Waterfront Avenue, has been constructed at Granton along with a 110 acres (45 ha) public park as part of National Grid's Forthquarter development.

Following the recession of 2008, a new Area Development Framework has been prepared by the planning authority reflecting a flexible approach to future development.

A new waterside promenade has started which will link the river Almond at Cramond to the Esk at Joppa allowing access to 18 kilometres of walkway/cycleway.
