= Granton Lighthouse =

Former Northern Lighthouse Board depot in Granton, Edinburgh

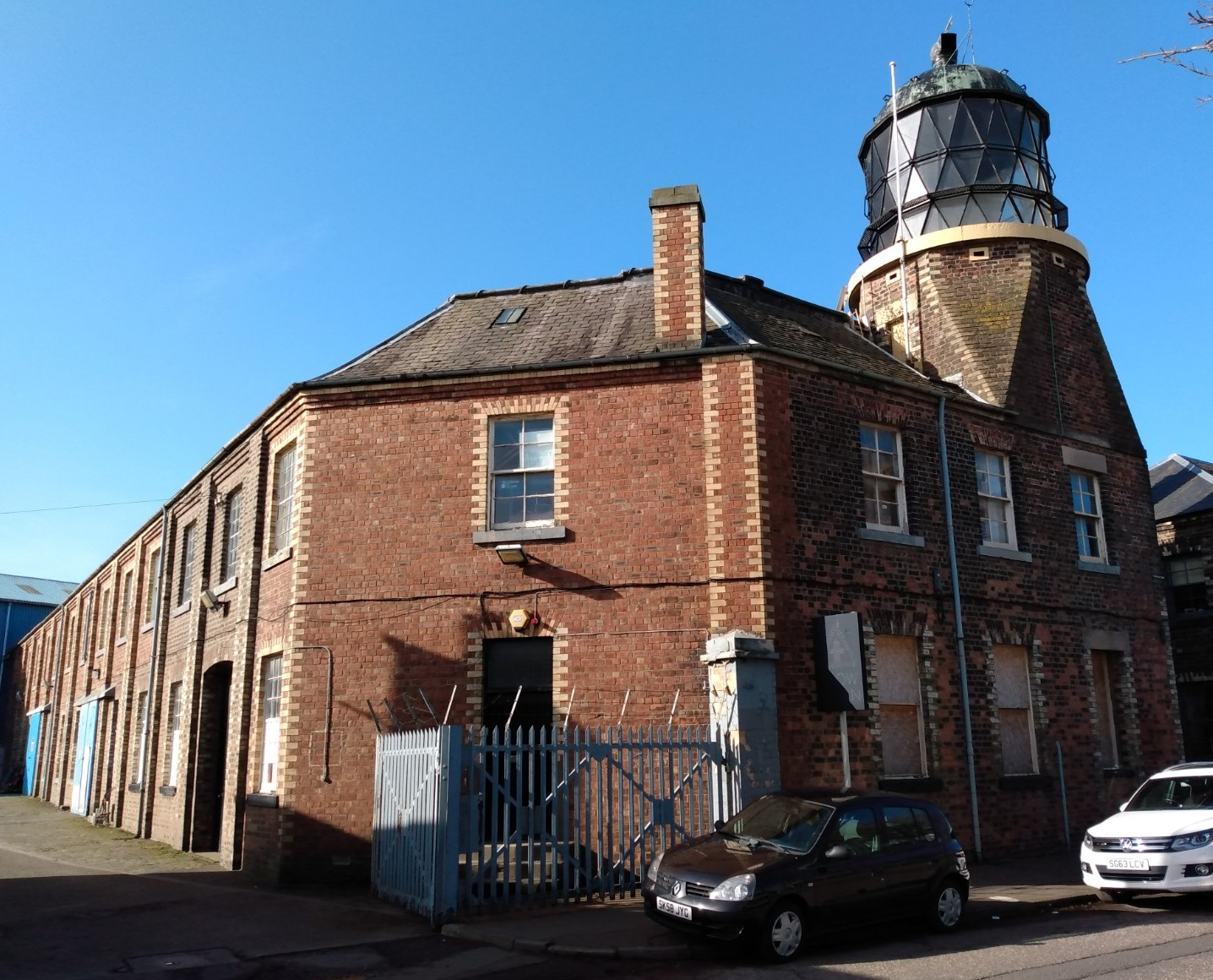
- Granton Lighthouse in March 2022.
- Interactive map of the Granton Lighthouse area

General information
- Location: 22 West Harbour Road, Granton, Edinburgh, Scotland
- Coordinates: 55.981741°N 3.229132°W
- Grid reference: NT2340477211
- Opened: 1860s
- Client: Northern Lighthouse Board
- Owner: City of Edinburgh Council

Listed Building – Category C(S)
- Official name: 22 West Harbour Road, Northern Lighthouse Board Engineering, Storage and Testing Facility, including Outhouses
- Designated: 20 February 1985
- Reference no.: LB29925

Granton Lighthouse is a former depot on West Harbour Road in Granton, Edinburgh, Scotland, now used as business accommodation. Originally known as the Northern Lighthouse Board Engineering, Storage and Testing Facility, it was formerly used by the Northern Lighthouse Board to store and distribute supplies, test and service equipment, and train employees.

== History ==
=== Operational history ===
The land on which the depot was built was leased from Walter Montagu Douglas Scott, 5th Duke of Buccleuch in 1852. The depot was constructed for the Northern Lighthouse Board in the 1860s. It is a two-storey, 15-bay warehouse crowned by a low corner tower topped by a lighthouse lantern cupola, built in red brick with yellow brick angle dressings. It has several outbuildings including a former smithy.

The depot was used to store equipment for the Northern Lighthouse Board's lighthouses. From 1874 until the early 1970s, the lighthouse tender NLV Pharos was berthed in the adjacent Granton Harbour and used to transport supplies from the depot to the Northern Lighthouse Board's lighthouses around the country and to transport "empty casks, boxes, paint cans, oil cans, medicine bottles, matting, etc" back to the depot. The facilities on the site included "an administration office, warehouse and workshops". Equipment such as buoys was transported to the depot for servicing. Patterns for casting were stored at the depot for suppliers to examine.

The lighthouse tower was never an operational lighthouse; rather, it was used to test lamps and equipment. In 1869, the engineer John Richardson Wigham was invited to demonstrate an experimental gas lighting technique at the depot. In 1892, a coal gasworks was constructed at the depot to produce the fuel for the Northern Lighthouse Board's beacons and light buoys; it was removed in the 1930s after the coal gas was replaced by acetylene. In 1907, a railway siding and overhead crane were added. During the Second World War, one of the glass panes of the lighthouse's lantern purportedly sustained a bullet hole from a Luftwaffe machine gun.

The depot was granted category 'C' listed status by Historic Scotland in 1985. In 1998, the neighbouring former keeper's cottage at 20 West Harbour Road was also 'C' listed. The Northern Lighthouse Board continued to use the depot until November 2001, when it relocated its operations to Oban.

=== Later history ===
After the Northern Lighthouse Board ceased to use the depot, it was subsequently converted into business space, including a recording studio. Proposals to redevelop the site into a hotel and conference centre did not proceed.

On 29 September 2025, the National Transport Trust installed a "Red Wheel" plaque on the building.

In March 2026, the City of Edinburgh Council assembled a £4.171 million package of funding for a comprehensive refurbishment of the building, made up of £2.278 million from the Scottish Government's Regeneration Capital Grant Fund; £0.758 million from Historic Environment Scotland; £0.852 million from the National Lottery Heritage Fund; and £0.283 million from the Council itself. Following the restoration, the building is intended to be managed by the Out of the Blue Arts and Education Trust under a 75-year lease.
