= Granton, Edinburgh =

Edinburgh suburb

Coordinates: 55.976°N 3.229°W

Granton
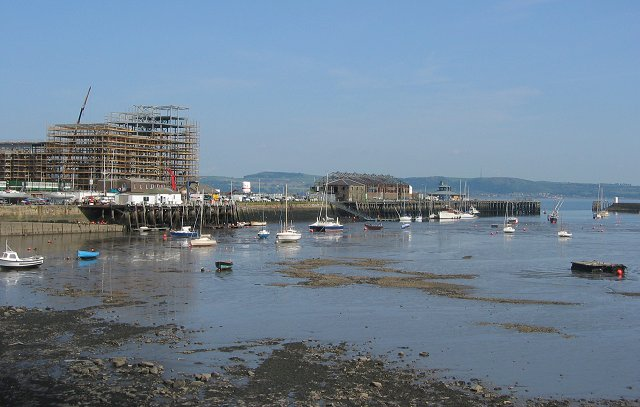
- Granton Harbour

- Location within the City of Edinburgh council area Location within Scotland
- Language: English
- OS grid reference: NT2377
- Civil parish: Edinburgh
- Council area: City of Edinburgh
- Lieutenancy area: Edinburgh
- Country: Scotland
- Sovereign state: United Kingdom
- Post town: Edinburgh
- Postcode district: EH5
- Dialling code: 0131
- Police: Scotland
- Fire: Scottish
- Ambulance: Scottish
- UK Parliament: Edinburgh North and Leith
- Scottish Parliament: Edinburgh Northern and Leith

Granton is a district in the north of Edinburgh, Scotland. Granton forms part of Edinburgh's waterfront along the Firth of Forth and is, historically, an industrial area having a large harbour. Granton is part of Edinburgh's large scale waterfront regeneration programme.

== Name ==
According to Stuart Harris, the name is derived from the Anglian grand tun, a farm or place of or at the gravel or sand. It is recorded from 1478 onward, with the division into Easter Granton and Wester Granton appearing from before 1612.

The name appears on maps in the seventeenth century relating to the now-demolished Granton Castle. The name also appears in Granton Burn, which now runs through Caroline Park down to what was Granton Beach.

== Granton Castle ==
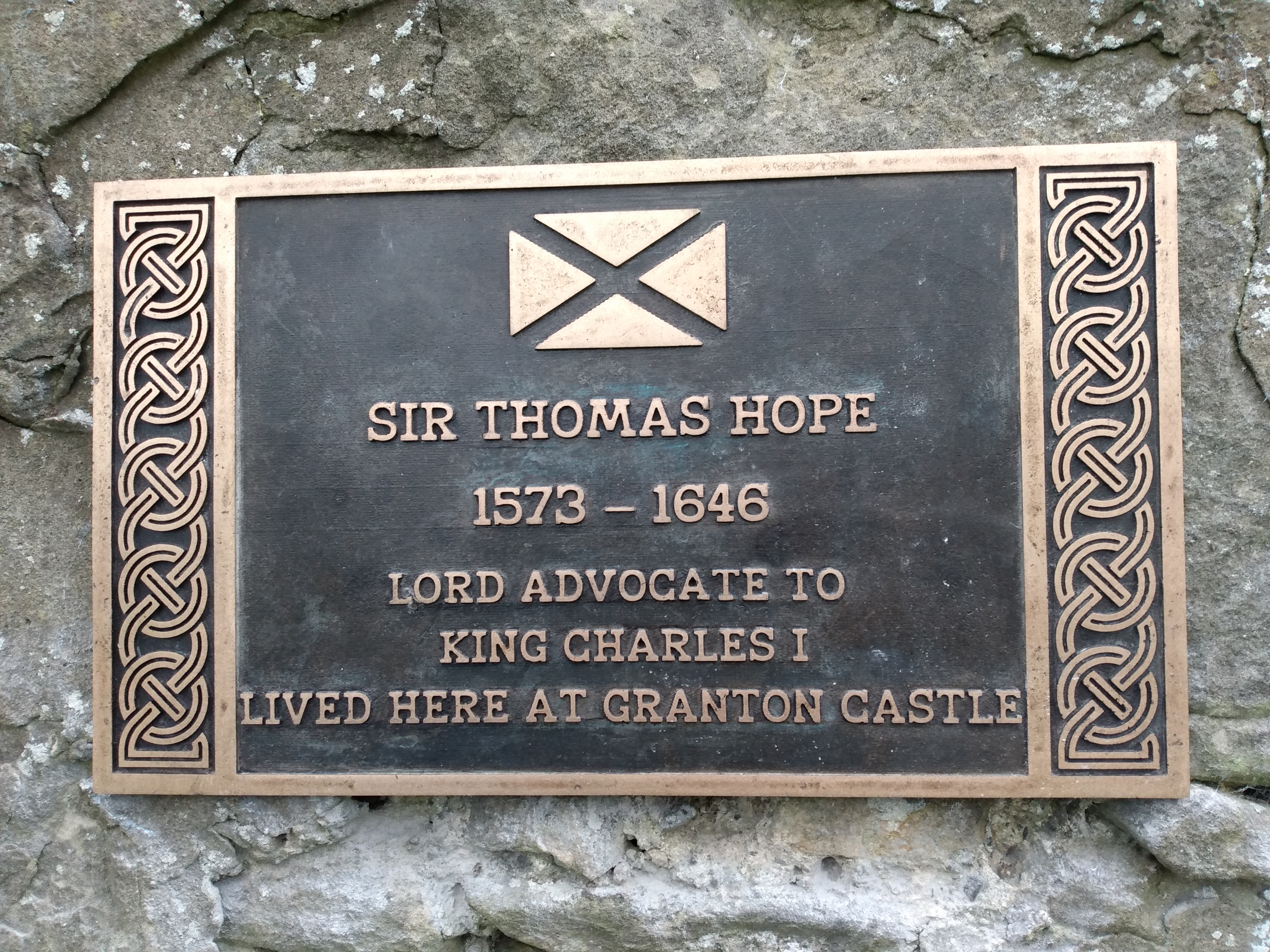
A plaque marking the former home of Sir Thomas Hope, 1st Baronet at Granton Castle.

Granton Castle is first documented in 1479, as a building owned by John Melville of Carnbee, Fife. It stood to the north-west of the current mansion, Caroline Park. On John's death it passed to his son, also John Melville, who was one of the many Scottish nobility killed at the Battle of Flodden. In 1592 it was sold by the Melville family to John Russell but by 1619 was acquired by Sir Thomas Hope, the Lord Advocate, who greatly altered and extended the castle. On his death it passed to his son, Sir John Hope, Lord Craighall.

The building fell derelict by the 18th century. At the end of the 19th century the architectural historians MacGibbon and Ross did a survey and created scale drawings of the remnants. This showed a standard L-plan Scottish tower house with a courtyard to the north side. This was accessed by a gateway on the west side, on the outer side of which was a loupin stane, a set of steps to aid a person to mount a horse.

In 1928 a quarrying firm, Bain and Brown, bought the site to excavate the rock outcrop beneath the castle. The majority of the castle was lost due to this exercise. The exercise itself was largely redundant as the steeply angled rock bed quickly meant excavation became too deep to be economic. Now only small fragments of the castle remain.

The walled garden of the castle survives. For many years it was the home of a small scale commercial market garden. It was threatened by housing development proposals but was saved by a local campaign and is now maintained as a community resource by the Friends of Granton Castle Garden.

== Granton Harbour ==
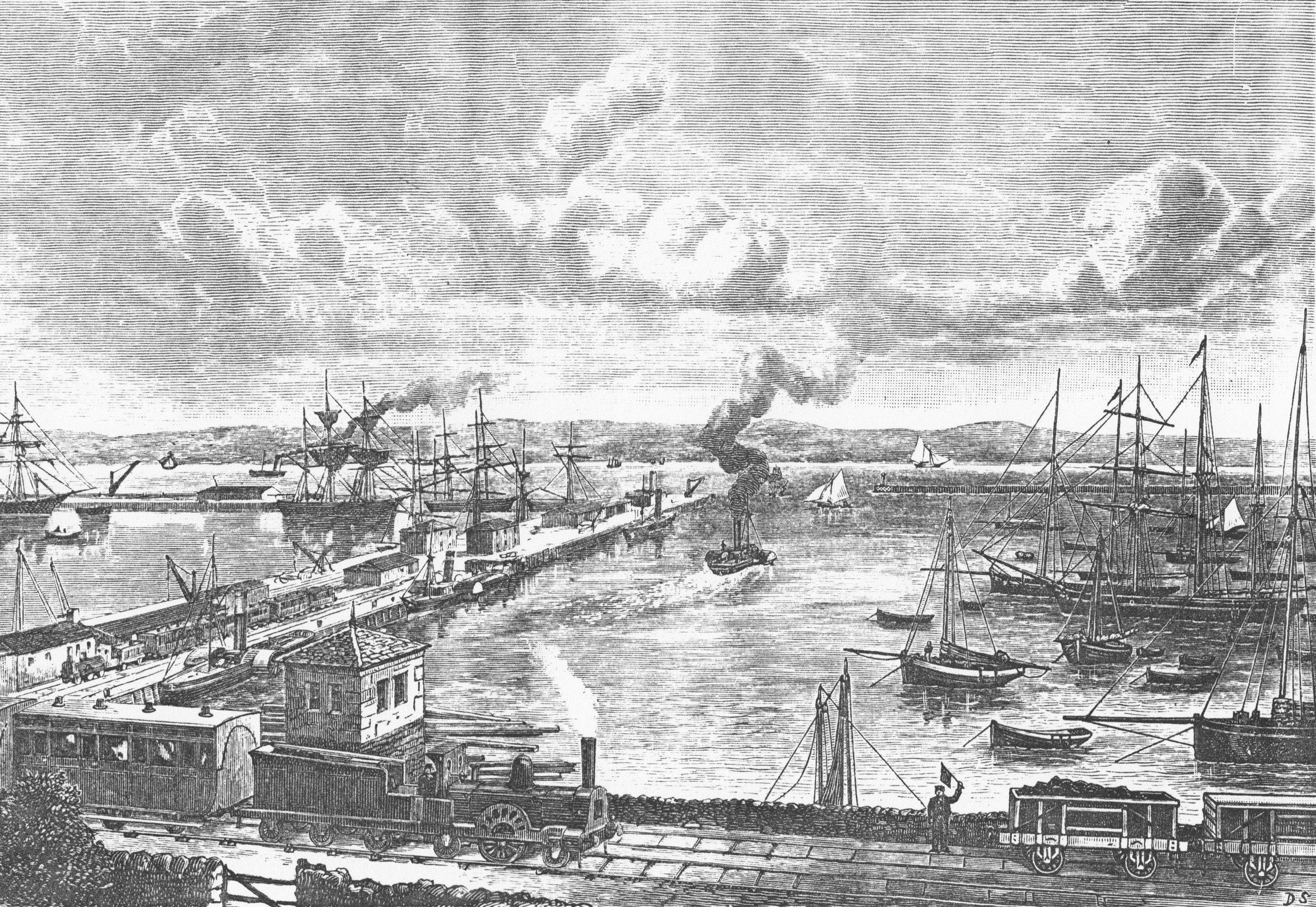
Granton Harbour in its heyday, around the 1860s

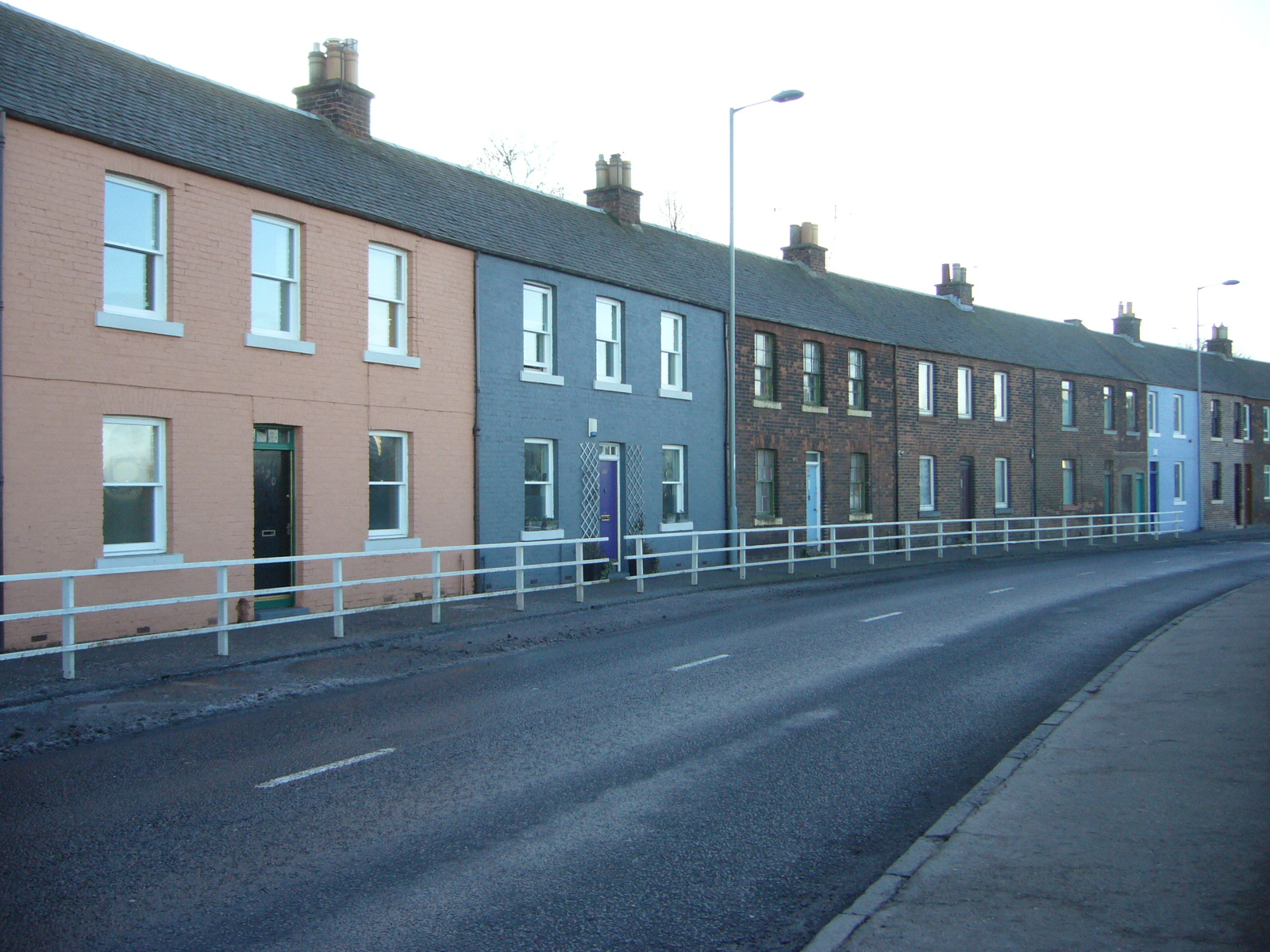
Houses in Lower Granton Road

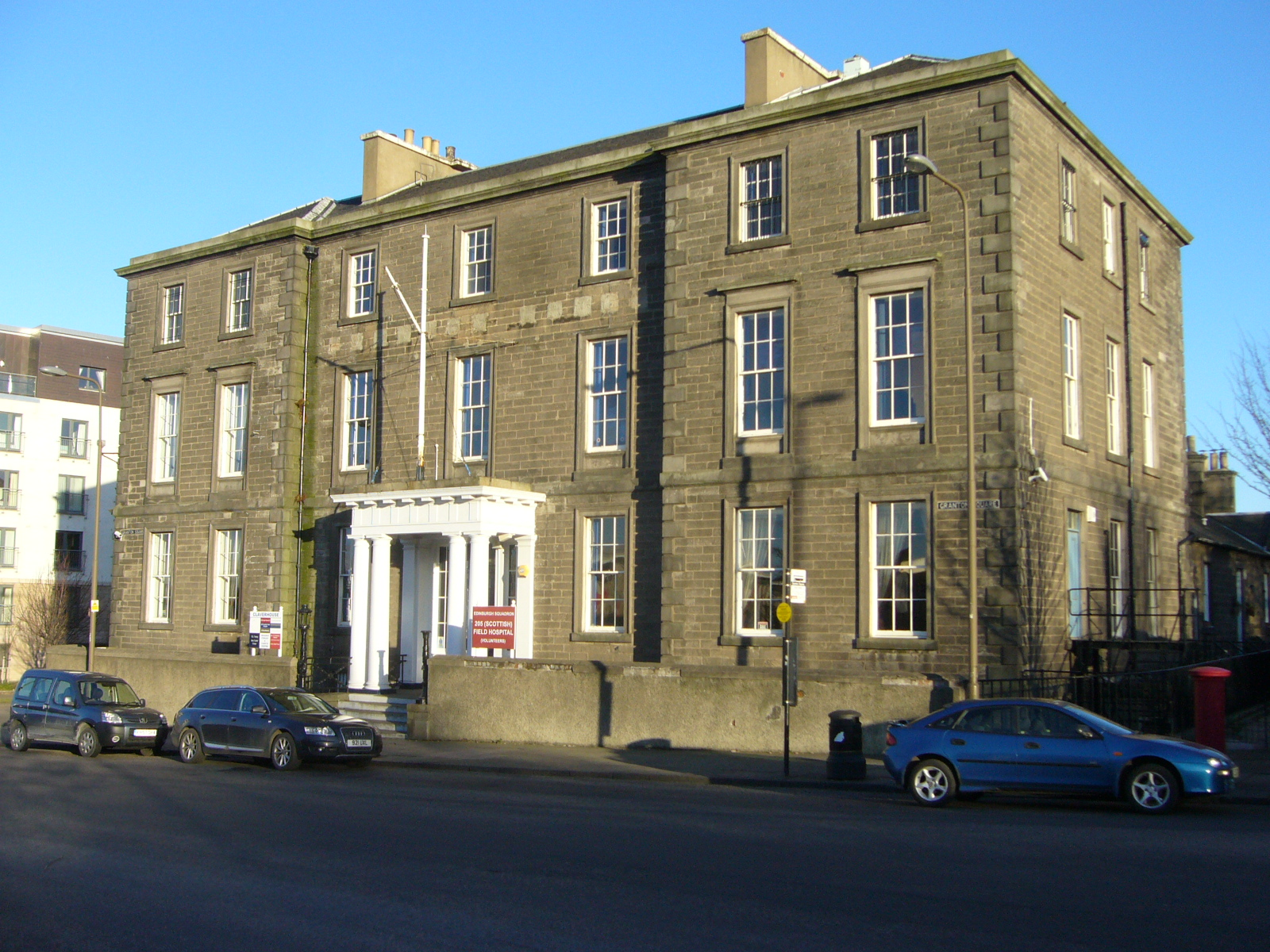
Former HMS Claverhouse, Granton Square

In 1834 Edinburgh debated the need for a larger harbour. James Walker in his capacity as President of the Institution of Civil Engineers oversaw a committee, also including Admiral David Milne, to choose between three options: an extension to the existing Leith Docks; a new harbour at Trinity or a new harbour at Granton. The initial bid for Trinity did not receive parliamentary consent and in 1836 a second bill promoting Granton was agreed. The Granton Pier Act 1837 (7 Will. 4 & 1 Vict. c. xv) received royal assent on 21 April 1837.

Construction began in June 1837 and the initial central pier was opened on 28 June 1838, coinciding with the coronation of Queen Victoria. The entire project was funded by the 5th Duke of Buccleuch. The original project included a central pier named the Victoria Jetty and a road running eastwards to Leith. The young Queen Victoria landed at the pier on RY Royal George on 1 September 1842 on her first official visit to Edinburgh as queen. In 1843/44 the pier was extended in length to a total of 1700 feet (around 500m) this stage being completed in October 1844. By 1845 an "exceedingly low" cost steamboat service used to run between Stirling and Granton.

Lighthouse engineer Robert Stevenson oversaw the later construction of the outer breakwaters, which were completed in 1863. Thereafter the Resident Engineer was John Howkins, followed by his son, also John Howkins. The original concept to create two large wet docks on the landward side was abandoned as this proved impractical.

Granton became a successful port for the export of coal, and import of esparto grass for making paper. The fishing fleet grew considerably, leading to the development of an ice house in the late 19th century, to the west of the harbour. There were some 80 fishing trawlers resident just before World War II. The first example of the fossil crustacean Waterstonella was found in the Granton shrimp beds by the keeper of geology at the Royal Scottish Museum, Dr. Charles Waterstone. The foreshore area between Granton and Newhaven is a designated Site of Special Scientific Interest (SSSI) aimed at encouraging and preserving the resource of fossils in the area.

From 3 February 1850, the world's first ferry-train began operating between Granton and Burntisland, Fife. The paddle-steamer Leviathan carried the trains, which formed the main link across the Forth until completion of the Forth Bridge in 1890. Passenger and car ferry services continued into the 1960s.

In 1884, John Murray set up the Marine Laboratory in Granton, the first of its kind in the United Kingdom. In 1894, this laboratory was moved to Millport, Isle of Cumbrae, on the Firth of Clyde, and became the University Marine Biological Station, Millport, the forerunner of today's Scottish Association for Marine Science at Dunstaffnage, near Oban, Argyll and Bute.

During the First World War Granton harbour was used as the base for mine-sweeping equipment: mainly Scottish trawlers and their crews, called into active service and conscripted as part of the Royal Navy Reserve. During this period the harbour was officially renamed as "HMS Gunner" when referred to in military documents, in reference to the name of the largest trawler in its fleet. The harbour was then home to mine-sweepers, decoy ships (Q-ships), and anti-submarine vessels. The north section held smaller support vessels specifically built for Navy use, including 24 motor launches, 18 paddle mine-sweepers, and 30 boom-defence vessels, with a total of 103 craft.

Granton Depot was the key base in Scotland of the Northern Lighthouse Board with their boats taking lighthouse keepers and their supplies to and from lighthouses around the coast of Scotland. Granton also became the base for pilots from 1920, guiding ships into the Firth of Forth, a service it still provides a base for today.

From 1942 to 1946, Granton harbour was home of shore-based minesweeping training establishment HMS Lochinvar. As the scale of the harbour restricted ship size, it became a site for scrapping former Royal Navy ships, including HMS Newport and HMS Hedingham Castle.

Today two boat clubs jointly run the Edinburgh Marina: the Forth Corinthian Yacht Club and the Royal Forth Yacht Club.

== Fishing ==
The Annual Reports of the Fishery Board for Scotland provide an insight into fishing in Granton and Newhaven in the years before the First World War. The specific circumstances have to be taken into account. The report from 1902 states that "there were 44 steamers fisning from Newhaven, all of which were engaged in trawling". In the report for 1909, we learn that "at Granton about 70 trawl vessels land their catches, about two thirds of which are carted to and sold in Newhaven, the remainder being railed directly to Glasgow".. The Second Edition Six-Inch Ordnance Survey Map illustrates the harbours and their railway connections at the time. It it was not until 1910 that the Board decided to include steam trawlers as first class vessels, and their crews in their statistics for fishermen - hence the abrupt differences to be seen in the charts below from then on. Similar differences can be observed in the results for Dundee and Aberdeen.

From 1901 to 1909 the Fishery Board chose to group the results for Newhaven and Granton together. For reasons of continuity, all the other results have been added together in a similar way to produce the charts below. In order to gain further detail, only the local results are shown in the entry for Newhaven.

At the start of 1914 up to seventy one vessels were trawling all through the North Sea, but their movments were restricted after the outbreak of war. Although twenty seven of the trawlers were employed by the Admiralty during the concluding five months of the year, good results were obtained.

Fishery Statistics

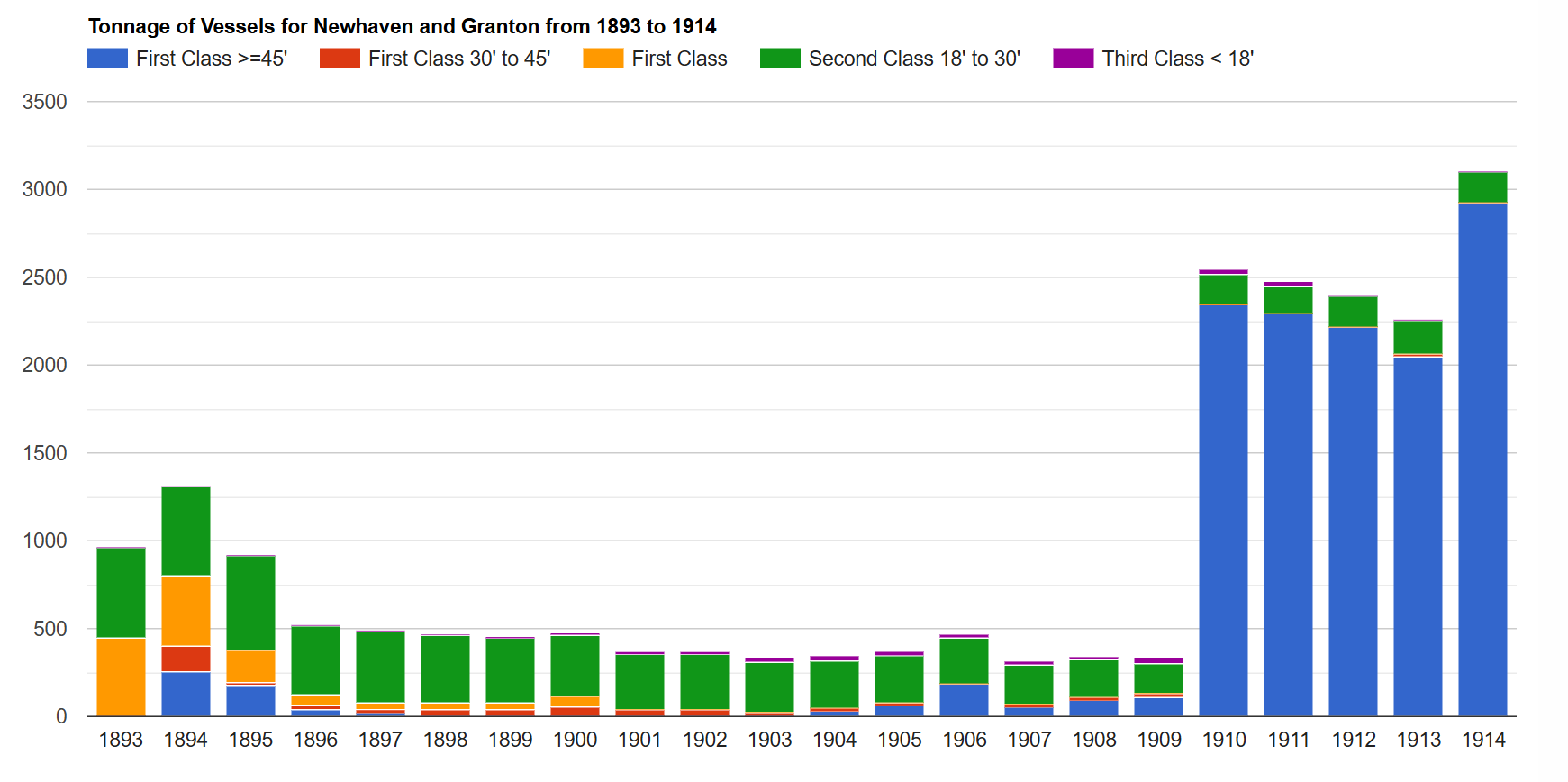
Tonnage of vessels

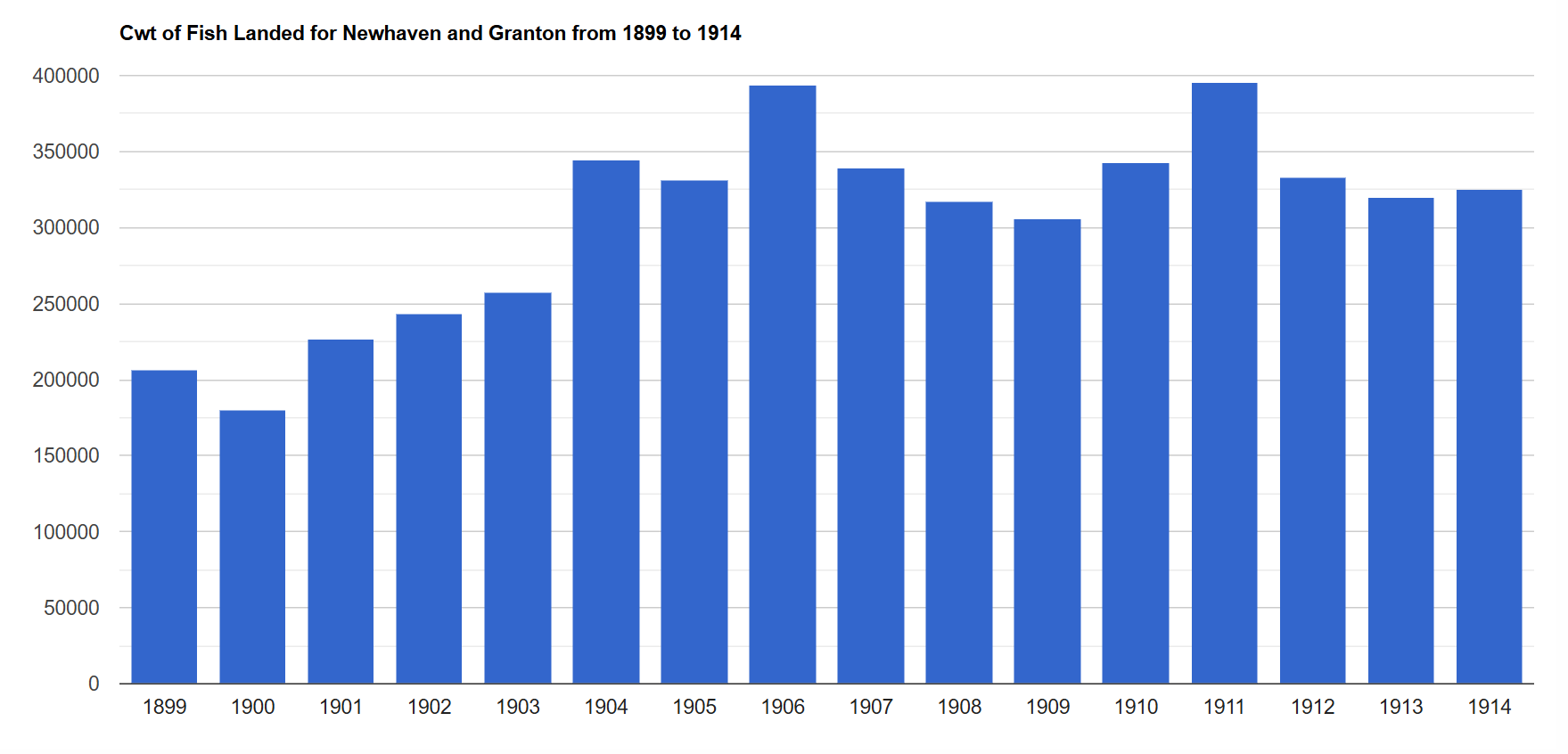
Cwt of fish landed

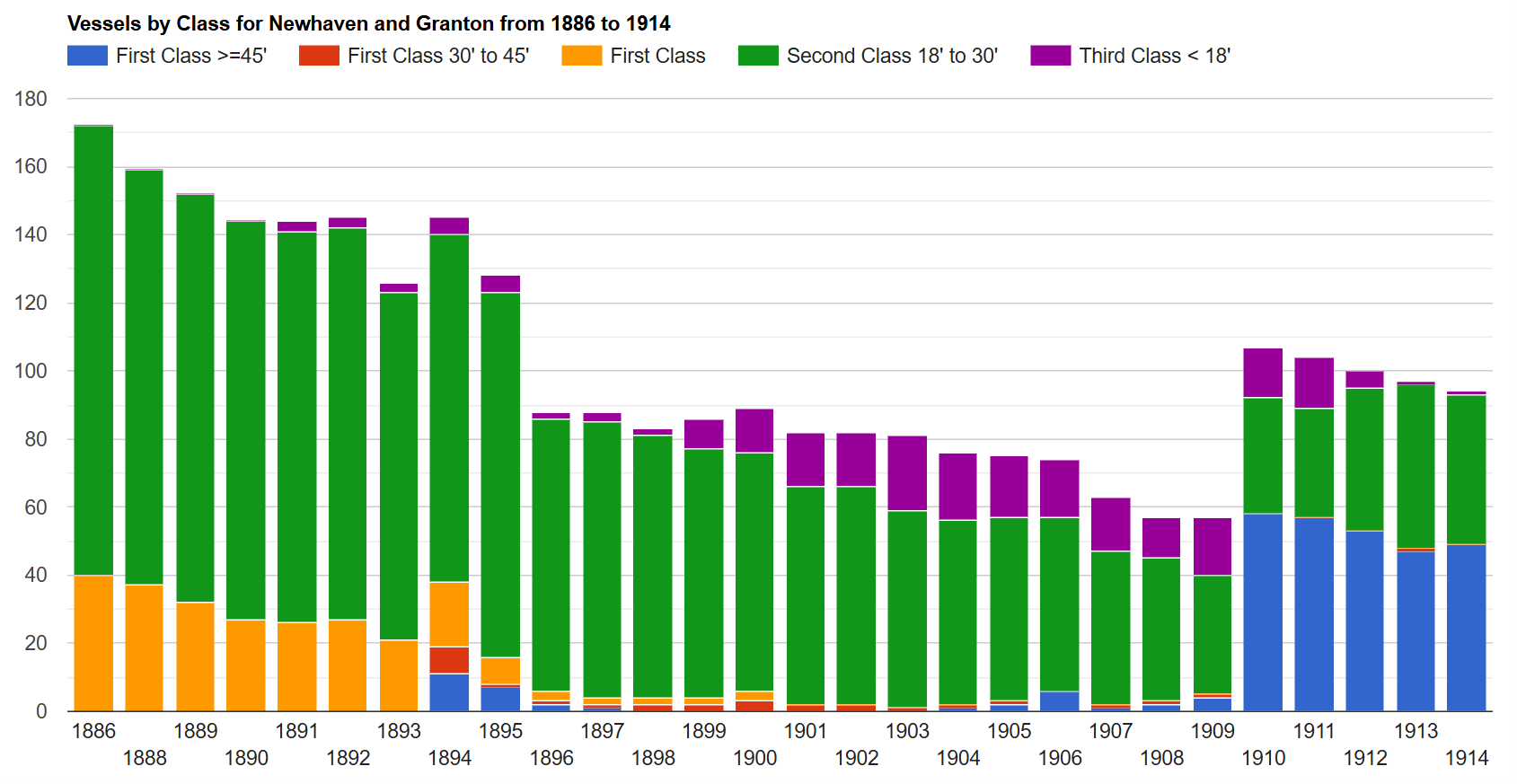
Vessels by class

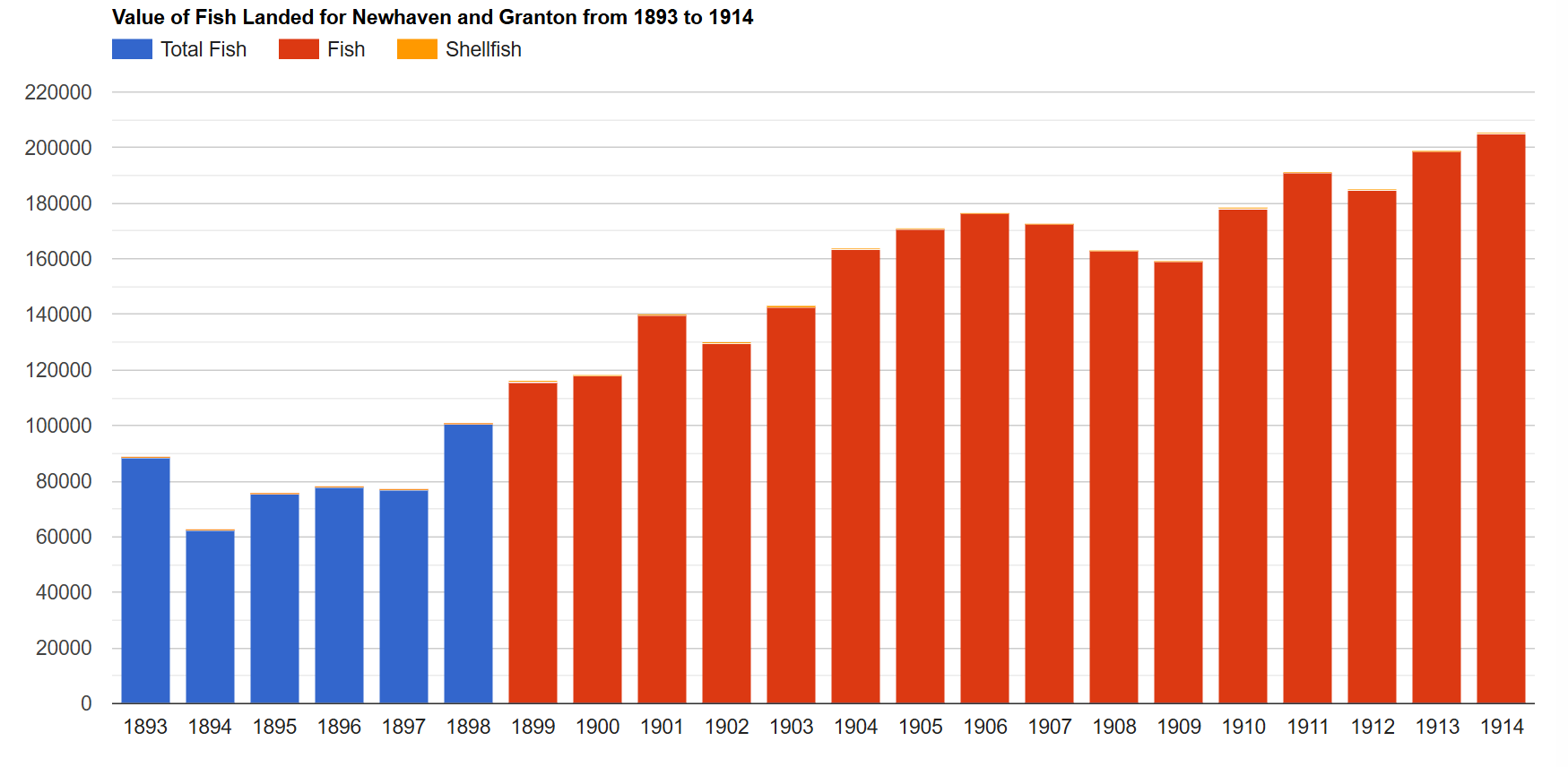
Value (£) of fish landed

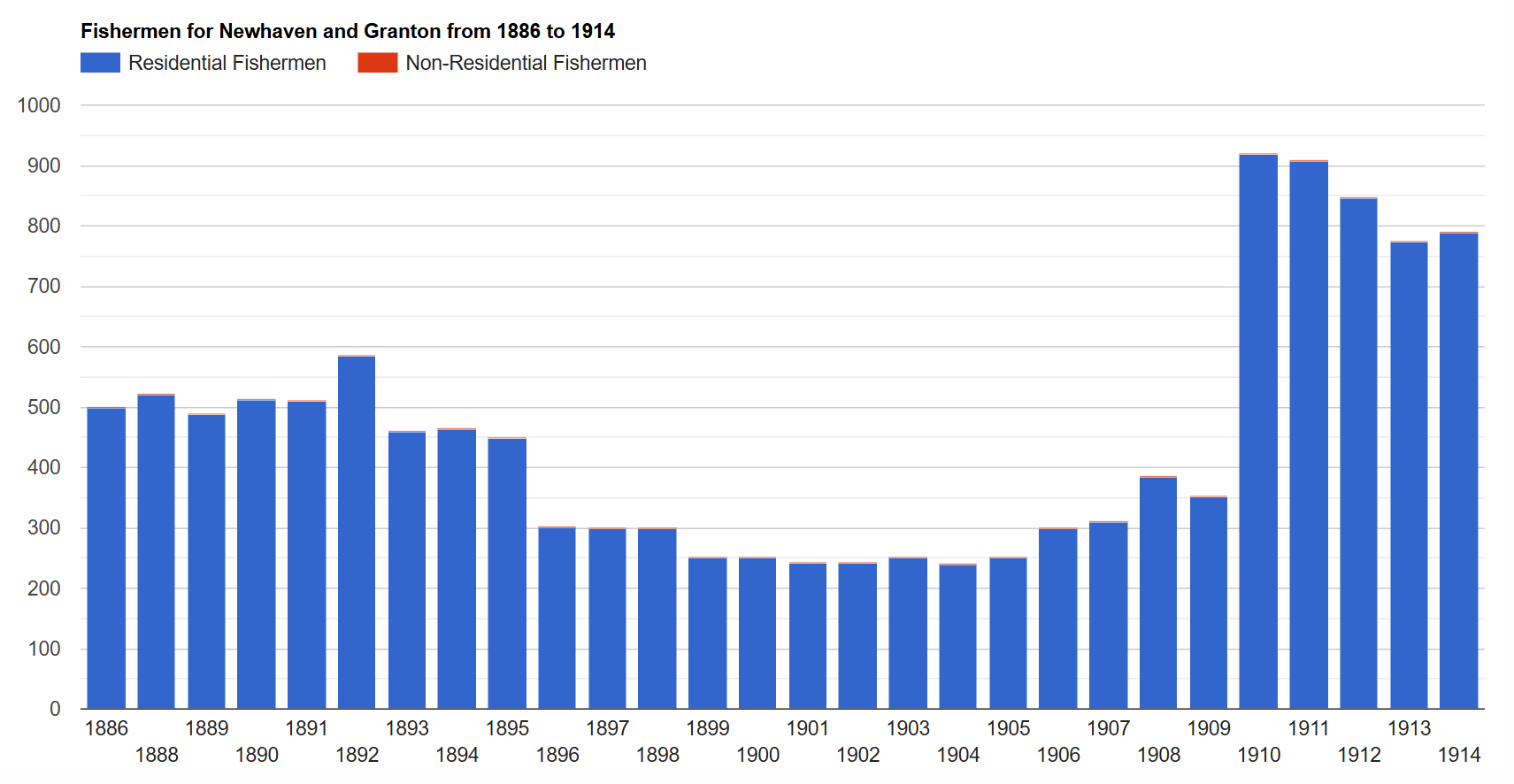
Fishermen

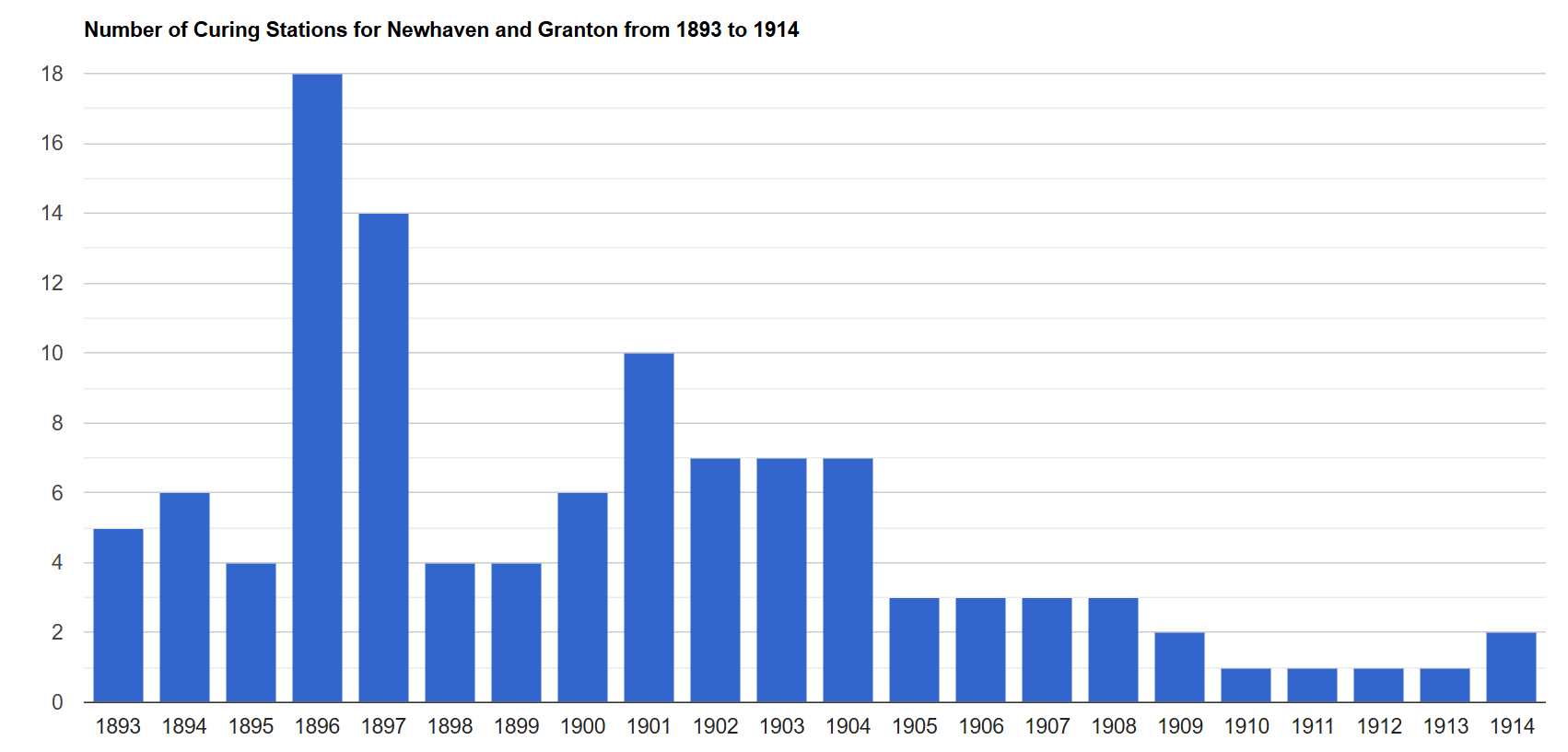
Number of curing stations

== Industry ==
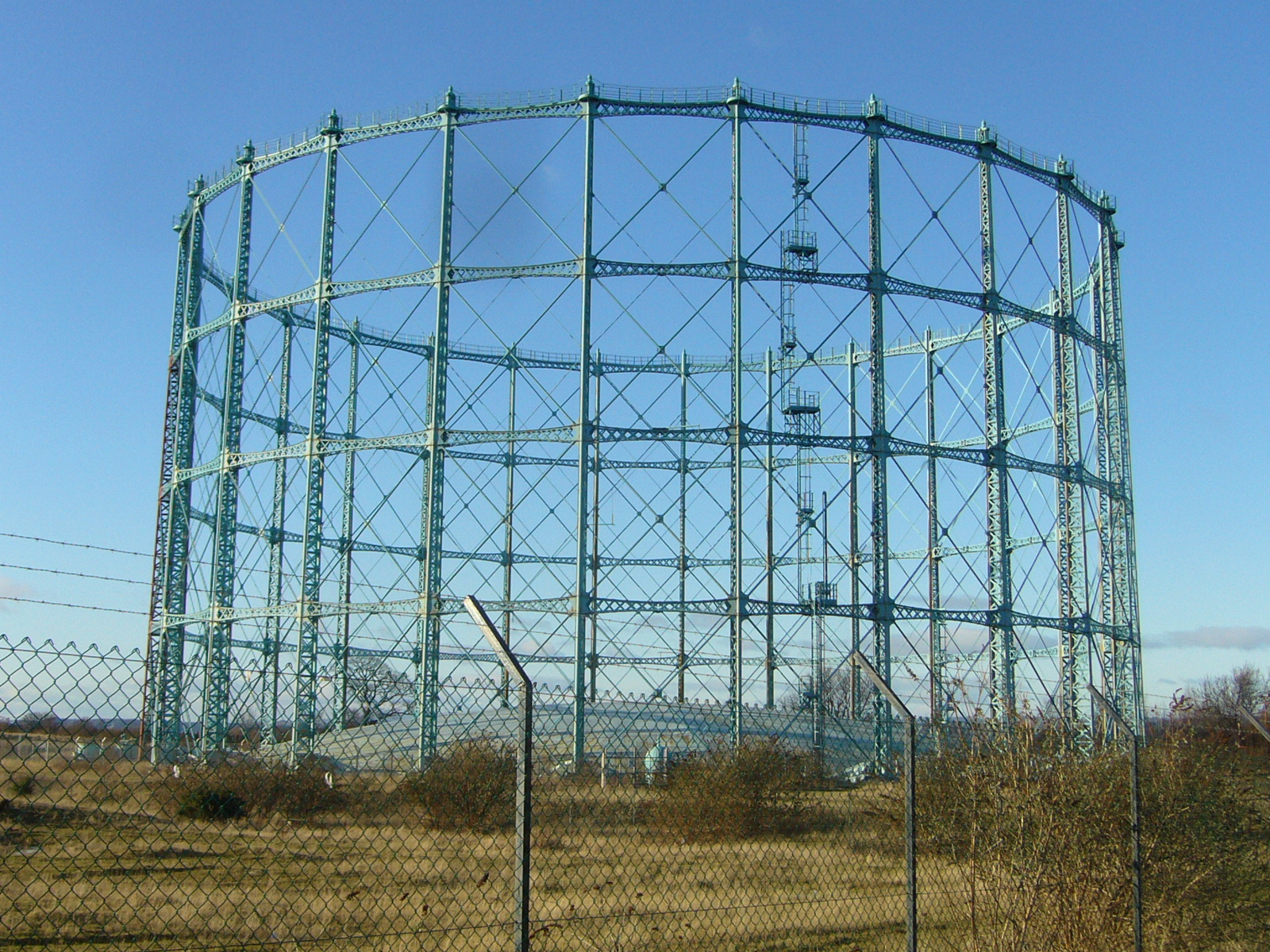
Preserved gasholder of the Granton Gasworks

Granton quarry to the west of the harbour was initially developed to provide stone to build the harbour. Later it provided stone for parts of Holyrood Palace, and for the statue of Lord Nelson on Nelson's Column in Trafalgar Square, London.

The oldest surviving car factory building in Britain is located in Granton. The Madelvic Motor Carriage Company works were built in 1898 for the manufacture of electric cars. Like the gasometers, the factory is also a listed building. However, approval has been granted for its demolition as part of wider redevelopment of the area. In June 2017, planning permission was granted for a community garden on the site. In November 2021, a Red Wheel plaque was unveiled at the site. Red Wheel plaques are installed by the National Transport Trust to identify sites of significant transport heritage.

Granton Gasworks were formerly one of Edinburgh waterfront's most prominent landmarks, comprising three blue gasometers which were clearly visible from Fife. Two of the structures, built in the 1930s and 1970s, have now been demolished. The third structure remains, and is listed as an example of Victorian industrial architecture. In 2023, the inner 'bell' of the surviving gasholder was removed, leaving the listed frame to be part of the regenerated waterfront. In 2025, the gasholder was opened to the public as a public park.

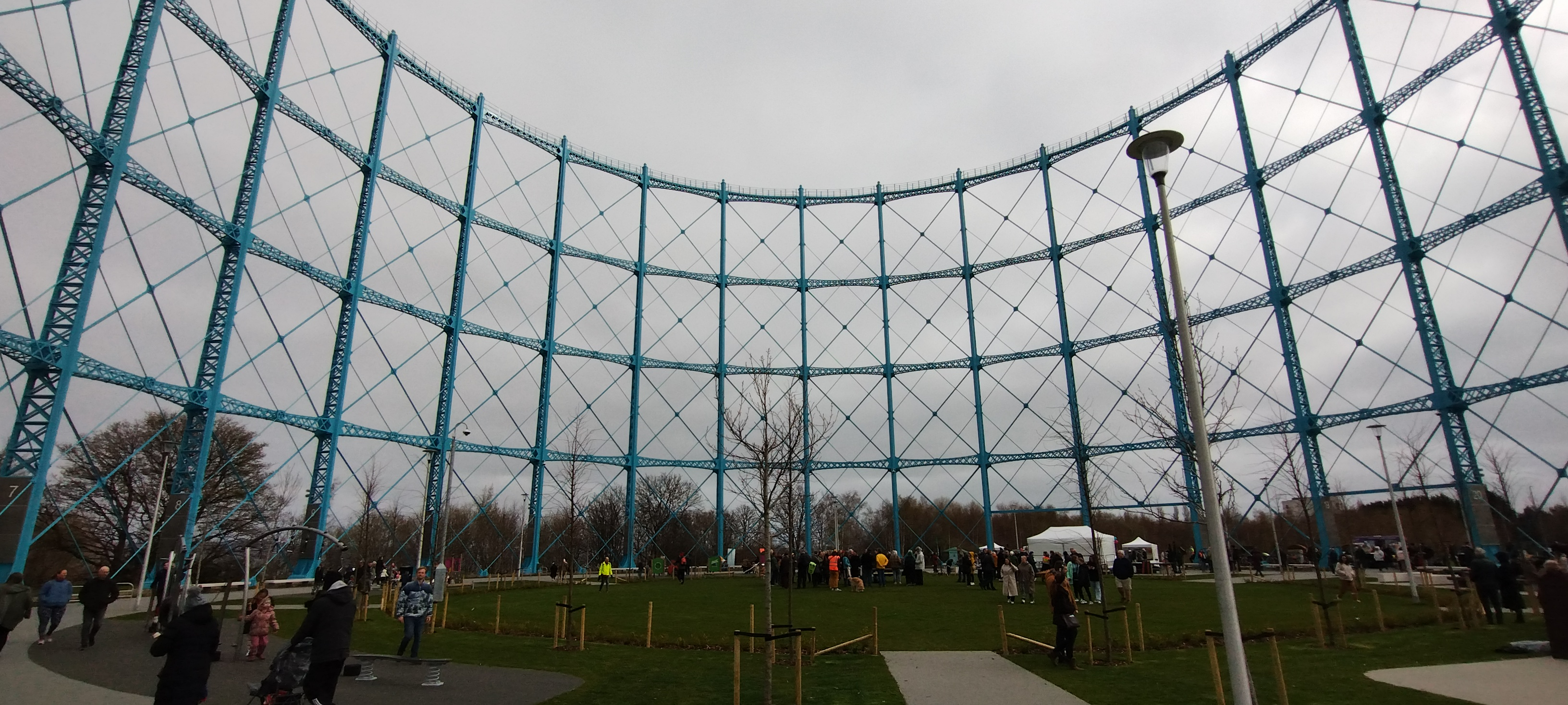
Opening of a public park created within the surviving gasholder.

Development during World War Two included the construction of the works of Bruce Peebles (later Parsons Peebles), that made high voltage electrical equipment, including transformers for electricity power stations. The works burnt down in a huge fire in 1999, and is now part of the waterside redevelopment. The firm continues in business as Parsons Peebles Generation Limited, Wood Road, Royal Dockyard, Rosyth. Ferranti's factory on Ferry Road was built to make electronics for aircraft, including gyro-based gunsights for the Supermarine Spitfire. Today the site of the former Ferranti's is still under a defense contractor Leonardo.

== Transport ==
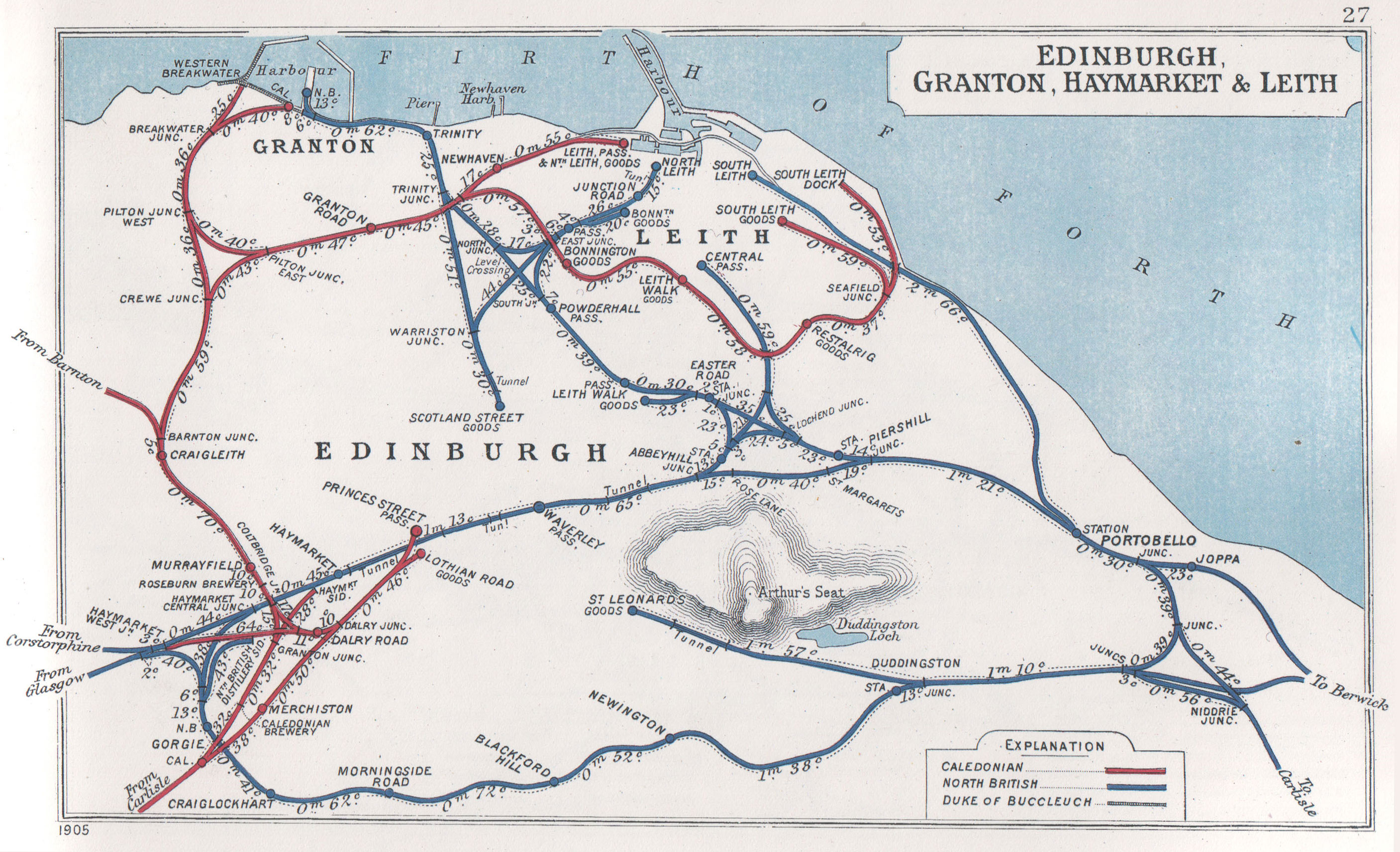
Railways of Edinburgh, Granton, Leith and Haymarket in 1905

=== Buses ===
Bus services are mainly provided by Lothian Buses. Buses that Terminate in Granton either stop at Granton Square or the Scottish Gas HQ, the Scottish Gas HQ journeys will have West Granton, Pilton or Muirhouse as their destination blinds.

8 Muirhouse - Granton - Pilton - Canonmills - North Bridge - Newington - Moredun - Royal Infirmary

14 Muirhouse - Granton - Pilton - Ferry Road - Elm Row - North Bridge - Newington - Prestonfield - Niddrie

16 Colinton - Oxgangs - Morningside - Tollcross - Princes Street - Leith - Newhaven - Granton - Muirhouse - Silverknowes

19 Granton - Pilton - Western General - West End - Princes Street - Meadowbank - Lochend - Portobello

24 West Granton - Muirhouse - Drylaw - Western General - Stockbridge - West End - The Meadows - Blackford - Royal Infirmary

32 Granton - Muirhouse - Davidson Mains - Drum Brae - Sighthill - Wester Hailes

38 West Granton - Western General - Craigleith - Ravelston - Murrayfield - Gorgie - Morningside - Blackford - Kings Building - Royal Infirmary

47/X37 Granton - Western General - West End - Lothian Road (47) Princes Street (X37) - Newington - Liberton - Straiton - Penicuik Ladywood (47) Penicuik Deanburn (X37)

N16 Torphin - Colinton - Oxgangs - Morningside - Tollcross - Princes Street - Leith - Newhaven - Granton - Muirhouse - Silverknowes

=== Railways ===
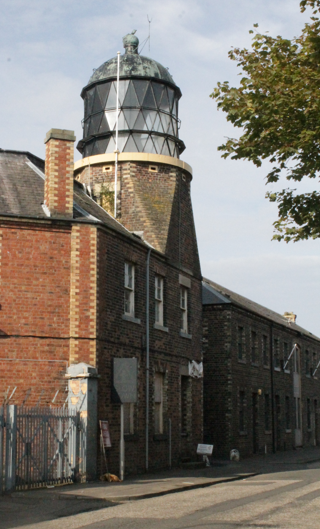
Granton Lighthouse

A railway connection to the harbour was needed in order for it to make a profit. The Duke of Buccleuch, who had financed the harbour, invested in the Edinburgh, Leith and Newhaven Railway, which in 1842 opened a line from Canal Street railway station, at right angles to the present Waverley station, to Trinity Crescent, near the Trinity Chain Pier. The line was extended in 1838 to Granton harbour. The junction in Edinburgh was too steep to be operated by locomotive, and so trains had to be worked by rope. By 1868, a new line was built from Waverley station through Abbeyhill to Bonnington which ended rope working.

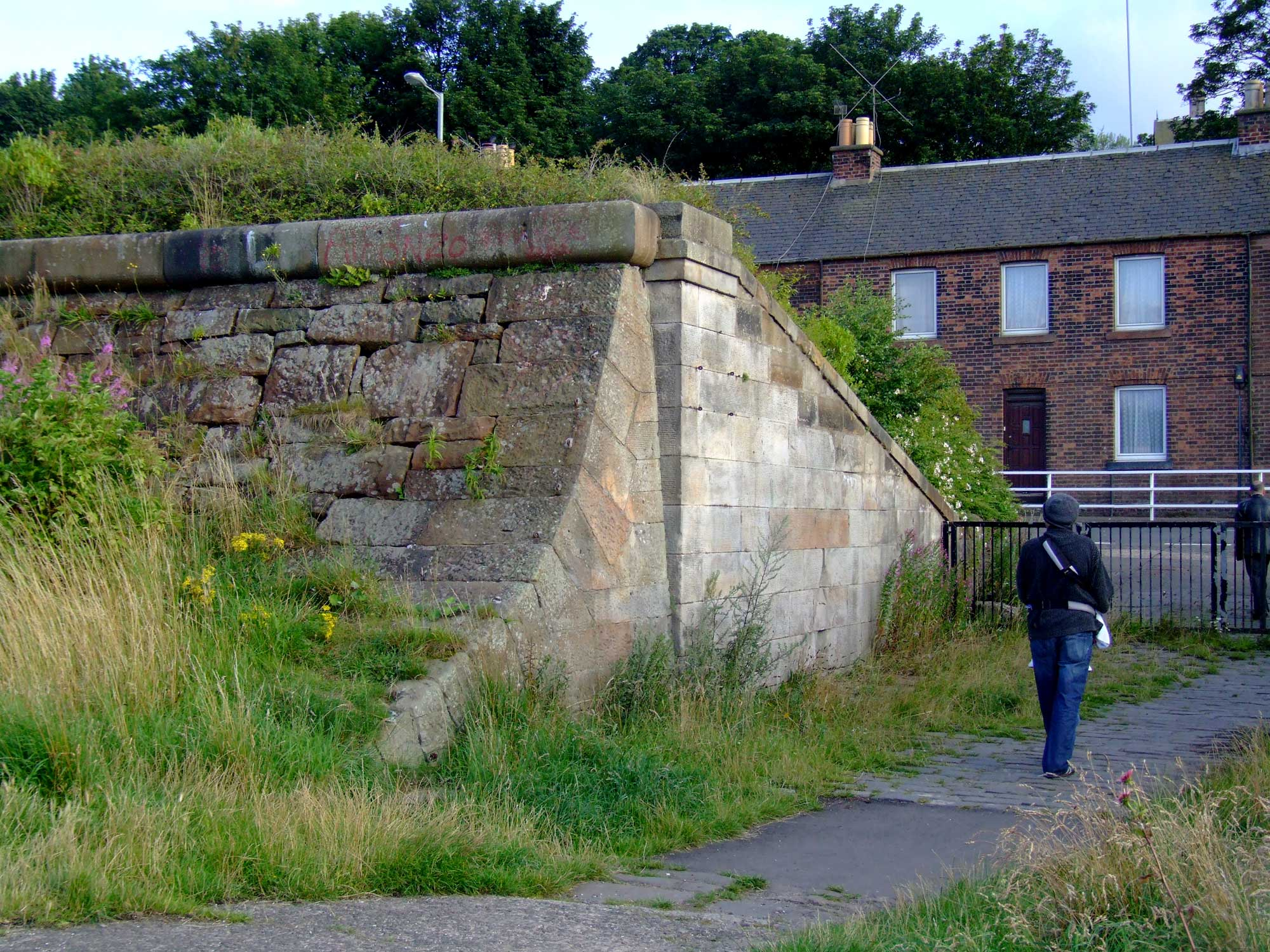
The remains of the Edinburgh, Leith and Newhaven Railway embankment at Granton in 2009

From 1846-1890, Burntisland railway station was part of the main East Coast railway line to Perth, Dundee and Aberdeen. In 1890 when the Forth Bridge opened, the long distance trains started using it and after that the line to Granton was just used by local passenger and goods trains. Passenger trains ran until 1926, when the tram and omnibus services became fully integrated. Goods services ran until 1986, when the lines were lifted.

In 1861, the Caledonian Railway opened a line to Granton from Dalry, providing a goods service to Granton harbour. They agreed a contract to run passenger services to the new gas works from central Edinburgh; the Granton Gasworks railway station was built for this purpose. In 1864, the Caledonian built a line to Leith, with stations at Newhaven Road (near Trinity Academy), Granton Road, East Pilton, Craigleith, Murrayfield and Dalry Road running to Edinburgh Princes Street. One of the two connections between the Caledonian and the North British networks was on Granton Square. Passenger trains ran until 1962, and goods trains until 1968, when the lines were removed.

The railway embankment, which separated Lower Granton Road from the Forth, was removed in the early 1990s.

=== Trams ===
In 1909, Leith Corporation ran trams from Leith to Granton. They were joined in 1923 by trams from the Edinburgh Corporation, resulting at one point, having seven tram routes to the area: four from Leith via Lower Granton Road (services 2, 14, 16 and 17); three via Granton Road (services 8, 9 and 13). Trams to Granton were withdrawn in stages, from 1952 to 1956, and replaced by buses.

In 2001, Granton was proposed as a station on Edinburgh's planned modern tram network. It would be constructed as part of Phase 1b which would turn the single line built during Phase 1a into a continuous loop. In April 2009, the City of Edinburgh Council announced the cancellation of Phase 1b citing problems caused by the 2008 financial crisis, saving an estimated £75,000,000.

In February 2024, the council announced a 12-week consultation on proposals to build a new north-south tram route that would link Granton with the city centre and the BioQuarter. The northern part of the route would roughly follow the original Phase 1b route between Granton and Roseburn, but without linking to Newhaven as originally planned. The proposals included running trams along the Roseburn Path, which is part of the National Cycle Network, but after representations from cycling and environmental groups, an alternative route via Orchard Brae and the Dean Bridge was to be included in the consultation. The consultation opened on 25 August 2025 and closed on 17 November.

== Inter War to Present ==
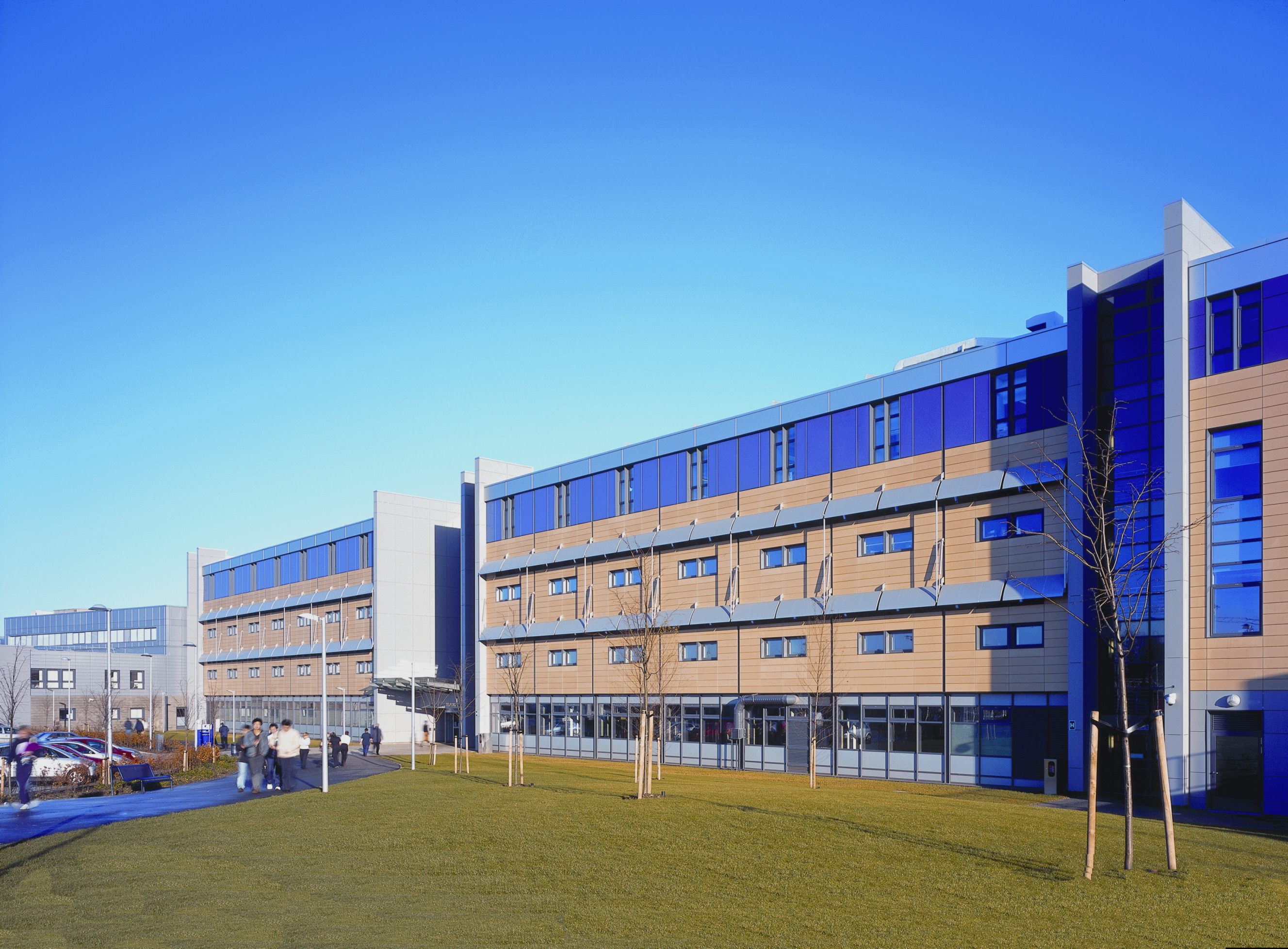
Edinburgh College (Granton Campus), West Granton

From 1932, the Council developed Granton as a major 150-acre (61-hectare) housing scheme. Over 1,700 residential units, mainly tenement flats, were built from east to west in three tranches, Granton, Wardieburn and Royston Mains. They were designed by City Architect Ebenezer MacRae and his team, including GC Robb who laid out the latter stages and designed feature terraces in Royston Mains. The majority of these properties are still in use.

Dr. Charles Munro had developed a general practice in the area, and when he was called up for national service in World War Two, his locum was pioneering German Dr. Ekkehard von Kuenssberg. Post-war Kuenssberg developed "The Care Trust" that integrated all local government services into one group, becoming one of the first cases of primary care in what was the newly launched National Health Service.

Much of West Granton housing was demolished from 1995 onwards.

The Edinburgh Waterfront scheme is bringing about the redevelopment of Leith and Granton. The gasworks site spread over 110 acres (0.45 km^{2}), is to be redeveloped as the ForthQuarter, a mixed-use development of housing, offices, local services, a park, and a new campus for Edinburgh College. The area was masterplanned by Foster and Partners, although the individual "plots" will be separately designed by other architects. As part of the redevelopment, the main storage building of the National Museums of Scotland opened in Granton in 1996. It does not serve a publicly accessible museum function. A new reception and conservation building was built at its entrance in 2005.

In 2024, the surviving gas holder was refurbished to become the centrepiece of the Waterfront redevelopment. The interior of the gas holder has been designated as the Granton Gas Holder Park. It includes a play area, space for permanent and temporary public art, a "relaxation area", exercise trails and space for markets and sporting events. The entire structure is illuminated.

== Demographics ==
Ethnicity	Granton (Forth Ward)	Edinburgh
White	84.6%	84.9%
Asian	7.1%	8.6%
Black	3.6%	2.1%
Mixed	2.0%	2.5%
Other	2.7%	1.9%

== Notable residents ==
- Henry Bellyse Baildon FRSE (1849–1907) poet and author
- James Hope of Hopetoun
- John Roxburgh, footballer
- The Exploited
