= John Howkins (civil engineer) =

Scottish harbour engineer (1839-1906)

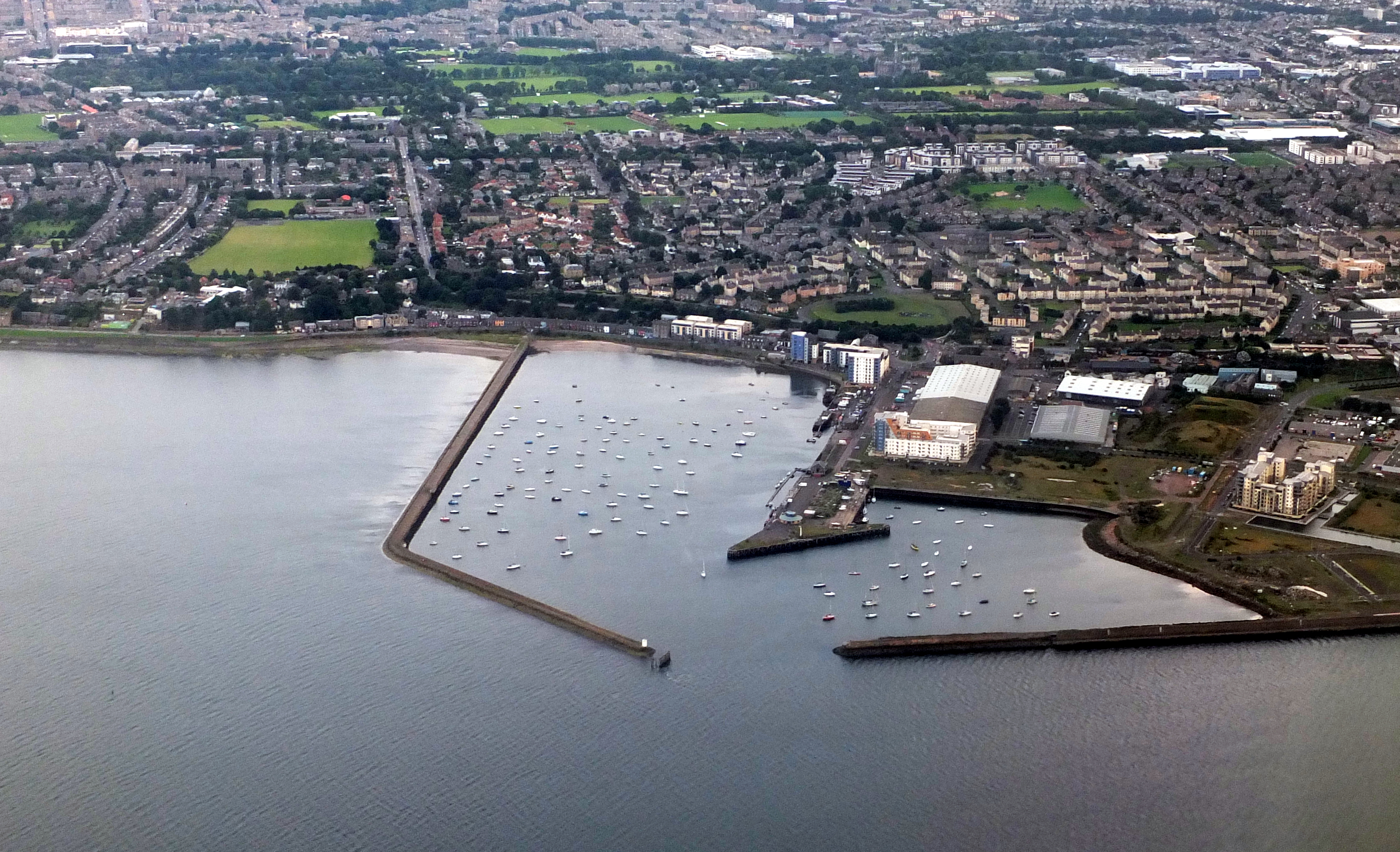
Edinburgh Granton harbour

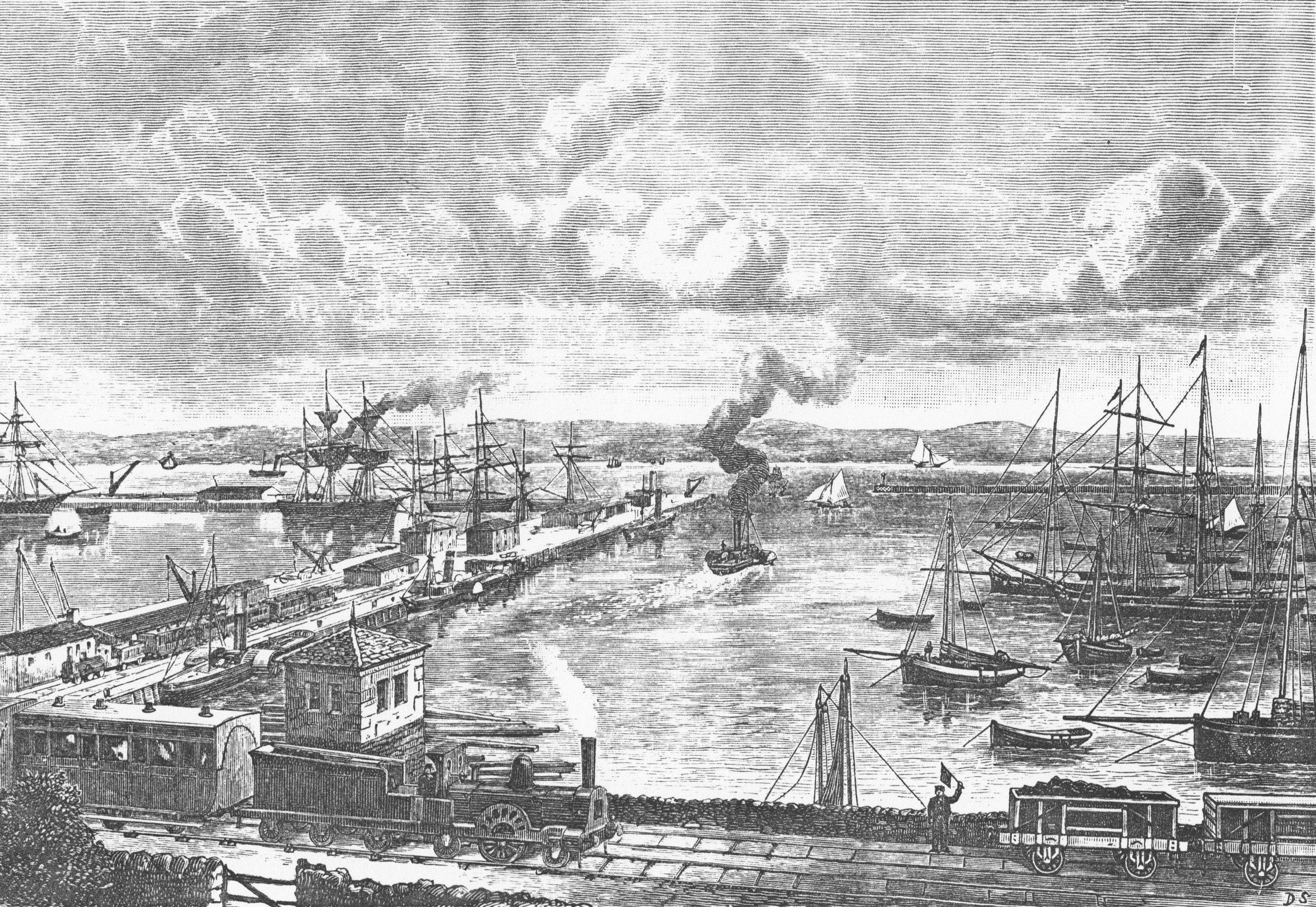
Granton Harbour in its heyday, around the 1860s

John Howkins MICE (1839–1906) was a Scottish harbour engineer closely associated with Granton, Edinburgh.

== Life ==
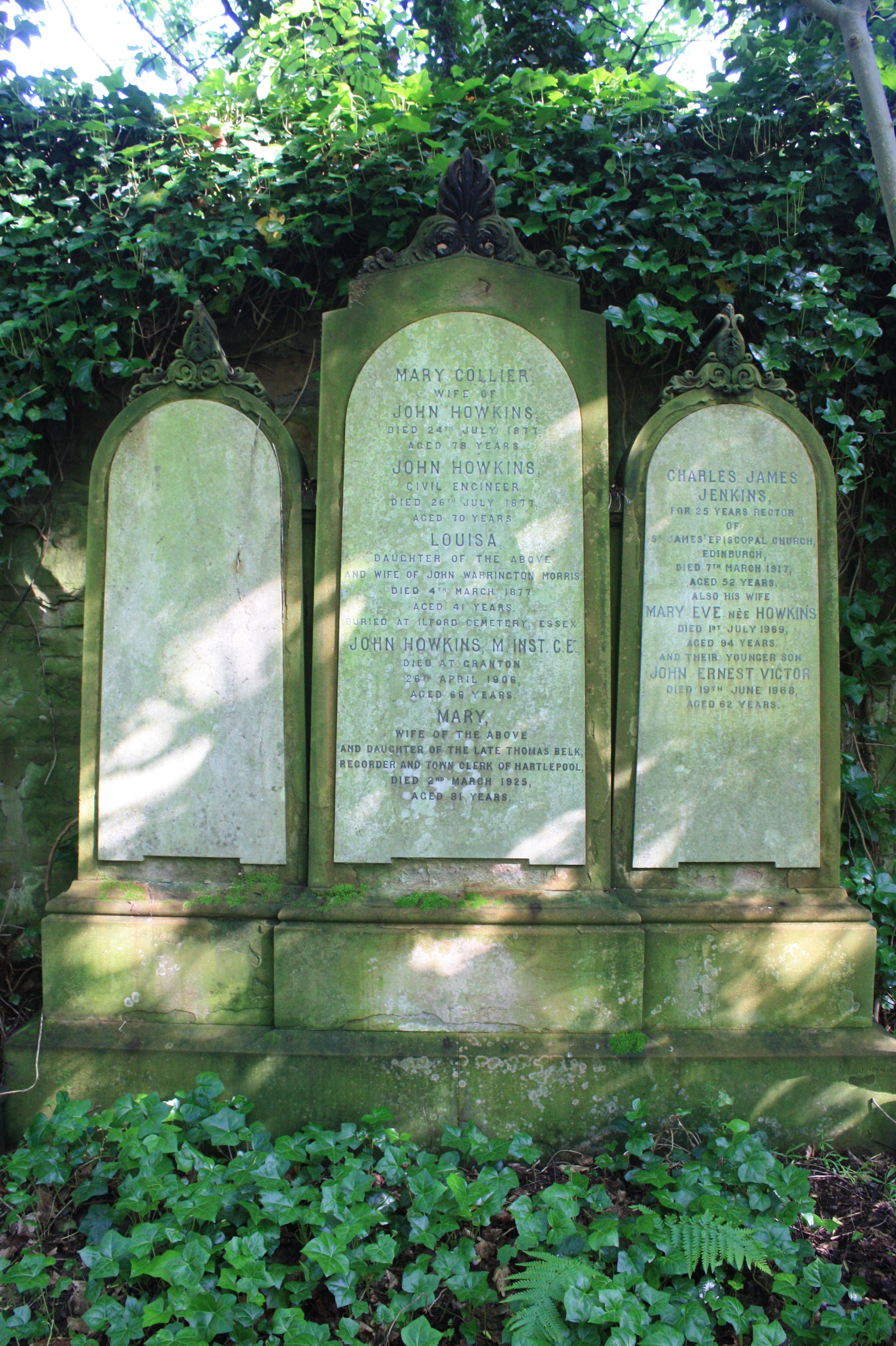
The grave of John Howkins, Warriston Cemetery

He was born in Granton, Edinburgh in September 1839 the son of John Howkins, civil engineer, (1807–1877) and his wife Mary Collier (1799–1877). He was educated in Edinburgh and apprenticed from 1853 to 1857 to James Leslie, helping him to oversee the repair of the west pier at the harbour of Methil in Fife. He then went to London working in the offices of McClean and Stileman in Westminster. In 1862 he was appointed Resident Engineer at Stranraer Harbour in the same year of its major expansion by creation of the Portpatrick Railway. Here he oversaw the construction of the new low-water steamboat pier serving the new ferry to Ireland. In 1863 he returned to England to oversee the new bridge being built at Weybridge. On the opening of the bridge in 1865 he transferred to the Furness and Midland Joint Railway and built the track section from Wennington to Carnforth.

In 1866 he moved to Barrow-in-Furness to complete the Devonshire Docks. In 1868 he returned briefly to Edinburgh, going to England in 1870 as engineer to the Hartlepool Port and Harbour Commission executing the designs of Thomas Dyke.

He lived at Queensberry Lodge at the edge of Granton near Wardie. He died in Granton on 26 April 1906. He is buried against the south wall of the main Warriston Cemetery, backing onto the Water of Leith Walkway.

== Family ==
He was married to Mary Belk of Hartlepool (1844–1925) daughter of Thomas Belk, town clerk of Hartlepool.
