= HMS Claverhouse =

Training centre in Edinburgh, Scotland

- Granton, Edinburgh
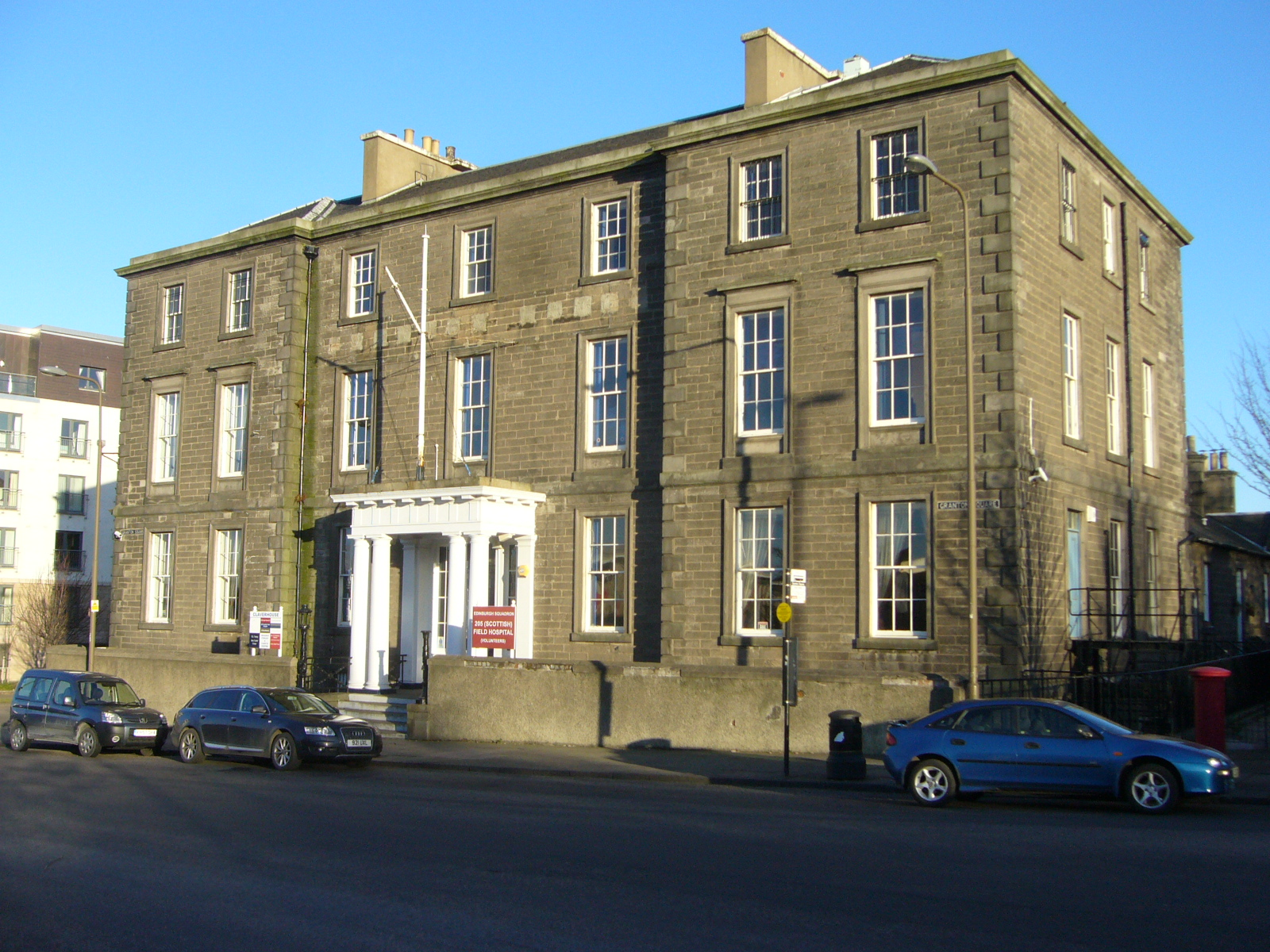
- Claverhouse Training Centre

Site information
- Type: Training Centre
- Controlled by: United Kingdom

Location
- Shown within Scotland
- Location within Scotland
- Coordinates: 55.980618°N 3.224330°W

Site history
- In use: 1939–1994

Garrison information
- Garrison: Royal Navy

HMS Claverhouse was a shore establishment of the British Royal Navy, based at Granton, Edinburgh. It is a listed building. Until 2023, when 205 (Scottish) Field Hospital (Volunteers) RAMC was disbanded, the hospital's E Squadron used it as a training centre.

== History ==
=== Early years ===
The building was originally part of a planned waterside development by the Duke of Buccleuch in the late 1830s and was completed in 1938. The site was important as it fronted the new pier. The design is attributed to William Burn by John Gifford, Colin McWilliam, and David Walker in Edinburgh, although previous descriptions state that it was designed by John Henderson.

It is a 3-storey building with a basement. It is symmetrical and rectangular-plan in the classical tradition. The exterior is coursed, tooled sandstone with ashlar dressings; decorative features include band courses above and below piano nobile, V-jointed angle quoins, eaves cornice and architraved windows. There is a Doric entrance porch on the west side. Cast-iron torchere lamp standards with nautical finials flank the entrance.

=== Service history ===
On the outbreak of World War II in September 1939, the navy took over the Granton Hotel, close to Granton Harbour and commissioned it as HMS Claverhouse for Reserve training. From April 1940 it was in use for Merchant Navy Defence Courses, and also served as the headquarters for the Motor Launches of the local Coastal Forces.

Decommissioned on 15 August 1945, Claverhouse then became the Training Centre of the Forth Division. It was also a drill ship until 1958.

=== Current use ===
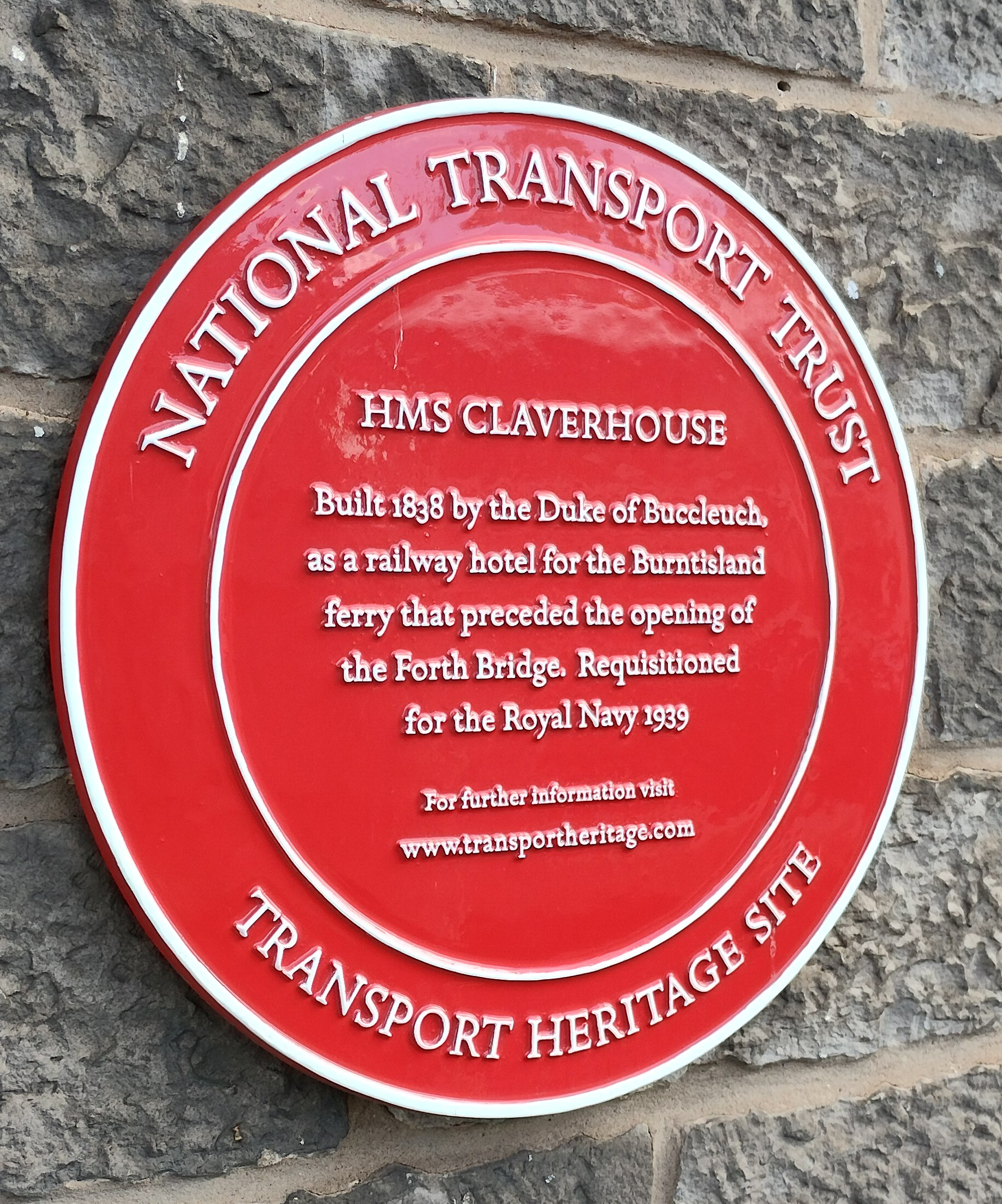
A National Transport Trust plaque affixed to the building.

The principal elevations are largely unaltered and retain a number of early/original fixtures and fittings, including the main entrance and lamp standards. The building, including the lamp standards, has been a category B listed building since 1970.

The building is known as the "Claverhouse Training Centre" and is the HQ for E Squadron, 205 (Scottish) Field Hospital (Volunteers), No.17 (Granton) Platoon, Army Cadet Force and the Edinburgh Trinity Sea Cadets.
