= James May's Toy Stories =

British television documentary series (2009–2014)

- Genre: Documentary
- Created by: James May
- Written by: James May; Henry Dalton; Will Daws; Stuart Cabb
- Directed by: Tom Whitter; Paul Buller; Alexander Dunlop; Graham Strong; Henry Dalton
- Presented by: James May
- Narrated by: James May
- Country of origin: United Kingdom
- Original language: English
- No. of series: 1
- No. of episodes: 6 (Episodes); 4 (Specials)

Production
- Executive producers: Will Daws; Stuart Cabb
- Producers: Tom Whitter; Henry Dalton; Rebecca Magill; Dan Lewis
- Production location: Various
- Editors: Ian Holt; Henry Dalton
- Running time: 60 minutes
- Production company: Plum Pictures

Original release
- Network: BBC Two
- Release: 27 October – 25 December 2009
- Release: 12 June 2011 – 25 December 2014

James May's Toy Stories is a UK documentary television series created and presented by James May, and produced by Plum Pictures for the BBC. The programme focused on bringing some of the most notable toys conceived in the past into the modern era to a "new generation of children", by putting each toy into a complex, large-scale project involving the nature of the toy. The projects, often ambitious, required an extensive team of experts, and in some cases required a large group of volunteers to help achieve the project's goal.

The programme was originally commissioned for BBC Two as a six-episode series for 2009, between 27 October to 25 December, but later received four specials after the series concluded – one in June 2011 and three more for the Christmas broadcast schedules between 2012 and 2014.

== Format ==
The focus of the documentary was on six notable toys during the original series of episodes, including their history, each of which were chosen to see if they could be possibly capable of achieving a remarkable goal in real-life on a grand scale. For each toy, the nature of its purpose fundamentally underlined the project's core task, whether it was to recreate something using similar methods with the toy, or attempting push the toy with a challenge not attempted before with it. May, who had presented documentaries on toys with James May's Top Toys and James May: My Sisters' Top Toys, chose the toys to be used on the programme, and fundamentally involved people in his new programme with whom he had worked with on other projects, including Tiff Needell and Oz Clarke. The basic premise of the programme, as May put forward was:

For too long now we have regarded the great toys as mere playthings. It's time to use them to bring people together and achieve greatness...

The scale of the projects meant that the production team had to recruit specialists to provide technical assistance, including architects, designers and engineers, while in others, large teams of volunteers were required to handle construction work - an example of this was the involvement of a project involving model trains, which required volunteers to help set up a vast line of track along with connecting power supplies to it, and then dismantle it afterwards - and so appeals were made in local papers for assistance by programme researchers. Some of the projects were so elaborate, that careful planning had to be made to ensure that each ran smoothly and did not cause disruptions within the main area it was being conducted within.

=== Future of construction projects ===
Several of the projects that required considerable construction on the programme, were later held on by various groups:

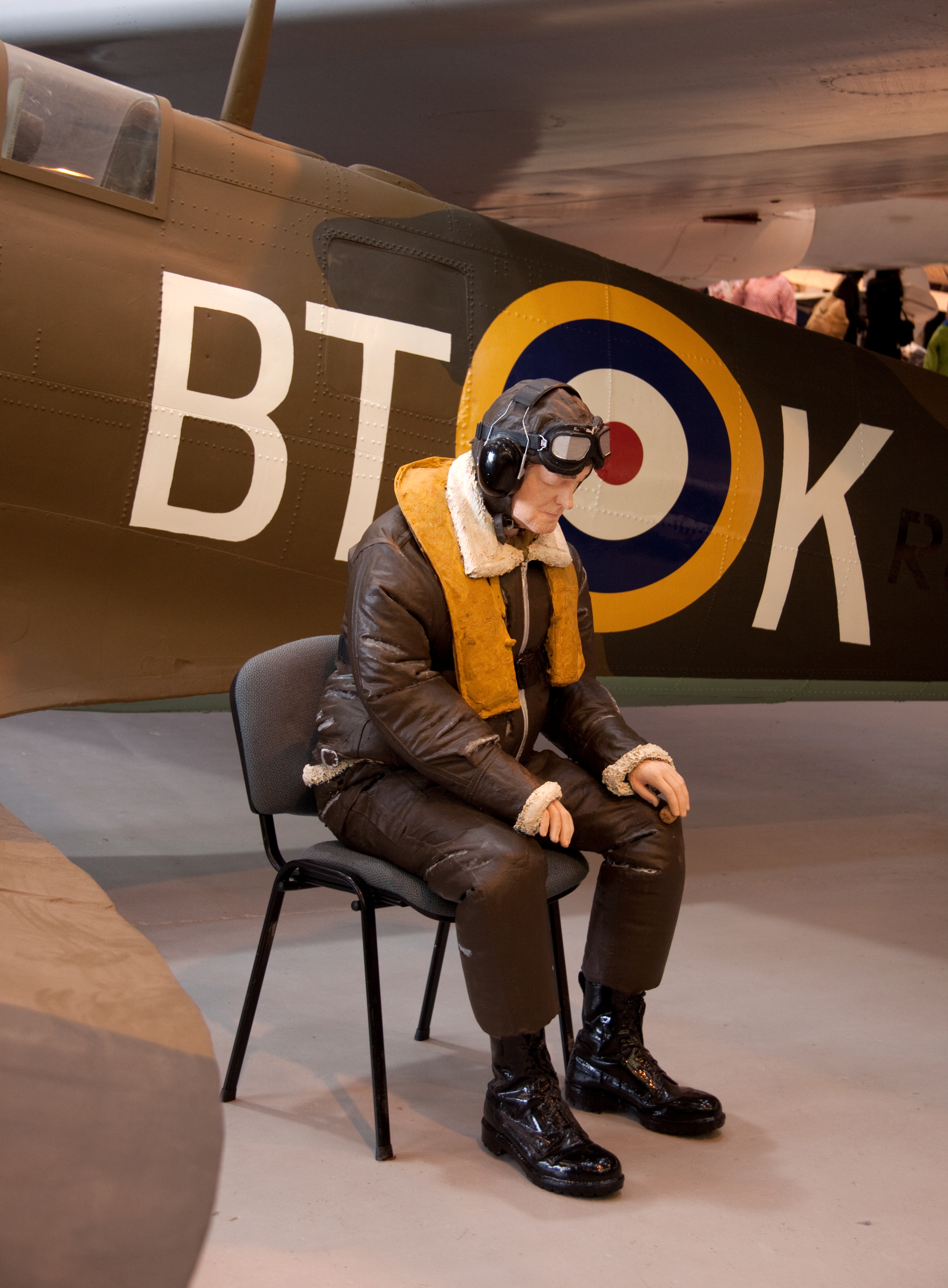
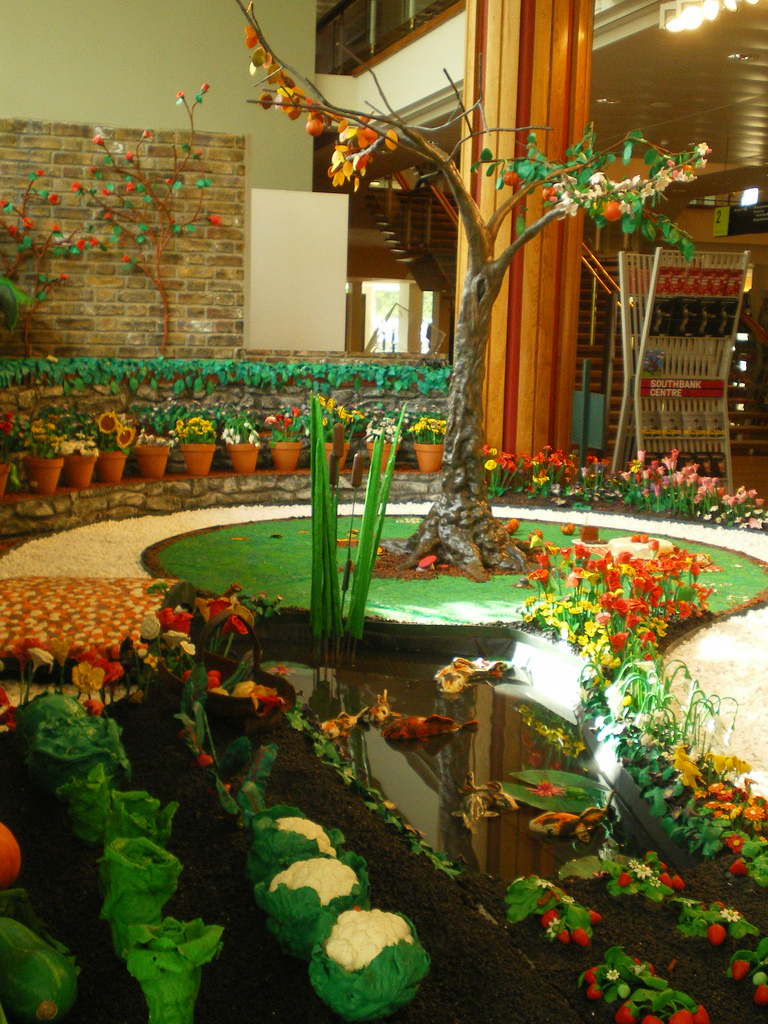
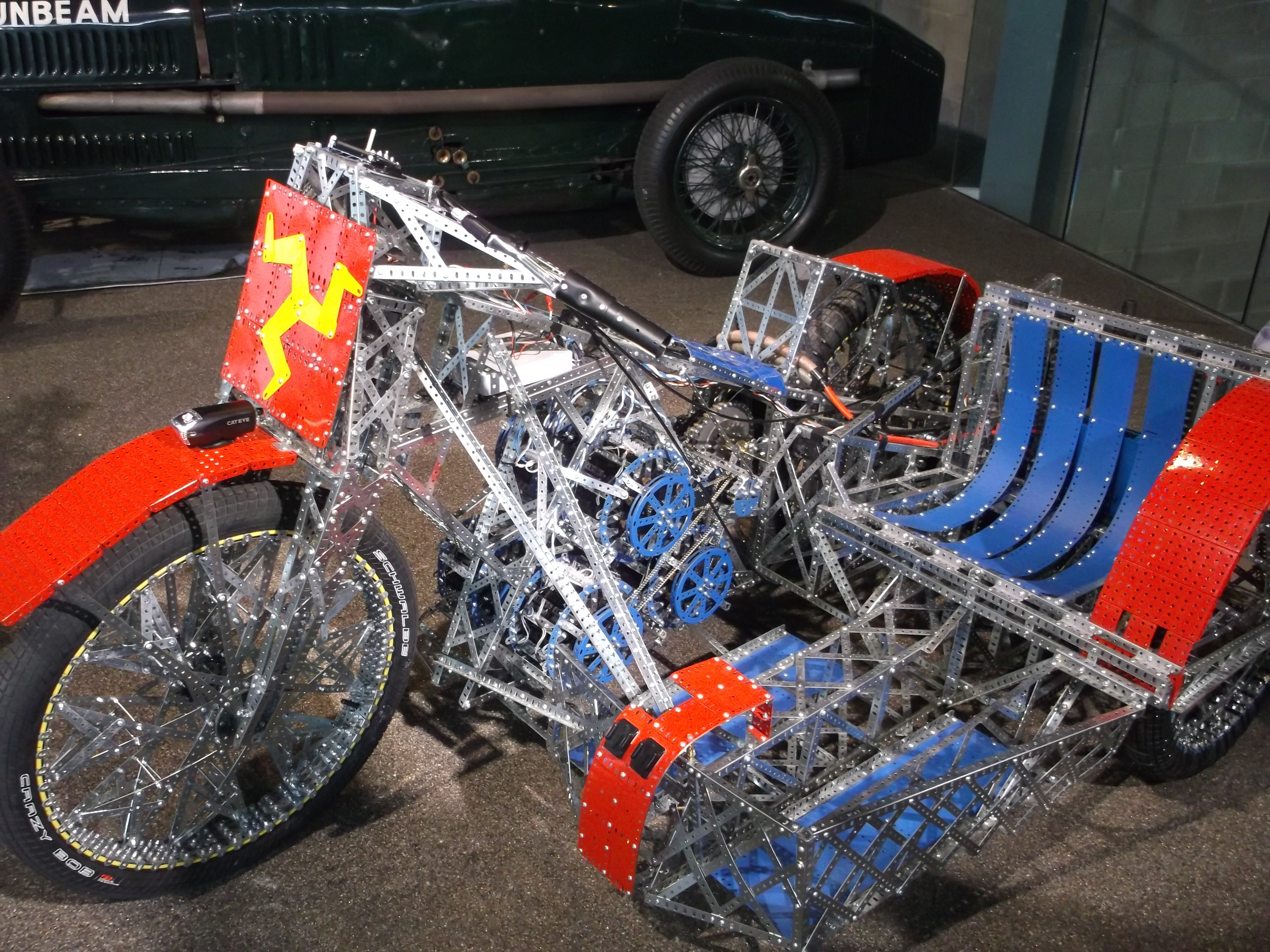
Some of the projects undertaken by the programme - a life-size model of an Airfix Spitfire, complete with a model pilot based on May; a life-size Plasticine garden for the 2009 Chelsea Flower Show; and a life-size Meccano motorcycle used on the Isle of Man TT circuit.
- A life-sized model of an Airfix Spitfire showcased at Royal Air Force Museum Cosford, as part of its project, was kept by the museum and put on to display until November 2009, before being mothballed until October 2010, when it was returned to Cosford's Hangar 1.
- A life-sized Plasticine garden was moved to Sudbury Hall in Derbyshire in July 2009, following its project, placed on display in the upper mall of the Octagon Shopping Centre in Burton upon Trent in February 2010, and then moved to a new home in Wolverhampton in March 2013.
- Two bridge sections made of Meccano were kept by the University of Liverpool, whose pupils had built both for its project, with one section put on public display within the university's engineering department. A motorcycle, also made of Meccano, was given to the National Motor Museum in Beaulieu following the completion of its project.

However, a project that involved constructing a house from Lego could not be preserved. An attempt to sell it to the Legoland theme park in Windsor fell apart, after the cost of dismantling and reassembling was judged too expensive, The house could not remain at its site at a vineyard because the space was needed for vines and there was no planning permission. Further attempts were unable to prevent it from being dismantled on 22 September 2009; the bricks used in it were donated to charity.

== Episodes ==
=== Series 1 (2009) ===
No. overall	No. in series	Title	Original release date	UK viewers (millions)
1	1	"Airfix"	27 October 2009	3.93
To see if he can entice a new generation of kids into enjoying model kits, James May assigns a group of pupils with constructing a life-size model of Airfix's notable kit - the Spitfire. While May must train up the pupils in becoming an organised model-making team, the kit's life-size parts require a specialist company in Cornwall to create these and handling the issues their creation cause. When the kit is finally created and brought to an air museum for construction, the real test comes with the completed model being able to hold itself together, especially when the supports for the main body are removed. The project proves a success when the completed kit can be showcased to an audience that include the pupil's parents and RAF WWII veterans.
2	2	"Plasticine"	3 November 2009	3.46
To see the possible potential of the artistic toy, James May decides to create an entire garden out of Plasticine and enter it into the 2009 Chelsea Flower Show. After creating a design that is accepted for the show, the project soon has the momentous task of recruiting volunteers to make flowers, decorations and an entire tree, and providing a secure storage space for completed works of art. The real test comes when the team must set up the garden before the Flower Show begins, and seeing if it can capture the minds and hearts of those visiting the event. Although not considered a true garden, the project proves a success when judges deem it a worthy entry and give it a special award. Note: The finished project was later given 'The People's Choice' award, after filming was completed.
3	3	"Meccano"	10 November 2009	3.86
To see the full potential of the engineering toy of Meccano, James May recruits a team of architectural, engineering and technical students from University of Liverpool to build an entire bridge made out of Meccano. The bridge was engineered by Hayden Nuttall and Adam Miller of the engineering firm Atkins, who won the chance via a Dragon's Den type pitch to James, former politician Edwina Currie and a professional bridge engineer. The finished project, consisting of two parts - a swing bridge, and a rolling bascule bridge - is eventually rolled out into the heart of Liverpool's newly redeveloped Pier Head, in order to span a canal, where May has the daunting task of crossing the new bridge to the other side. Despite a minor issue in setting up, the bridge proves a success, with May celebrating the achievement by unveiling a special model made of Meccano, dubbed "The Liver Bird", to commemorate the project's success.
4	4	"Scalextric"	17 November 2009	4.22
To bring back racing to the former race track of Brooklands in Surrey, James May decides to rebuild the track in Scalextric, while training up a team of volunteer racers to compete against a team of experienced Scalextric racers. For his expert engineer and designer, the challenges of building the track include dealing with busy roads, a lake, several fences, and a major company headquarter that have been placed along the former Brooklands circuit, along with developing a firm method to keep the Scalextric cars on the circuit as much as possible. When race day finally arrives, May looks on to see which team wins, aided by race reporting from Tiff Needell, whereupon the challenge proves a success thanks to skillful planning that allows both teams to complete the circuit. Note: The completed project later earned a place in the Guinness World Records for that year, for the longest slot car track ever built at 2.95 miles (4.75 km).
5	5	"Lego"	20 December 2009	4.85
To prove Lego is the ultimate construction toy, James May recruits volunteers to make hollowed bricks out of Lego for a taskforce of builders to use to construct the world's first full-size Lego house. Along with the strengths and weaknesses in using the toy for construction, his team of expert architects have to constructed the perfect Lego beam to support someone in the house's second storey, while his designer must work hard to create furniture and decorations in Lego. Despite the challenges, the house is soon finished in time for May to see how it would be like to live in it for the night, receiving special recognition as a piece of artwork.
6	6	"Hornby"	25 December 2009	3.04
James May sets himself the ambitious task of creating the longest model railway line, set along the picturesque Tarka Trail between the towns of Barnstaple and Bideford. The team of volunteers, joined by Oz Clarke and the German founders of Miniatur Wunderland, find themselves with the task of setting up ten miles of model track, and ensuring five different model trains - including May's very own 1970s-vintage model of the Flying Scotsman, and the prototype of Hornby's Class 395 "Javelin" model - can complete the journey between the towns. The project is soon deemed a failure, when each train slowly breaks down in succession across the day of the challenge, due to extensive overworking of their model motor component. Note: It was later revealed after filming of the episode had been completed, that the project was hampered by the theft of track and material that had been set aside along the line's route, the day before the challenge was to take place.

=== Specials (2011–2014) ===
No. overall	No. in series	Title	Original release date	UK viewers (millions)
7	1	"The Great Train Race"	12 June 2011	2.46
James May reattempts his challenge to create the longest model railway line between Barnstaple and Bideford, but this time with a race between British model railway enthusiasts against a German team from Miniatur Wunderland. With sturdier track and a new power system, along with Oz Clarke helping out, the teams compete with three different model trains - a steam locomotive, an electric train, and a modified model train with a unique power source - racing from opposite ends. The renewed attempt proves a success, completing what was started in 2009, with the British beating the Germans by being the first to their destination with two trains.
8	2	"Flight Club"	23 December 2012	2.01
James May decides on a new challenge for model kits - to fly an unpowered model glider, in this case one of the Slingsby Swallow across the English Channel. With a team of engineering students from Brunel University, led by engineer Simeon Oakley, the challenge brings forth several problems, particularly when their initially intended route can't be used because of issues from air traffic controllers. Forced to send the glider across the Bristol Channel, further issues from the weather lead May having to guide the glider to a safe landing on the island of Lundy. Despite the risks, May manages to successfully complete the challenge, reaching the glider's destination within an hour of its launch.
9	3	"The Motorcycle Diary"	3 January 2014	2.14
James May puts Meccano under an even bigger challenge of its engineering capabilities - to create a fully working motorcycle from the toy, complete with working engine, and use it to complete a lap of the Isle of Man TT Course. With engineers and technicians, led by engineer Simeon Oakley, the team have a daunting task constructing all the necessary components and creating an engine powerful enough for the bike. The finished bike soon is brought to the circuit, with May joined by Oz Clarke for the task on hand, but soon faces more daunting problems trying to make the bike work efficiently. Despite the problems, the team manage to get the bike to complete a full lap of the circuit before the opening of the 2013 TT race, with Clarke celebrating success in traditional style.
10	4	"Action Man at the Speed of Sound"	25 December 2014	1.69
James May conducts an impossible task of seeing if Action Man, the most derided toy in Britain, can travel faster than the speed of sound. With a team led by engineer Simeon Oakley, they determine the best means is use a rocket for the challenge, after their initial effort based on the Baumgartner jump fails. However, as they work to make a sturdy rocket and ensure the toy can return to the ground safely, they soon face a race to achieve their goal against a rival group using a similar plan, but with the toy Sindy. On launch day, May's team not only are successful in completing their challenge, but also beat their rivals, who had launched earlier, by going faster than them in their attempt.

== Reception ==
=== Awards and nominations ===
The series was nominated in the Features category of the 2010 British Academy Television Awards, but lost out to the eventual winner, Masterchef: The Professionals.

== Other media ==
James May released a book in conjunction with the series, through Conway Publishing (2009).
