= Oz and Hugh Drink to Christmas =

- Genre: Food and drink
- Directed by: Mark Powell
- Starring: Oz Clarke; Hugh Dennis
- Country of origin: United Kingdom
- Original language: English
- No. of episodes: 1

Production
- Executive producer: Nick Shearman
- Producer: Mark Powell
- Running time: 60 minutes

Original release
- Network: BBC Two
- Release: 20 December 2009

Related
- Oz and James's Big Wine Adventure; Oz and James Drink to Britain; Oz and Hugh Raise the Bar

Oz and Hugh Drink to Christmas is a BBC television programme in which wine personality Oz Clarke and comedian Hugh Dennis travel through Britain to sample a wide array of seasonal Christmas beverages, including whisky, winter ales, mulled wine, wassail, sloe gin, Buck's Fizz, Port wine and Sherry. Upon its 20 December 2009 broadcast on BBC Two, it had a viewership of approximately 2.4 million with an audience share of 9%.

In contrast to Clarke's other programmes with James May, Oz and James's Big Wine Adventure and Oz and James Drink to Britain, the Christmas special was criticised in the press for its greater focus on achieving intoxication and exploring which drinks are more effective in that pursuit. Dublin Evening Herald columnist Katie Byrne described the show as Clarke and Dennis divining that the true spirit of Christmas is "getting hammered".

== Background ==
Oz Clarke is internationally known wine expert and writer who has worked in the wine industry since 1984. He has served as the wine correspondent for the Daily Telegraph and was previously featured on the BBC Two programme Food and Drink. Following the cancellation of Food and Drink, Clarke was paired with Top Gear presenter James May to produce a series of wine and drink related programs for the BBC. In the premise of those shows, Clarke was the beverage expert with James May serving as the "wingman" who was not as knowledgeable about the subject. In December 2009, Clarke was paired with comedian Hugh Dennis, a self-described "half a bottle drinker", to produce a similar odd couple dynamic. The change of front man was a direct result of May's unavailability, owing to the filming of his own factual series James May's Toy Stories. Oz made reference to this on screen stating that May was "off playing with his toys".

== Premise and featured drinks ==
The premise of Oz and Hugh Drink to Christmas is Clarke and Dennis' tasting experience throughout the United Kingdom sampling a variety or beverages "Christmas tipple" traditionally associated with the holiday season. In addition to sampling the drinks, the history of the beverages and their association with the holidays is also explored. Among the drinks featured in the show are whiskies and Winter ales from the Scottish Highlands, mulled wine in Portsmouth, wassail punch in South West England, sloe gin in Wiltshire, the Spanish wine Sherry and the Portuguese wine Port.
