= Acorn DVD =

British media distribution company

RLJE International Ltd
- Trade name: Acorn Media International
- Type: Subsidiary
- Industry: Entertainment retail
- Founded: 1997; 29 years ago, in London, England
- Founder: Peter Edwards
- Headquarters: 8515 Georgia Avenue, Suite 650, Silver Spring, MD, US
- Number of locations: 55 Drury Lane, Covent Garden, London, WC2B 5SQ
- Area served: UK, US, Australia
- Key people: Miguel Penella (CEO, Acorn Media Group); Stuart Shaw (managing director, RLJ Entertainment International); Shane Murphy (managing director, Acorn Media Enterprises)
- Products: DVDs; Gifts
- Parent: RLJ Entertainment
- Website: acornonline.com

RLJE International Ltd, Trading as Acorn Media International, is a British company that publishes and distributes DVDs, as well as selling home-video products and streaming videos with a particular focus on British television.

== History ==
Launched in 1997, Acorn Media U.K. Limited distributes collectible home video products in the U.K. market. By design, Acorn U.K.'s product line often overlaps with the Acorn Media U.S. line. This division of the company also serves as a permanent presence in the U.K. television programming community, a primary source of both Acorn Media U.S. and Acorn U.K. acquisitions.

Important programming franchises for this Acorn division include New Tricks, Criminal Justice, Midsomer Murders, Foyle's War, Trial & Retribution, Wild at Heart, Wainwright Walks, and Inspector George Gently.

In April 2007, Acorn Media U.K. launched Acacia U.K., a healthy living brand encompassing licensed and original programming on DVD.

In 2012, RLJ Companies bought Acorn Media, including a majority share in Agatha Christie Ltd, and Image to form RLJ Entertainment.

In 2021, it began distributing new AMC Studios programming.

== Titles ==
The company publishes television titles (in either individual or box-set formats) including:

=== Situation comedies ===
- Barking
- Chelmsford 123
- Filthy Rich & Catflap 25th Anniversary Edition
- First of the Summer Wine
- Oh, Doctor Beeching!
- Rude Tube
- The Good Life
- The Liver Birds
- To the Manor Born

=== Dramas ===
- Above Suspicion
- Agatha Christie's Partners in Crime
- All Creatures Great and Small (2020 TV series)
- Ashes to Ashes
- The Audacity (coming soon)
- Bad Girls
- Belonging
- The Bretts
- Broadchurch
- Criminal Justice
- Creepshow
- Dark Winds
- Doc Martin
- Down to Earth
- Father Dowling Mysteries
- Footballers' Wives
- Garrow's Law
- Inspector George Gently
- Interview with the Vampire
- Irish Blood
- The Inspector Lynley Mysteries
- Jane Eyre
- Kingdom
- Life on Mars
- Line of Duty
- Mayfair Witches
- Midsomer Murders
- Murderland
- New Tricks
- NOS4A2
- Queer as Folk
- Taggart
- The Fall
- The Smoke
- The Terror
- The Walking Dead: World Beyond
- The Walking Dead: Dead City
- The Walking Dead: Daryl Dixon
- The Walking Dead: The Ones Who Live
- The Tunnel
- Tales of the Walking Dead
- Trial & Retribution
- Waterloo Road
- When the Boat Comes In
- Wild at Heart
- NOS4A2

==== Classic dramas ====
- Dixon of Dock Green
- Sutherland's Law
- Z-Cars

==== Period dramas ====
- A Family at War
- Clochemerle
- Foyle's War
- I, Claudius (US only)
- Ivanhoe
- Lilies
- Lord Peter Wimsey
- Miss Fisher's Murder Mysteries
- The Moonstone
- Penmarric
- Rhodes
- Tenko
- The Bletchley Circle
- The House of Eliott
- The Strauss Family
- The Crimson Field
- The Edwardians

=== Special interest ===
- Antiques Roadshow (UK edition)
- Apollo 11 anniversary DVD
- Britain's Best Drives
- Coal House
- Countryfile
- Extreme Fishing with Robson Green
- Edwardian Farm
- Fred Dibnah's Steam Collection, Railway Collection
- Wainwright Walks with Julia Bradbury
- Wainwright Walks: Coast to Coast with Julia Bradbury
- Railway Walks with Julia Bradbury
- Oz and Hugh Raise the Bar
- Oz and James's Big Wine Adventure
- Victorian Farm
- Who Do You Think You Are? (UK edition)

== See also ==
- Acorn TV
