= James May on the Moon =

- Directed by: Paul King
- Starring: James May
- Country of origin: United Kingdom

Production
- Executive producers: Aidan Laverty; Phil Dolling
- Producer: Paul King
- Running time: 60 minutes

Original release
- Network: BBC Two
- Release: 21 June 2009

James May on the Moon is a British documentary in which James May commemorates the 40th anniversary of the Apollo Moon landings. It was first aired on BBC Two on 21 June 2009 and on 10 November 2009 on BBC America in the United States.

The show saw May interviewing Apollo moonwalkers Harrison Schmitt, Alan Bean, and Charlie Duke, before himself experiencing weightlessness and G-forces similar to that of a Saturn V rocket launch.

As a passenger in a Lockheed U-2 spy plane, May flies to the stratosphere with his instructor pilot, Major John "Cabi" Cabigas, where they are able to view the curvature of the Earth and the atmosphere. His training for this was shown in the BBC Four documentary James May at the Edge of Space.
