= James May's Top Toys =

- Genre: Documentary
- Starring: James May
- Country of origin: United Kingdom
- No. of episodes: 1

Production
- Producer: Scott Tankard
- Running time: 60 minutes

Original release
- Network: BBC Two
- Release: 21 December 2005

James May's Top Toys is a BBC documentary in which James May explored and celebrated his favourite toys, including Etch-A-Sketch, Airfix model aeroplanes, Lego, Meccano, Top Trumps, Scalextric, model cars, and Hornby model trains.

The show included May dropping a parachuted Action Man from a helicopter after an actor named George Huxley dropped it from a window, proving the parachute did not work. Further exploits had May shooting the Action Man figure with an AR-15 type semi-automatic rifle in .22 lr, thereafter referring to the toy as "Killed-in-Action Man".

May also constructed an Airfix model of the battleship Bismarck. Upon completion, he took it out on a boating lake and shot at it with an air rifle, while pretending to be a British seaman firing a salvo at the battleship.

In the feature of the Etch-A-Sketch, Rose Pipette of The Pipettes is one of the students "etching" May on the toy.

A spin off of the show, James May: My Sisters' Top Toys, came on 23 December 2007. In October 2009, a series of 6 shows were broadcast, entitled James May's Toy Stories.
