= Nagoro =

Village on Shikoku, Tokushima Prefecture, Japan

Nagoro 名頃
- Village
- Location in Japan Nagoro (Chūgoku - Shikoku region) Nagoro (Tokushima Prefecture)
- Coordinates: 33°51′23″N 134°01′09″E
- Country: Japan
- Prefecture: Tokushima
- City: Miyoshi
- Chō (District): Higashiiyasugeoi

Population (2026)
  - Total: 25
- Time zone: UTC+9 (JST)

Nagoro (Japanese: 名頃), now known as Nagoro Doll Village (名頃かかしの里, Nagoro Kakashi-no-sato; lit. 'Nagaro Scarecrow village'), is a village in the Iya Valley in the city of Miyoshi, Tokushima Prefecture in the island of Shikoku in Japan. It is known for the large number of realistic dolls positioned throughout the village, which have made it a tourist attraction.

The village is located on Route 439 in the Iya Valley, in a remote mountainous area of in Higashiiyasugeoi-chō, Miyoshi, Tokushima. It formerly had about 300 inhabitants, but the decline in Japan's population has caused that to fall to 35 by January 2015, 30 as of August 2016, , 27 by September 2019, and 25 by January 2026.

In the early 2000s, Tsukimi Ayano, whose family left the area when she was a child, moved back to Nagoro to look after her father, and made a doll in his likeness that she placed in a field. She has since made more than 400, including replacements, and about 350 are in the village. Many are also likenesses of residents or former residents, while others are invented people.

Soon, others followed in Ayano's footsteps. The village school, which closed in 2012, includes a large number of dolls; in one classroom, two children are self-portraits by the last two students to study there, who dressed them in their own clothes. Other dolls include three men sitting at the base of a telephone pole on the outskirts of the village, a man fishing in the river, a group in a bus shelter, and utility workers performing roadwork. The village has become a tourist attraction and is now known as Nagoro Doll Village.

The nearby Nagoro Dam was completed in 1961 and is used for hydropower generation.

In 2020, the village was featured in the final episode of James May: Our Man in Japan, where a scarecrow based on James' likeness was made for him.
