= Oz and Hugh Raise the Bar =

- Presented by: Oz Clarke; Hugh Dennis
- Country of origin: United Kingdom
- Original language: English
- No. of series: 1
- No. of episodes: 4

Production
- Running time: 60 minutes

Original release
- Network: BBC Two
- Release: 21 December 2010 – 2 January 2011

Related
- Oz and James's Big Wine Adventure; Oz and James Drink to Britain; Oz and Hugh Drink to Christmas

Oz and Hugh Raise the Bar is a BBC television programme in which wine personality and expert Oz Clarke and comedian and actor Hugh Dennis travel across Ireland and the United Kingdom in order to sample and discover the wide array of British and Irish alcoholic beverages. In this series they collected different beverages from each location before selling them at a pub in Shustoke. Currently only one series has been made.

== Background ==
Oz Clarke is an internationally known wine expert and writer who has worked in the wine industry since 1984. He has served as the wine correspondent for the Daily Telegraph and was previously featured on the BBC Two programme Food and Drink. Following the cancellation of Food and Drink, Clarke was paired with Top Gear presenter James May to produce a series of wine and drink related programs for the BBC. In the premise of those shows, Clarke was the beverage expert with James May serving as the "wingman" who was not as knowledgeable about the subject. In December 2009, Clarke was paired with comedian Hugh Dennis, a self-described "half a bottle drinker", to produce a similar odd couple dynamic in a one-off special entitled Oz and Hugh Drink to Christmas. Following the success of that one-off special a whole series was created.

== Show premise ==
Oz Clarke and Hugh Dennis travel around the British Isles visiting independent drinks producers and pubs. They then use the drinks they discover during their journey to create two competing bars, which are opened for one night.

== Episodes ==
No.	Title	Original release date
1	"South of England"	21 December 2010
Oz and Hugh's search begins with a tour of England's south. They discover hidden gems, from the award-winning sparkling wines of Sussex to offal and jellyfish flavoured beers of Cornwall, and from alcoholic ginger beer to sweet farmhouse cider. Following a revel in a Cornish pub, Oz concocts some old-fashioned hangover cures, with upsetting results. They later rediscover an ancient pub game, Oz enjoys a face full of beer while 'Dwile Flunking', and Hugh hoodwinks a cider and perry festival crowd with Babycham disguised as home-made perry. In London Oz and Hugh happen upon English lager, meet a specialist gin producer and take on a cocktail mixologist in a Caribbean rum shack.
2	"Scotland and Ireland"	26 December 2010
Oz and Hugh's tour of Gaelic grog kicks off in Perthshire and a visit that begins with non-alcoholic fruit wine tasting and ends with a bottle-smashing competition. A visit to Scotland wouldn't be complete without taking a close look at whisky, which turns out to be a little too close for Oz's comfort when he is attacked by flying malt. Continuing west, their dedication to research knows no bounds as it's off to the Inner Hebrides and Easdale Island's most popular, and only, pub. To Northern Ireland and the Republic next, where an embarrassing confession to liking Irish cream by Hugh leads them to make their own version of the drink, even down to sourcing the cream straight from the cows' udder. Next on the agenda was a visit to a microbrewery in Roscommon town, where they sampled a local ale produced by a fledgling brewery, while also visiting a local pub in that town. Oz then unleashes their creation on the unsuspecting public before the pair head off to Galway where a visit to an oyster festival leads to them employing some desperate measures to get an independent stout that doesn't begin with the letter 'G'.
3	"North of England"	27 December 2010
Oz and Hugh head to the north of England in their dodgy Dutch campervan and things get lively when a Manchester real ale tasting gets completely out of hand. Oz takes orders from a cider-making Benedictine monk, and Hugh goes undercover dressed as a whoopee cushion for the famous Otley Run pub crawl. Oz and Hugh brave the beehives and learn how to make honey for a honey beer in Cheshire, taste the most Northern wine in the UK made in Morecambe Bay and compete to make the most popular flavoured beer in a Saltaire brewery. More drinks are divvied up and added to the growing collection of the best of British drinks.
4	"Wales"	2 January 2011
In the final furlong of Oz and Hugh's journey across the British Isles, their pub grand opening is looming. They head to Wales to feed beer to some boozing bovines, risk life and limb convincing local rugby lads to swap their lager for Welsh wine, and seek inspiration from one of the most bizarre pubs in the country – Leintwardine's Sun Inn. After a tour of a Wolverhampton pork scratching factory, Oz fries up an unusual part of the pig's anatomy to produce his own version of this pub essential. Armed with their drinks from across the nation, the journey ends with opening time at their very own pub for one night only. Will the locals prefer Oz or Hugh's drinks?
