= James May's Things You Need to Know =

- Title card
- Genre: Science
- Directed by: James Gray, Emma Parkins
- Presented by: James May
- Country of origin: United Kingdom
- Original language: English
- No. of series: 2
- No. of episodes: 9

Production
- Executive producer: John Farren/Elliot Halpern
- Running time: 29 minutes
- Production companies: 360 Production, Yap Films

Original release
- Network: BBC Two & BBC HD
- Release: 20 June 2011 – 17 September 2012

James May's Things You Need to Know is a British television series presented by Top Gear presenter James May. The first, three-part series was aired on BBC Two between 20 June and 4 July 2011. A second, six-part series was aired on BBC Two starting 13 August 2012. The show answers key questions on aspects of everyday life, including what makes up the human body, what a cloud is and what makes the universe work so effectively. The first series has yet to be released on DVD.

== Episodes ==
=== Series One (2011) ===
No. overall	No. in series	Title	Directed by	Original release date
1	1	"The Human Body"	Emma Parkins	20 June 2011
2	2	"The Universe"	James Gray	27 June 2011
3	3	"The Weather"	Elizabeth Trojian	4 July 2011

=== Series Two (2012) ===
No. overall	No. in series	Title	Directed by	Original release date
4	1	"Einstein"	David Starkey	13 August 2012
5	2	"The Brain"	Catherine Ross	20 August 2012
6	3	"Evolution"	Alex Mcintosh	27 August 2012
7	4	"Speed"	Catherine Ross	3 September 2012
8	5	"Engineering"	David Starkey	10 September 2012
9	6	"Chemistry"	Robin Bicknell	17 September 2012
