= James May: The Reassembler =

- Written by: James May
- Directed by: Dan Lewis
- Starring: James May
- Country of origin: United Kingdom
- No. of series: 2
- No. of episodes: 7

Production
- Executive producers: Will Daws; Stuart Cabb
- Producer: Dan Lewis
- Running time: 30 minutes (BBC Four), 45 minutes (DVD, Quest, Together TV, On-demand)

Original release
- Network: BBC Four
- Release: 4 April 2016

James May: The Reassembler is a BBC Four documentary programme focusing on the reassembly of various pieces of technology from the past. The host, James May, discusses the item, its place in society, historical significance, and the engineering principles of the components whilst he reassembles the final product back to its original state.

Featured items have included a Fender Stratocaster electric guitar, a 1970s Honda Z50A miniature trail motorcycle, a dial telephone from the late 1950s, as well as a plethora of other items.

During this time, May was the only one out of the former Top Gear trio still doing work for the BBC. The three moved to Amazon's The Grand Tour in 2016 after they had not renewed their Top Gear contracts. Although the relationship between Clarkson and the BBC had gone quite sour, May still released The Reassembler on BBC Four.

== Episodes ==
=== Series overview ===
Series	Episodes	Originally aired	
Series	Episodes	Series premiere	Series finale
1	3	4 April 2016	6 April 2016
2	4	28 December 2016	18 January 2017

=== Series 1 (2016) ===
No. overall	No. in series	Title	Original release date	Viewers
1	1	"Lawnmower"	4 April 2016	659,000
James reassembles the 331 parts of a 1959 Suffolk Colt
2	2	"Telephone"	5 April 2016	578,000
James reassembles the 211 parts of a 1957 Bakelite body GPO dial phone
3	3	"Electric Guitar"	6 April 2016	555,000
James reassembles the 147 parts of a Tōkai Gakki "Goldstar Sound" Stratocaster replica.

=== Series 2 (2016–2017) ===
No. overall	No. in series	Title	Original release date	Viewers
4	1	"Christmas: Hornby Train Set"	28 December 2016	666,000
James reassembles the 138 parts of a 1972 Hornby Flying Scotsman (with realistic chuffing sounds)
5	2	"Food Mixer"	4 January 2017	N/A
James reassembles the 235 parts of a 1960s Kenwood Chef A701A Food Mixer
6	3	"Mini Motorcycle"	11 January 2017	478,000
James reassembles the 303 parts of a 1970s Honda Z50A Mini Trail Motorcycle
7	4	"Portable Record Player"	18 January 2017	493,000
James reassembles the 195 parts of a 1963 Dansette Bermuda

While the BBC Four airings were in a 30-minute timeslot, an extended 45-minute version of each episode was released on DVD and is the version available across various video-on-demand platforms. The extended versions of Series 1 have also been shown on Quest and both seasons on Together TV, in an hour-long slot incorporating commercials. The extended versions are also publicly available for free on the YouTube channel Naked Science.

== See also ==
- Wheeler Dealers - A programme showcasing the purchase of, as well as repairs and improvements made to a vehicle by a mechanic.
- Salvage Hunters - A series of a similar concept related to buying and selling antiques
- Top Gear - A motoring programme in which May was one of the three presenters between 2003 and 2015.
- The Grand Tour - A motoring show produced by Amazon Prime Video in which May was one of the three presenters.
