= James May: Oh Cook! =

Cooking series hosted by James May

- Written by: James May
- Directed by: Will Daws; Tom Whitter
- Presented by: James May
- Country of origin: United Kingdom
- No. of series: 2
- No. of episodes: 14

Production
- Executive producers: Will Daws; James May; Tom Whitter
- Producer: William Fisher
- Cinematography: Gary Rogers
- Camera setup: Single-camera
- Running time: 27–32 minutes
- Production companies: Plum Pictures; New Entity (2020); Amazon MGM Studios

Original release
- Network: Amazon Prime Video
- Release: 13 November 2020 – 24 May 2023

James May: Oh Cook! is a cooking programme hosted by James May and released via Amazon Prime Video in 2020. The programme features May attempting to cook a variety of different dishes, with each episode focusing on a particular cuisine or meal. The show's title is a play on James's catchphrase from previous programmes.

From 2019, May was involved in producing food-oriented videos for DriveTribe spin-off FoodTribe. In June 2020, it became apparent that May was working on a cookery show with Amazon. Amazon confirmed the show in July 2020, announcing that it would be released alongside a book, titled Oh Cook!: 60 Easy Recipes That Any Idiot Can Make.

In press interviews released alongside the first series, May stated that he would like to film a second series of the programme abroad, saying he would be interested in learning how to cook a "proper American breakfast".

== Episodes ==
During the episodes May is assisted at times by home economist Nikki Morgan, who is kept in a cupboard until her assistance is required.

=== Series 1 (2020) ===
No. in series	Title	Original release date	Length
1	"Asian Fusion"	13 November 2020	0:32
James puts a British spin on food from across the Asian continent.
2	"Pub Classics"	13 November 2020	0:32
James attempts to fry the perfect steak for Nikki, cooks his first pie, and creates a fish pie.
3	"Pasta"	13 November 2020	0:28
James ventures into the world of pasta, creating a lasagne, experimenting whether cream should be used in carbonara, and trying to put a twist on alphabet pasta
4	"Curry"	13 November 2020	0:28
James cooks an Indian-inspired feast featuring lamb keema, dal, chapatis, and a raita.
5	"Pudding"	13 November 2020	0:30
James turns his attention to pudding, creating cakes, custards and crumbles.
6	"Breakfast"	13 November 2020	0:28
James focuses on the first meal of the day, looking at dishes from around the world.
7	"Roast"	13 November 2020	0:27
James, having promised the crew lunch, attempts to cook a Sunday roast.

=== Series 2 (2023) ===
No. in series	Title	Original release date	Length
1	"French Classics"	24 May 2023	0:33
2	"Japanese"	24 May 2023	0:32
3	"70's Dinner Party"	24 May 2023	0:31
4	"Vegan"	24 May 2023	0:32
5	"German"	24 May 2023	0:32
6	"Picnic"	24 May 2023	0:31
7	"Mexican"	24 May 2023	0:31

== Release ==
=== Critical reception ===
The programme has a score of 100% on review aggregator Rotten Tomatoes and a 4.7 out of 5 on Amazon Prime Video.

Michael Hogan for The Telegraph gave the series three out of five stars, saying the show has "unlikely charm" and there was "finally a cookery show for blokes". Lucy Mangan for The Guardian gave the series three out of five stars, saying it was "occasionally charming – and mostly slightly dismal".
