= James May at the Edge of Space =

- Directed by: Paul King
- Starring: James May
- Country of origin: United Kingdom

Production
- Executive producers: Aidan Laverty; Phil Dolling
- Producer: Paul King
- Running time: 30 minutes

Original release
- Network: BBC Four
- Release: 21 June 2009

James May at the Edge of Space is a British documentary in which television presenter James May came close to fulfilling his lifelong dream to be an astronaut by flying to the stratosphere in a Lockheed U-2 spy plane. It was first aired on BBC Four on 21 June 2009 as part of commemorations of the 40th anniversary of the first Apollo Moon landing, and tied in with another May documentary an hour earlier on BBC Two called James May on the Moon.

The programme followed May's three days of training with the United States Air Force at Beale Air Force Base in which he practised safety drills and learnt how to use a space suit correctly. With training complete, he was taken on a four-hour flight reaching an altitude of over 70,000 feet (21,000 m), piloted by instructor pilot Major John "Cabi" Cabigas.
