= Oz and James Drink to Britain =

- Directed by: Michael Davies
- Starring: James May, Oz Clarke
- Country of origin: United Kingdom
- Original language: English
- No. of series: 1
- No. of episodes: 8

Production
- Executive producers: Mark Hill, Chris Stuart
- Production locations: United Kingdom, Ireland
- Running time: 30 mins

Original release
- Network: BBC Two
- Release: 6 January – 24 February 2009

Related
- Oz and James's Big Wine Adventure; Oz and Hugh Drink to Christmas; Oz and Hugh Raise the Bar

Oz and James Drink to Britain is a BBC television series in which wine writer Oz Clarke and motor journalist James May travel through Britain and Ireland to discover the array of available alcoholic drinks. The series is a sequel to Oz and James's Big Wine Adventure, and followed the same format, with the established dynamic between Clarke and May of bickering and bantering while drinking alcohol. The chosen vehicle of this series is a 1982 Rolls-Royce Corniche convertible.

Upon broadcast the first episode had a viewership of approximately 3.4 million with an average audience share of 15%.

== Episode list ==
Episode	Subject	Airdate
1	Clarke and May travel to Yorkshire and Derbyshire, learn what goes into beer and visit a vineyard.	6 January 2009
2	Clarke and May travel to Wigan and visit a small commercial brewery.	13 January 2009
3	Clarke and May travel to Scotland, receive a blindfolded whisky tasting and meet brewers.	20 January 2009
4	Clarke and May travel to Ireland, test Irish Guinness and host "Strictly Come Drinking".	27 January 2009
5	Clarke and May taste some extreme beers, and attempt to work as barmen.	3 February 2009
6	Clarke and May travel to Wales, sample vodka, perry and wines before having their own Homebrew beer judged at the Worcester Beer Festival	10 February 2009
7	Clarke and May travel to the South West on a traditional cider farm and James makes his own Plymouth Gin.	17 February 2009
8	Clarke and May try British sparkling wine and visit a traditional Kentish hop garden.	24 February 2009

== DVD ==
The DVD of Oz and James Drink to Britain, which contains footage not featured on the original BBC broadcasts, was released in the UK on 16 March 2009.

== U.S. Broadcast ==
The series was also broadcast on BBC America, renamed "James May Drinks to Britain."
