= Jilly Goolden =

English wine critic, journalist and television personality

- Born: 28 September 1949 (age 77); Surrey, England
- Occupations: Wine critic, journalist and presenter.

Jill Priscilla Goolden (born 28 September 1949) is an English wine critic, journalist and television personality.

== Early life ==
Goolden is the only daughter (there being also two sons) of Douglas Cyril Aubrey Goolden (1914-2001), of Forge Cottage, Withyham, East Sussex, a lieutenant in the Royal Navy Volunteer Reserve, and Rosemary (1922-2021), daughter of Conservative politician Major Hon. Christopher William Lowther, of the Westmorland and Cumberland Yeomanry (son of Conservative politician and Speaker of the House of Commons James William Lowther, 1st Viscount Ullswater, of the Earls of Lonsdale).

== Career ==
For 18 years Goolden co-presented the popular BBC2 Food and Drink television series in Britain, with Chris Kelly, Michael Barry and her friend Oz Clarke (another oenophile). She is known for her descriptions of wine tasting appreciation often referring to certain wines as reminiscent of pear drops, liquorice and even rubber. In 1995, she was a guest on The Mrs Merton Show S.1 E.3 Goolden also presented two television series on antiques for BBC1, The Great Antiques Hunt and Going, Going, Gone, and she has travelled extensively as a regular presenter on BBC1's Holiday programme. During 2003, she was presenter on BBC1's Holiday – You Call the Shots. In 2004, the Radio Times included Goolden in a list of the top 40 most eccentric TV presenters of all time. In 2005, she appeared in a new Channel 4 series Extreme Celebrity Detox. She has also starred in a mini-drama written and directed by Pauline Quirke and has performed in The Vagina Monologues at the Royal Albert Hall.

In November, 2005, Goolden appeared in ITV1's fifth series of I'm a Celebrity... Get Me Out of Here!. During her time in the jungle Goolden, along with fellow celebrity Carol Thatcher, was voted to do a bushtucker trial. This involved eating various insects and some local delicacies. During the trial, Goolden tried to eat a kangaroo's penis as part of the task but failed to do so. In 2006 she appeared on the television series Celebrity MasterChef.

Goolden has written books on wine and food and palmistry. Her books have appeared in the Sunday Times best-seller list. She has co-written books which include five volumes of Food and Drink, Entertaining with Food and Drink and The Big Food and Drink Book. She co-authored Your Hand – An Illustrated Guide To Palmistry (ISBN 0-434-98141-9) in the early 1980s.

In 2008, Goolden took part in a special of Wife Swap in the UK, swapping with Cynthia O'Neal, the wife of Alexander O'Neal.

She was a judge on the ITV programme Britain's Best Dish for both series from 2007.

== Personal life ==
Goolden married, on 19 May 1984, Paul Marshall, a Department of Health civil servant. He died 21 March 2021. They had three children. Goolden lives in Ashdown Forest where she has hosted wine tasting evenings.
