= James May: Our Man in... =

Travel documentary series (2020–2024)

- Series 1 intertitle
- Written by: James May; Henry Dalton
- Directed by: Tom Whitter
- Presented by: James May
- Country of origin: United Kingdom
- No. of series: 3
- No. of episodes: 15

Production
- Executive producers: Will Daws; Tom Whitter
- Producers: Kate Godfrey; Henry Dalton; Frankie Fathers; Mark Richardson
- Production locations: Japan; Italy; India
- Cinematography: Sean Carswell
- Camera setup: Single-camera
- Running time: 47‒53 minutes
- Production companies: Plum Pictures; New Entity (Series 1–2)

Original release
- Network: Amazon Prime Video
- Release: 3 January 2020 – 5 January 2024

James May: Our Man in... is a travel documentary television series hosted by James May and released via Amazon Prime Video. Each series follows May as he travels a country and undergoes various local activities.

In the first series, titled James May: Our Man in Japan, May's travels are presented as a linear journey traveling from the north end of Japan, via Sapporo and Tokyo to the south island. Series two saw May touring Italy, titled James May: Our Man in Italy. The series takes him from Palermo in Sicily to the Dolomites. A third series titled James May: Our Man in India was ordered in February 2023, and released on 5 January 2024. In October 2024, May confirmed the series had been cancelled.

== Series overview ==
The three series all follow a similar format - May starts at one end of the country, and over a period of weeks travels to the opposite end, experiencing the culture and idiosyncrasies of the different regions as he goes along. To aid him in his journey he is accompanied by a series of guides/translators, as well as the film crew (from series 2-3 usually cameraman Dan (Note: Dan buys a house in Mussomeli for one Euro, and loans James 500 rupees to pay respect to a Thakur, which James then pays back after winning a 500₹ bet later in the show.)) and producer Tom, with whom he frequently breaks the fourth wall and are often tangentially involved in each episode.

=== Episodes ===
Series	Title	Episodes	Originally released
1	Our Man in Japan	6	3 January 2020
2	Our Man in Italy	6	15 July 2022
3	Our Man in India	3	5 January 2024

=== Series 1: Our Man in Japan (2020) ===
No.	Title	Original release date	Length
1	"Go!"	3 January 2020	50 min.
May begins the journey through Japan at Cape Soya, the northernmost tip of Japan on the island of Hokkaido, where he tries dog sledding, yukigassen competitive snowball fighting, plus fishing and eating octopus. He learns about the making of samurai swords and attempts to order Japanese noodles from a food ticket machine restaurant.
2	"Cabbage Roll"	3 January 2020	47 min.
May visits the northern region of Tohoku, where he engages in a Gundam-style giant robot duel piloting "LW-Mononofu" against "Land Walker". James bathes in a natural onsen hot pool following a Yamabushi retreat to the Three Mountains of Dewa. In Sendai, he goes to a Zenryoku Boys J-pop concert followed by clothes shopping. James travels to the deserted town of Namie, Fukushima on the edge of the Fukushima Exclusion Zone, before arriving into Tokyo onboard the Shiki-shima luxury train.
3	"Deodorant"	3 January 2020	51 min.
May starts in a helicopter above Tokyo before meeting guide Yujiro Samurai Taniyama in a cat café. Together they celebrate cherry blossom, eat bento, sing karaoke with salarymen, take part in the Kanamara Matsuri fertility festival, and review automated toilets. James gets pulled over by the police, then meets Minoru Mukaiya, a train melody composer, to write a jingle for "James May Sumimasen" station. The segment ends with consuming conveyor belt sushi, James voice acting as a dog at the Yoyogi Animation Academy, and walking through the TeamLab Borderless interactive digital video exhibit at Mori Art Museum.
4	"Hey Bim!"	3 January 2020	52 min.
May travels from Tokyo to Kyoto, where an unhelpful robotic guide repeatedly informs James about the Sanjō Ōhashi bridge over the Kamo River. He joins a biker gang, riding a Kawasaki ZZR1400 motorbike, to view Mount Fuji where he attempts to interpret the mountain in a painting. Finally James is entertained by a geisha who treats him to a traditional tea ceremony.
5	"Peach Boy"	3 January 2020	50 min.
May arrives in Osaka, where he attempts pachinko but spends his winnings on takoyaki octopus balls and Kobe beef. He and Yujiro perform British humour to a comedy audience to see if it will survive translation. He also visits a sumo wrestling stable, the Korakuen Garden in Okayama, the Peace Memorial Park in Hiroshima, and the Itsukushima Shrine at Miyajima.
6	"Pickled Plum"	3 January 2020	51 min.
May starts in Shikoku, where he cycles across a series of suspension bridges. In Takamatsu, he tries his hand at kyūdō Zen archery and makes udon noodles, after which he visits Nagoro, a deserted village filled with scarecrows. For the final leg of his journey, he travels to Kyushu; in the city of Beppu, he cooks his lunch in geothermal steam, and along with Yujiro is buried in hot sand. He visits a Honda motorcycle factory, rows a small boat through the Takachiho Gorge, dabbles in pottery and ikebana, and acts in a bunraku play, before finishing his journey at Kagoshima.

=== Series 2: Our Man in Italy (2022) ===
No. overall	No. in series	Title	Original release date	Length
7	1	"God’s Apology"	15 July 2022	53 min.
8	2	"House of Pain"	15 July 2022	51 min.
9	3	"Dark Matter"	15 July 2022	51 min.
10	4	"Really, Really Nice Cheese"	15 July 2022	51 min.
11	5	"Hey Pesto"	15 July 2022	51 min.
12	6	"Bye, Bim"	15 July 2022	51 min.

=== Series 3: Our Man in India (2024) ===
No. overall	No. in series	Title	Original release date	Length
13	1	"John"	5 January 2024	49 min
14	2	"A Bit Like Glasgow"	5 January 2024	50 min
15	3	"Calamari"	5 January 2024	52 min

== Production ==
Production for the first series started in Japan in March 2019, with the show being filmed over the course of three months. In August 2021 it was confirmed that a second series, set in the United States, had been commissioned. However, in October 2021 it was announced that filming in the United States could not go ahead as planned due to various restrictions as a result of the COVID-19 pandemic, and instead series two saw May touring Italy.

The concept had originally been pitched to the BBC a number of years earlier, but not commissioned.

== Release ==
Lucy Mangan for The Guardian gave the first series three out of five stars. She praised the travelogue's inclusion of "under-publicised aspects of the [Japanese] culture" but noted James May's interaction with the television crew as low-brow and "strenuously jocular". Joel Keller for Decider enjoyed the series and appreciated that May's "sincere desire to get a feel for Japanese life is worth watching."

Regarding the second series, Anita Singh for The Telegraph gave it four out of five stars. She found the series "enjoyable, even if it does meander", and approved of May's presenting style stating he "is a very pleasant travelling companion".

Like the first two series, the third also received positive reviews. For The Telegraph, Singh gave the series three out of five stars. She found the series derivative of previous travelogues but praised May's style of "slightly bewildered Englishman, resigned to losing his dignity".
