= Oz and James's Big Wine Adventure =

- Presented by: Oz Clarke; James May
- Country of origin: United Kingdom
- Original language: English
- No. of series: 2
- No. of episodes: 13

Production
- Producers: Nick Shearman; Simon Kerfoot
- Production locations: France, California
- Running time: 30 minutes

Original release
- Network: BBC Two
- Release: 26 November 2006 – 18 December 2007

Related
- Oz and James Drink to Britain; Oz and Hugh Drink to Christmas; Oz and Hugh Raise the Bar

Oz and James's Big Wine Adventure is a BBC television programme of which two series have been broadcast. It was presented by wine expert Oz Clarke and motoring journalist James May (at the time, a presenter of Top Gear), with Clarke aiming to educate May (a committed bitter drinker) about wine while undertaking a road trip. The first season focused on France and the second on California. The sequel series Oz and James Drink to Britain, broadcast in 2009, made the change to a focus on the variety of beverages available in the United Kingdom.

== Concept ==
Although technical at times, the programme was light in tone, and much of its entertainment stems from the dynamic of personality clashes between the wine connoisseur, Clarke, and the more pragmatic May whom Clarke at one point described as "an utter scruff" (this was in contrast to May's position as "the gentleman" of the three presenters on Top Gear).

May acts the part of a difficult student and often behaved rude and grumpily, more interested in drinking wine than in talking about it. When he determined that Clarke rambled on pompously, he blew on a whistle, which he called the "Ozillator." At the start of the series, May declared he likes to drink wine, but knows little about it. Clarke teaches him the basics about smells and texture and about grape varieties, showing him how wine is made, what wine goes with what food and exposed May to the culture surrounding wine. They visited various types of winemakers, from those who make wine in small sheds to prestigious producers. Clarke frequently quizzed May, and May gave Clarke challenges. Ultimately, May does pick up some knowledge.

== First series ==
The first series focused on French wine and was first broadcast in the autumn of 2006. Over several weeks, Clarke and May travelled around France's wine regions in a 1989 Jaguar XJ-S convertible that had been modernized by Knowles-Wilkins Engineering.

Repeats on commercial digital channels have split the extended-length (54 minute) first episode into two parts (each focusing on one region) for ease of scheduling, making a six-episode series suitable for broadcast in a set half-hour time slot.

In the United States, it was broadcast on BBC America as "James May's Road Trip" in 2011, running immediately after Top Gear.

Episode	Subject	Airdate
1	Bordeaux and Languedoc-Roussillon wine: basic winemaking.	22 November 2006
2	South West and Provence: wine and food matching.	29 November 2006
3	The Rhône Valley, Châteauneuf-du-Pape: wine blending.	6 December 2006
4	Alsace and Burgundy: terroir, barrel-making.	13 December 2006
5	Champagne. Champagne production	20 December 2006

== Second series ==
Clarke and May travelled through California sampling local wines and meeting winemakers, travelling north from Venice Beach to the Napa Valley. The chosen vehicle of this series was a Monaco motorhome, and in some episodes, a Ford Mustang and a Mini.

Episode	Subject	Airdate
1	Santa Barbara County: Pinot noir.	16 October 2007
2	Paso Robles AVA: terroir.	23 October 2007
3	Monterey AVA: Chardonnay.	30 October 2007
4	Santa Cruz Mountains AVA: artisan wineries, corporate wineries.	20 November 2007
5	San Francisco Bay AVA: Zinfandel.	27 November 2007
6	Los Carneros AVA: sparkling wine.	4 December 2007
7	Sonoma Valley AVA.	11 December 2007
8	Napa Valley AVA: cult wines. blends.	18 December 2007

== Third series ==
The following series, retitled Oz and James Drink to Britain, aired on BBC Two on 6 January 2009. This series featured the duo driving around the United Kingdom in a 1982 Rolls-Royce Corniche, in an effort to discover the wide variety of drinks on offer to Britons. For this series, they visited Camel Valley vineyard in Cornwall, but the beverages were no longer limited to wine, with the very first drink consumed a pint of Yorkshire bitter.

== Tie-in products ==
=== DVDs ===
- Oz and James's Big Wine Adventure: Complete BBC Series One (2006)
- Oz and James's Big Wine Adventure: Complete BBC Series Two – California (2007)
- Oz and James's Big Wine Adventure: Complete BBC Series One & Two Box Set (2008)
- Oz and James Drink to Britain: Complete Series Three (2009)

These titles are all distributed by Acorn Media UK.

=== Books ===
- Oz and James's Big Wine Adventure, Clarke, Oz; May, James (2006). London: BBC Books. ISBN 978-0-563-53900-1
- Oz and James Drink to Britain, Clarke, Oz; May, James (2009). Pavilion Books. ISBN 978-1-86205-846-0
