= James May: My Sisters' Top Toys =

- Genre: Documentary
- Presented by: James May
- Country of origin: United Kingdom
- No. of episodes: 1

Production
- Executive producers: Ben Gale; Tony Moss
- Running time: 60 minutes
- Production company: Visual Voodoo

Original release
- Network: BBC Two
- Release: 23 December 2007

Related
- James May's Top Toys

James May: My Sisters Top Toys is a British television documentary. Presented by James May, it was first broadcast on 23 December 2007 on BBC Two. The show was a spin-off from the 2005 documentary James May's Top Toys, and was first shown as one of three shows which made up the "Top Gear Night In".

The show focused on the toys loved by his elder and younger sisters, including dolls, dolls' houses, dolls' prams, Girls' World, Ladybird Books, Spirograph, and a Palitoy (Kenner) Tree Tots Family House. May speaks about how he often played with them as they were hand-me-downs.

During the show, May sets up a race as a girls' school (Skipton Girls' High School) and a boys' school (Ermysted's Grammar School) battle it out in a go-kart time trial, using their own converted Silver Cross prams. May gets his own made by the pram factory. He tests it out, battling for first place alongside the girls and the boys.
