= Oz Clarke =

British actor and wine writer

Oz Clarke OBE
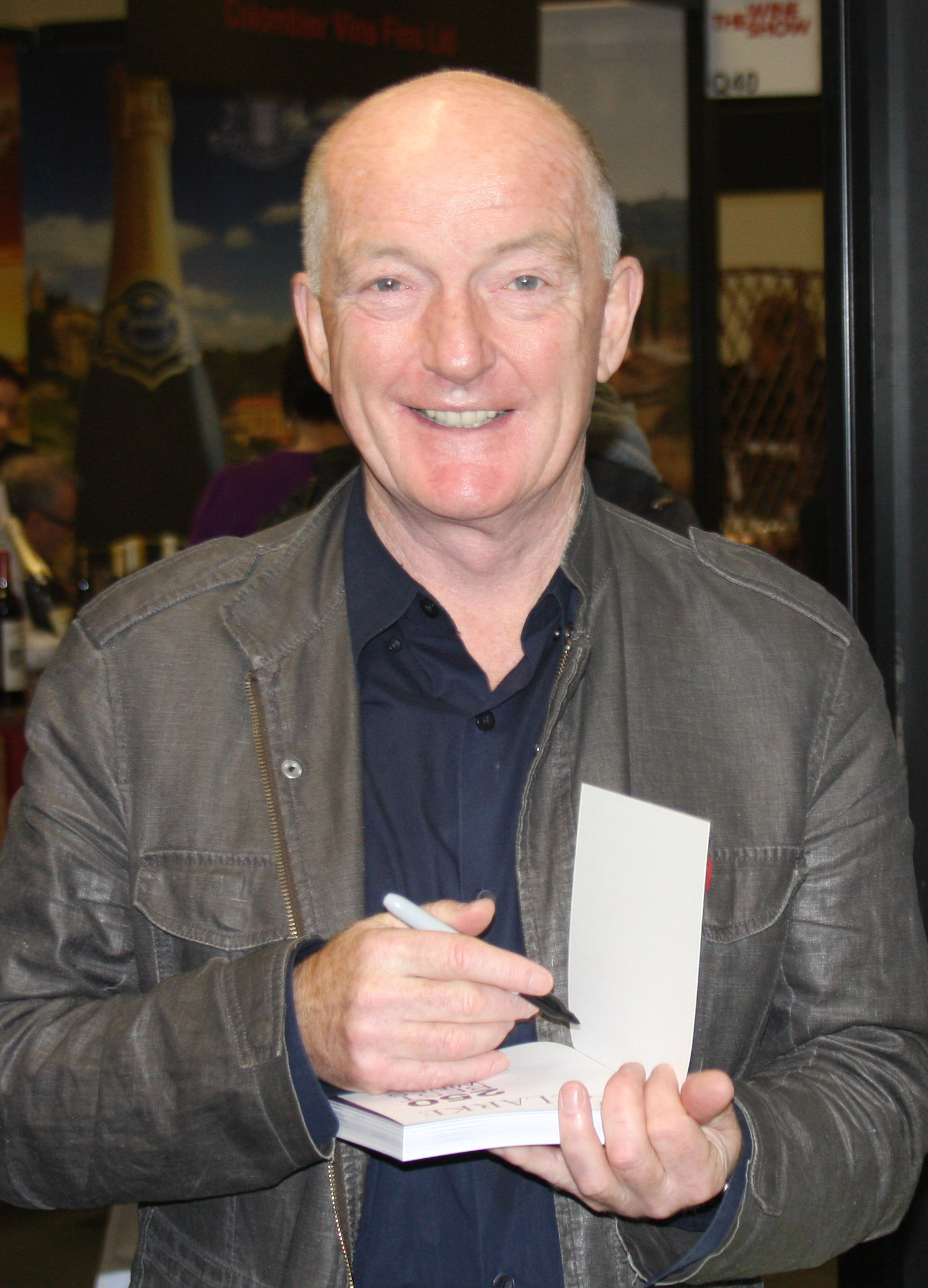
- Clarke in 2011
- Born: 1949 (age 76–77)
- Occupations: Actor, broadcaster, television presenter and wine writer
- Writing career
- Subject: Wine

Robert Owen Clarke OBE (born 1949), known as Oz Clarke, is a British wine writer, actor, television presenter and broadcaster.

== Early life ==
Clarke's parents were a chest physician and a nursing sister. He is of Irish descent and was brought up Roman Catholic. His mother was born in Graiguenamanagh. He was brought up near Canterbury with a brother and a sister. Clarke became a chorister at Canterbury Cathedral and subsequently won a choral scholarship to The King's School, Canterbury. He later attended Pembroke College, Oxford where he studied theology and psychology and became Common Room President. He played University hockey, was University punting champion, sang with Schola Cantorum, and acted with the dramatic society and the Oxford Revue at the Edinburgh Festival. He also captained the wine-tasting team. He is credited in the 1970 Oxford University Opera Club performance of Armide by Gluck (Aronte) and in Le nozze di Figaro the following year.

He claims to have been given his chosen name, Oz, "in the school showers" when he was 13, because he played cricket like an Australian cricketer. The Australian cricket team was touring the UK at the same time. Prior to this, he answered to the name Robbie, or Robin formally. His goal was to educate British people about making wine approachable to the British public, and introduce them to the high quality wines that Australians and most of the Western World enjoys.

Having grown up in Kent, Clarke played cricket for Babes of Kent schoolboys and supports Gillingham. He can be seen wearing a Gillingham scarf in Oz and Hugh Drink to Christmas, broadcast prior to Christmas 2009 and James May's Man Lab Christmas Special, broadcast prior to Christmas 2011, both on BBC Two.

== Acting career ==
After Oxford, Clarke started a career as a full-time actor and singer. His first job was at Northampton, followed by Sheffield, Manchester and Leicester. He then worked for the Royal Shakespeare Company, the National Theatre, the Old Vic and Chichester. In the West End, he appeared with Michael Crawford in Billy at Drury Lane, sang Sweeney Todd in Sweeney Todd, played all the men in The Mitford Girls and General Peron in Evita. It was during this acting period that he was drafted in to the newly formed English Wine Tasting Team, who won competitions against France, Germany and the US, among others. This proved crucial for his career development.

When a wine expert dropped out of the new BBC show Food and Drink, the acclaimed television producer Peter Bazalgette allegedly shouted, 'Get me the actor who knows about wine'. They did, and Clarke's career began to shift away from theatre towards wine, but not out of the entertainment business. He and Jilly Goolden became the voices and faces of wine in Britain for a generation.

He played one of the first criminals apprehended by Superman in the 1978 film Superman, a terrorist in Superman II, a Special Branch man in Who Dares Wins and Balthasar in Stuart Burge's 1984 film of Much Ado About Nothing. He sang the baritone role – and Sam Gamgee's song – in the BBC adaptation of The Lord of the Rings, and having appeared in the premiere at the King's Head Islington, recorded Stephen Oliver's short opera A Man of Feeling for Granada TV.

In December 2011, Clarke was one of the team in the BBC Two programme James May's Man Lab Christmas Special.

== Wine career ==
While performing in Sheila Hancock's Dandy Dick, he joined the Sunday Express as their first wine writer. He then became wine correspondent of The Daily Telegraph.

In 1982, Clarke won the last World Wine Tasting Championship, a wine tasting event that has not been repeated since then.

Clarke has written several award-winning books, and is generally regarded as the New World champion who led Britain's wine revolution in the 1990s and 2000s, but he is also a passionate supporter of the Old World classics, in particular Bordeaux wine. Clarke has appeared on numerous radio and TV shows, including Food and Drink, the long-running BBC Food show, for which he became well known in the UK for his stint as the wine expert alongside Jilly Goolden, and A Question of Taste and The Wine Programme for BBC Radio 4. He made three successful BBC TV series with James May: Oz and James's Big Wine Adventure in France and California, and Oz and James Drink to Britain. The comedian Hugh Dennis was later brought into this concept as Oz and Hugh Drink to Christmas was broadcast in 2009, and the later series, Oz and Hugh Raise the Bar, was broadcast over the Christmas period in 2010.

Clarke stated in Oz and James's Big Wine Adventure that he was banned from the Champagne region of France in the 1990s for having made statements suggesting that champagne was deteriorating in value while rising in price.

In November 2008 a survey by the wine industry consultancy firm Wine Intelligence was made public, having polled the views of more than 1,500 regular UK wine drinkers. Results show that Clarke was the most recognised wine critic in the UK. In 2009 he won the International Wine Challenge Personality of the Year award jointly with James May, in the same week as winning the Louis Roederer International Book of the Year for his book Bordeaux. In 2010 he and James May won the TRIC Award for 'best documentary' (for Oz and James Drink to Britain). He was also awarded an Officier de l'Ordre du Mérite Agricole by the French Government.

Oz Clarke's writing is now published by Pavilion Books, an imprint of Anova Books. In December 2010, he launched his very first app for use on Apple's iPhone and iPad, through Anova Digital: Oz Clarke's Best Wines 2011 and Oz Clarke's Xmas Wines.

In October 2018 his new book Red & White was published by Little, Brown and Company and he embarked on promotional book tour

== Personal life ==
He is a cousin of Irish journalist and broadcaster Olivia O'Leary.

In a 2019 interview, Clarke revealed he was married, with a 3-year-old daughter, his only child.

== Selected bibliography ==
- The Essential Wine Book (1988) ISBN 978-0-670-80731-4
- Oz Clarke's Wine Guide [formerly Webster's Wine Guide] (published annually since the late 1980s, retitled Oz Clarke 250 Best Wines Wine Buying Guide, 2008–present) 2011 edition: ISBN 978-1-86205-896-5
- Oz Clarke's Pocket Wine Book (annually since 1993) Pavilion Books (2007–present) 2011 edition: ISBN 978-1-86205-895-8
- Oz Clarke's New Classic Wines, Simon & Schuster (1991) ISBN 978-0-671-69620-7
- Oz Clarke's New Encyclopedia of French Wines, Simon & Schuster (1991) ISBN 978-0-671-72456-6
- Oz Clarke's Australian Wine Companion, Little, Brown & Co (2004) ISBN 978-0-316-72874-4
- Clarke and Spurrier's Fine Wine Guide, Little, Brown & Co (1998 and 2001) ISBN 978-0-316-64753-3
- Oz Clarke's Encyclopedia of Wine, Little, Brown & Co (1999 and 2003) ISBN 978-0-316-85157-2
- Oz Clarke's Introducing Wine, Little, Brown & Co (2000 and 2003) ISBN 978-0-316-85450-4
- Oz Clarke's Wine Atlas, Little, Brown & Co/Pavilion Books (1995, 2002 and 2007) ISBN 978-1-86205-782-1
- Vinopolis World Wine Guide, Little, Brown & Co (1999) ISBN 978-0-316-85200-5
- Z Cards: Wine & Food Matcher, Wine Vintages. Wine Tasting, Wine Finder (2001)
- Oz Clarke's Grapes and Wines: A Guide to Varieties and Flavours, by Oz Clarke & Margaret Rand (2001, 2003, 2008) ISBN 978-1-86205-835-4
- Sainsbury's Book of Wine, Sainsbury's (1987) ISBN 978-1-870604-00-0
- Sainsbury's Regional Wine Guides Series, Sainsbury's (1988)
- Sainsbury's Pocket Wine Guide, Sainsbury's (1993) ASIN B000RYL20
- Oz Clarke's Wine Companion to... – Bordeaux, Tuscany, Burgundy, California (1997)
- Microsoft Wine Guide (1995–2002, CD-ROM)
- Oz and James's Big Wine Adventure, with Julie Arkell, BBC Books (2006) ISBN 978-0-563-53900-1
- Oz Clarke Bordeaux, Pavilion Books (2006) ISBN 978-1-86205-830-9
- Oz Clarke: Pocket Wine Book 2008 Pavilion Books (2007) ISBN 978-1-86205-780-7
- Oz Clarke: 101 Best Whites and Roses 2008 Pavilion Books (2008) ISBN 978-1-86205-787-6
- Oz Clarke: Grapes & Wines with Margaret Rand, Pavilion Books (2008) ISBN 978-186205-835-4
- Oz Clarke: 250 Best Wines 2008 Pavilion Books (2009) ISBN 978-1-86205-786-9
- Oz Clarke: Pocket Wine Book 2009 Pavilion Books (2008) ISBN 978-1-86205-826-2
- Oz Clarke: 250 Best Wines 2009 Pavilion Books (2008) ISBN 978-1-86205-827-9
- Oz Clarke: 'Let Me Tell You About Wine' – A beginner’s guide to understanding and enjoying wine, Pavilion Books (2009) ISBN 978-1-86205-865-1
- Oz and James Drink to Britain, with James May, Pavilion Books (2009) ISBN 978-1-86205-846-0
- Oz Clarke: Pocket Wine Book 2010 Pavilion Books (2009) ISBN 978-1-86205-863-7
- Oz Clarke: 250 Best Wines 2010 Pavilion Books (2009) ISBN 978-1-86205-866-8
- Oz Clarke: Bordeaux – Second Edition Pavilion Books (2009) ISBN 978-1-86205-830-9
- Oz Clarke: Pocket Wine Book 2011 Pavilion Books (2010) ISBN 978-1-86205-895-8
- Oz Clarke: 250 Best Wines 2011 Pavilion Books (2010) ISBN 978-1-86205-896-5
- Oz Clarke: Pocket Wine Book 2012 Pavilion Books (2011) ISBN 978-1-86205-919-1
- Oz Clarke: 250 Best Wines 2012 Pavilion Books (2011) ISBN 978-1-86205-920-7
- Oz Clarke: Bordeaux – Third Edition Pavilion Books (2012) ISBN 978-1-86205-950-4
- Oz Clarke: Pocket Wine Book 2013 Pavilion Books (2012) ISBN 978-1-86205-968-9
- Oz Clarke: My Top Wines 2013 Pavilion Books (2012) ISBN 978-1-86205-969-6
- Oz Clarke: Pocket Wine Book 2014 Pavilion Books (2013) ISBN 978-1-90910861-5
- Oz Clarke: Grapes & Wines with Margaret Rand, Pavilion Books (2014) ISBN 978-1-90910-862-2
- Oz Clarke: The History of Wine in 100 Bottles, Pavilion Books (2015) ISBN 978-1-90981-549-0
- Oz Clarke: Grapes & Wines with Margaret Rand, Pavilion Books- UPDATED EDITION (2015) ISBN 978-1-90910-862-2
- Oz Clarke Wine A-Z (2015) ISBN 978-1-91049-655-8

== Honours and awards ==
- Youngest ever British Wine Taster of the Year 1973
- Captain of victorious England Wine Tasters Team 1980
- World Wine Tasting Championship winner, 1982
- Wine Magazine Book of the Year 1984
- Wine Guild of the United Kingdom Wine Writer 1984 (Webster's Wine Guide), 1989 (Sainsbury's Book of Wine), 1992 (New Classic Wines)
- Winner of the International World Wine Tasting Championships, Los Angeles
- Glenfiddich Drink Award 1983 (journalism), 1989 (journalism), 1992 (New Classic Wines)
- André Simon Drink Book Award 1992 (New Classic Wines)
- James Beard Wine & Spirits Award 1992 (New Classic Wines)
- Julia Child Cookbook Award (Wine, Beer & Spirits) 1996 (Oz Clarke's Wine Atlas)
- Le Prix Lanson 1997 (Wine Guide CD-ROM)
- Le Prix du Champagne Lanson Special Millennium Award 1999 (for outstanding contribution to wine education and communication during previous decade)
- Jacob's Creek Silver Ladle 1999 (Wine Guide CD-ROM)
- Le Prix Lanson Wine Book of the Year 2002 (Grapes & Wines)
- Special Millennium Award, Le Prix du Champagne Lanson 1999
- Le Prix Lanson Annual Wine Guide of the Year 2004 (Pocket Wine Book)
- International Wine & Spirit Competition Communicator of the Year 2006
- Roederer International Wine Book of the Year 2009 for Bordeaux
- International Wine Challenge Personality of the Year Award 2009: Oz Clarke and James May
- Gourmand Award for Wine Literature 2009 (Oz and James Drink to Britain)
- TRIC award for TV Arts/Documentary programme 2010 (Oz Clarke and James Drink to Britain TV series)
- Officier de l'Ordre du Mérite Agricole 2010

Clarke was appointed Officer of the Order of the British Empire (OBE) in the 2020 New Year Honours for services to broadcasting and journalism.

== See also ==
- List of wine personalities
