= James May =

English television presenter and journalist (born 1963)

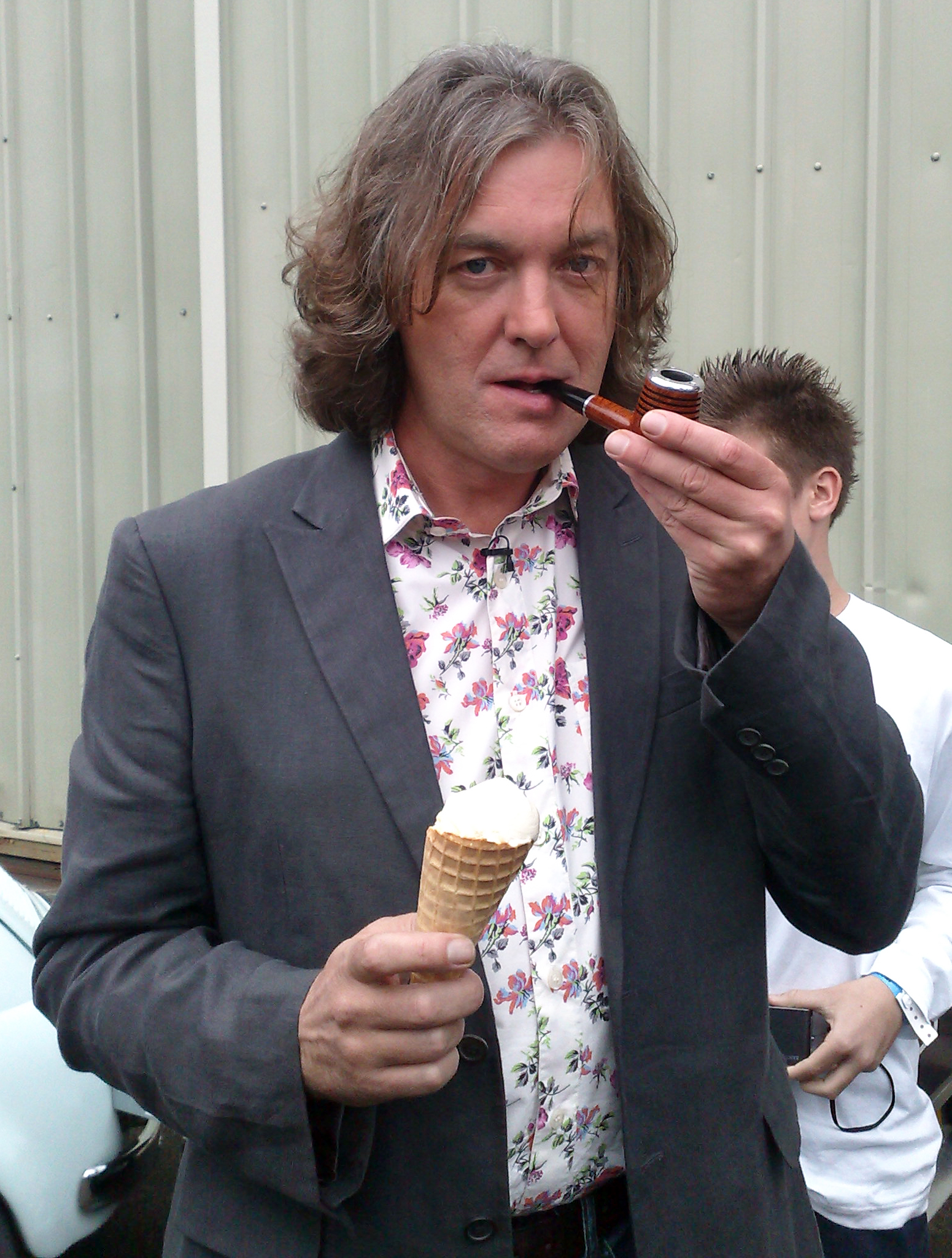
- May in 2007
- Born: James Daniel May; 16 January 1963 (age 63); Bristol, England
- Other names: Captain Slow; Captain Sense of Direction; Mr Slowly
- Education: Lancaster University
- Occupations: Broadcaster; columnist; author; journalist; businessman
- Years active: 1980s–present
- Known for: Top Gear (2002 Series) (2003–15); James May's Toy Stories (2009, 2011–14); The Grand Tour (2016–24); James May: Our Man in... (2020–24); James May: Oh Cook! (2020–23)
- Partner: Sarah Frater (2000–present)

James Daniel May (born 16 January 1963) is an English television presenter, author and journalist. He is best known as a co-presenter, alongside Jeremy Clarkson and Richard Hammond, of the motoring programme Top Gear from 2003 until 2015 and the television series The Grand Tour for Amazon Prime Video from 2016 to 2024. He also served as a director of the production company W. Chump & Sons.

May has presented other programmes on themes including travel, science and technology, toys, wine culture, and the plight of manliness in modern times. He wrote a weekly column for The Daily Telegraph's motoring section from 2003 to 2011.

== Early life ==
James Daniel May was born in Bristol, the son of aluminium factory manager James May and his wife Kathleen. He was one of four children; he has two sisters and a brother. May attended Caerleon Endowed School in Newport, Wales. He spent his teenage years in South Yorkshire, where he attended Oakwood Comprehensive School and was a choirboy at Whiston Parish Church.

May studied music at Pendle College, Lancaster University, where he learned to play the flute and piano; he also spent a year studying metalwork at a technical college. After graduating, May briefly worked in a number of jobs including for a car dealer, at a jewellery shop, in a pub, at a hospital in Chelsea as a records officer and had a short stint in the civil service. He then took up journalism and broadcasting in his thirties. He also held a part-time job as a moulder at the foundry his father was employed at and suggested in a 2017 interview with The Times that this formed his interest in mechanics.

== Journalism career ==
In 1989, May began working as a sub-editor for The Engineer and later for Autocar magazine in the early 1990s, from which he was dismissed for performing a prank. He subsequently wrote car review columns for Scotland on Sunday and Country Life and revealed in a 2025 interview with The Times that he was also sacked from those two positions. He has since written for several publications, including the regular column England Made Me in Car Magazine, articles for Top Gear magazine, and a weekly column in The Daily Telegraph.

He has written the book May on Motors (2006), which is a collection of his published articles, and co-authored Oz and James's Big Wine Adventure (2006), based on the TV series of the same name. He wrote the afterword to Long Lane with Turnings, published in September 2006, the final book by motoring writer L. J. K. Setright. In the same month, he co-presented a tribute to Raymond Baxter. Notes From The Hard Shoulder and James May's 20th Century, a book to accompany the television series of the same name, were published in 2007.

=== Dismissal from Autocar ===
James May's hidden message

In an interview with Richard Allinson on BBC Radio 2, May confessed that in 1992 he was dismissed from Autocar magazine after putting together an acrostic in one issue. At the end of the year, the magazine's "Road Test Yearbook" supplement was published. Each spread featured four reviews and each review started with a large red letter (known in typography as an initial or a drop cap). May's role was to put the entire supplement together.

To alleviate the tedium, May wrote each review such that the initials on the first four spreads read "ROAD", "TEST", "YEAR" and "BOOK". Subsequent spreads seemingly had random letters, starting with "SOYO" and "UTHI"; when punctuated, these letters spelt out the message: "So you think it's really good, yeah? You should try making the bloody thing up; it's a real pain in the arse."

In a 2019 interview with Carscoops.com, May stated that while the hidden message originally passed through the magazine's pre-printing review processes unnoticed, he was found out when readers began calling in to Autocar's offices, thinking there might be a prize involved. Upon learning of this, the magazine's management called for May to be fired.

== Television career ==
His past television credits include presenting Driven on Channel 4 in 1998, narrating an eight-part BBC One series called Road Rage School, and co-hosting the ITV1 coverage of the 2006 London Boat Show. He also wrote and presented a Christmas special called James May's Top Toys (for BBC One). James May: My Sisters' Top Toys attempted to investigate the gender divide of toy appeal. In series 3, episode 3 of Gordon Ramsay's The F Word, May managed to beat Ramsay in eating bull penis and rotten shark and with his fish pie recipe.

=== Top Gear ===
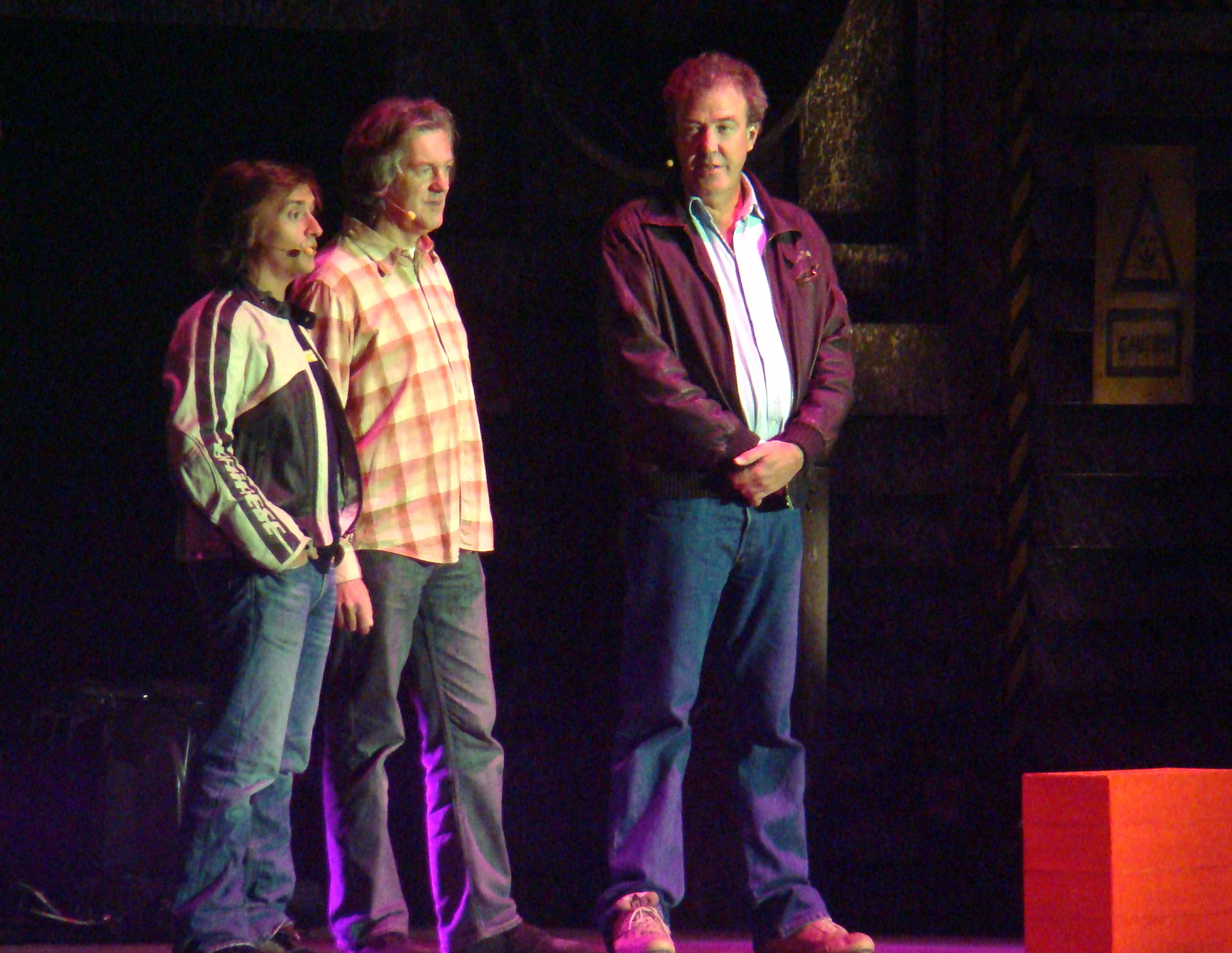
BBC Top Gear presenting team of Richard Hammond, James May and Jeremy Clarkson, 2009

May was briefly a co-presenter of the original Top Gear series in 1999. During an interview in 2020, Jeremy Clarkson claimed that the show's original producers had decided to replace him with May in 1999, though they felt dissatisfied with May as he was soon fired in 2000, shortly before the entire programme was cancelled the following year. In 2002, May auditioned for the new version of Top Gear but was initially rejected by BBC executives who felt that his background was too similar to Clarkson and Hammond's and had limited appeal. Following the first season of Top Gear's relaunch, Clarkson managed to convince the show's producer Andy Wilman in 2003 to rehire May as Jason Dawe's replacement. By May's admission in 2025, he and Clarkson had met during the launch of a new Audi A4 convertible in France and after disagreeing on the car, Clarkson had thought the bickering between them would work on the programme.

May first co-presented the revived series of Top Gear in its second series in 2003, where he earned the nickname "Captain Slow" owing to his careful driving style, and his OCD-like obsessions with order. Despite this sobriquet, he has done some especially high-speed driving – in the 2007 series, he took a Bugatti Veyron to its top speed of 253 mph (407 km/h), then in 2010 he achieved 259.11 mph (417 km/h) in the Veyron's newer 16.4 Super Sport edition. In an earlier episode he also tested the original version of the Bugatti Veyron against the Pagani Zonda F.

May, along with co-presenter Jeremy Clarkson and an Icelandic support crew, travelled by car to the magnetic North Pole in 2007, using a modified Toyota Hilux. In the words of Clarkson, May was the first person to go there "who didn't want to be there". He later drove the same Hilux with new modifications up the side of the erupting volcano Eyjafjallajökull.

Following the BBC's decision not to renew Jeremy Clarkson's contract with the show on 25 March 2015, May stated in April 2015 that he would not continue to present Top Gear as part of a new line-up of presenters.

=== Science ===
May presented Inside Killer Sharks, a documentary for Sky, and James May's 20th Century, investigating inventions. He flew in a Royal Air Force Eurofighter Typhoon at a speed of around 1320 mph (2124 km/h) for his television programme, James May's 20th Century. In late 2008, the BBC broadcast James May's Big Ideas, a three-part series in which May travelled around the globe in search of implementations for concepts widely considered science fiction. He also presented James May's Man Lab from 2010 to 2013. In 2013, May narrated To Space & Back, a documentary on the influence of developments in space exploration on modern technology produced by Sky-Skan and The Franklin Institute. In 2024 May presented James May and the Dull Men searching for "overblown solutions to life's little problems" - which was touted as being a "spiritual successor to Man Lab".

=== James May on the Moon ===
James May on the Moon (BBC 2, 2009) commemorated 40 years since man first landed on the Moon. This was followed by another documentary on BBC Four called James May at the Edge of Space, where May was flown to the stratosphere (70,000 ft) in a US Air Force Lockheed U-2 spy plane. Highlights of the footage from the training for the flight, and the flight itself was used in James May on the Moon, but was shown fully in this programme. This made him one of the highest flying people, along with the pilot, at that time, after the crew of the International Space Station.

=== James May's Toy Stories ===
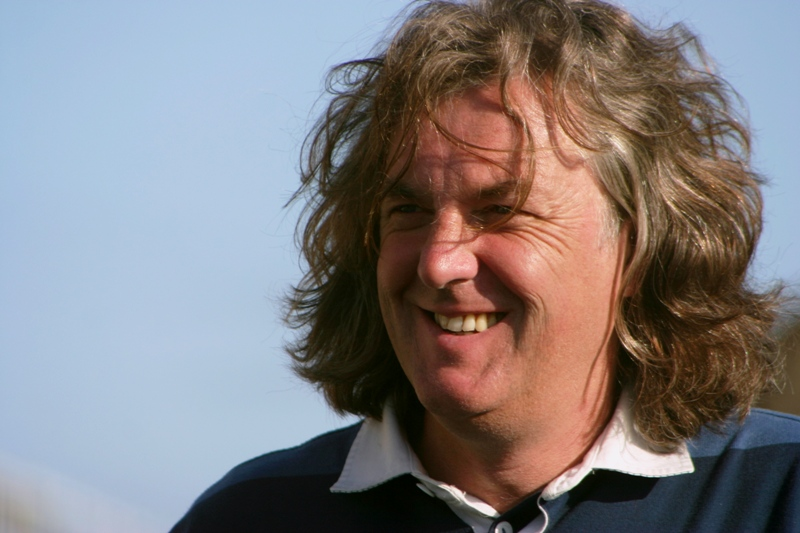
May in 2009 during filming for James May's Toy Stories

Beginning in October 2009, May presented a six-part TV series showing favourite toys of the past era and whether they can be applied in the modern-day. The toys featured were Airfix, Plasticine, Meccano, Scalextric, Lego and Hornby. In each show, May attempts to take each toy to its limits, also fulfilling several of his boyhood dreams in the process. In August 2009, May built a full-sized house out of Lego at Denbies Wine Estate in Surrey. Plans for Legoland to move it to their theme park fell through in September 2009 because costs to deconstruct, move and then rebuild were too high; despite a final Facebook appeal for someone to take it, it was demolished on 22 September, with the plastic bricks planned to be donated to charity.

Also for the series, he recreated the banked track at Brooklands using Scalextric track, and an attempt at the world's longest working model railway along the Tarka Trail between Barnstaple and Bideford in North Devon, although the attempt was foiled due to parts of the track being stolen and vandals placing coins on the track, causing a short circuit. Later, in 2011, May tried for the record again, proposing a race between German model railroad enthusiasts and their British counterparts. The two teams would start at opposite ends along double tracked mainline. This time, the effort succeeded with both teams successfully running three trains the entire route.

A special Christmas Episode called Flight Club, aired in December 2012. In this special, James and his team built a huge toy glider that flew 22 miles (35 km) from Devon to the island of Lundy.

In 2013, May created a life-size, fully functional motorcycle and sidecar made entirely out of the construction toy Meccano. Joined by Oz Clarke, he then completed a full lap of the Isle of Man TT Course, a full 37 3/4 mile-long circuit.

=== Oz and James ===
In late 2006, the BBC broadcast Oz and James's Big Wine Adventure, a series in which May, a committed bitter drinker, travelled around France with wine expert Oz Clarke. A second series was broadcast in late 2007, this time with May and Clarke in the Californian wine country, and was followed by a third series in 2009 called Oz and James Drink to Britain.

=== James May: Our Man in... ===
James May: Our Man in... is a series of travel documentaries hosted by May where he journeys across the breadth of a given country, commenting on idiosyncrasies and notable features along the way. During his journeys he is assisted by various guides and translators, as well as the production team itself - frequently breaking the fourth wall to argue with the director Tom over tasks or segments. In October 2024, May confirmed the series had been cancelled.

==== James May: Our Man in Japan ====
In January 2020, May journeyed from the north end of Japan to its south. Over the course of three months, May explores and participate in many activities to truly understand the country which has intrigued him for a long time. During the trip he passes through major cities such as Tokyo and Kyoto as well as smaller towns and villages such as Nagoro and the evacuated Namie near the Fukushima power plant.

==== James May: Our Man in the USA ====
The original second series was intended to be in America, but cancelled due to logistics and the COVID-19 pandemic.

==== James May: Our Man in Italy ====
A second series was commissioned in July 2022 with May on a journey throughout the regions of Italy from Palermo to the Dolomites on a trip exploring the culture, food, and more. Hoping to understand the Italian concept of la dolce vita May is given a fashion makeover, becomes a gladiator in Rome and makes childish jokes about cheese.

==== James May: Our Man in India ====
Series three began in January 2024 traversing the country of India. Starting in Mumbai he progresses through places such as Delhi, the Taj Mahal and Kolkata to the foothills of the Himalays, celebrating Holi, going on tiger patrol in Sundarbans, and playing the part of "Professor" in the Bengali series Yuganayak Swami Vivekananda.

== Internet presence ==
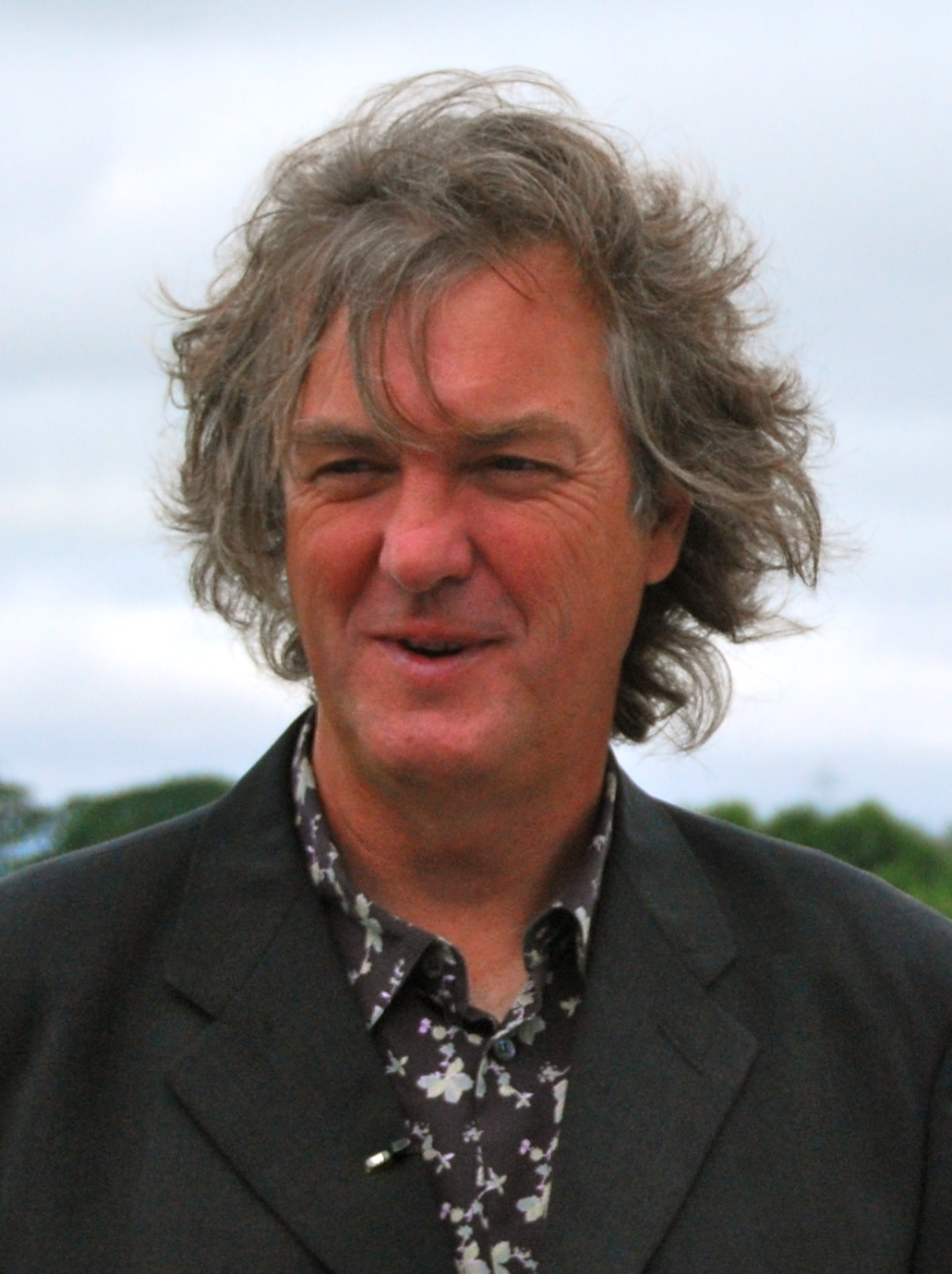
May in 2010

May created Head Squeeze (now renamed "BBC Earth Lab"; May no longer features as a presenter). The channel is a mix of science, technology, history and current affairs. The first video was published in December 2012. Videos are produced by 360 Production for BBC Worldwide.

May created his own YouTube channel, titled "JM's Unemployment Tube", in 2015 after Top Gear was postponed by the BBC following Jeremy Clarkson's dismissal. Mainly featuring cooking videos filmed from his kitchen, as well as mock builds of Airfix models, the channel has over 241,000 subscribers as of November 2026.

He has since moved on and created a new channel, titled "James May's Planet Gin" where he covers similar topics as on his previous channel but with a higher production quality. He also promotes his own gin business "James Gin" which he has been running since 2021. As of November 2026, the channel has approximately 999,000 subscribers.

In 2016, May launched, with his former Top Gear presenters, a social network for motoring fans called DriveTribe.

In 2019, May moved on to created videos on a Drivetribe spin-off brand Foodtribe (replacing JM's Unemployment Tube) frequently using a small, bedsit-like kitchen setup called "The Bug-out Bunker". The channel has since been rebranded as "What Next?"

May became an Internet meme when one of his Foodtribe videos went viral. In it, while preparing to make two cheese sandwiches, May bluntly uttered the word "cheese" after placing a block of Red Leicester on a table. The quote went viral, and was used in various memes and image macros.

== Personal life ==
May currently owns homes in Wiltshire and Hammersmith, West London, with art critic Sarah Frater, with whom he has been in a relationship since 2000. In July 2010, May was awarded an honorary doctorate by Lancaster University, where he had previously studied music. He holds a Doctor of Letters degree. In 2020, May bought half the ownership of a pub in Swallowcliffe, Wiltshire, the Royal Oak, which dates from the early 18th century and is a Grade II listed building.

=== Views and advocacy ===
In August 2014, May was one of 200 public figures who were signatories to a letter to The Guardian expressing their hope that Scotland would vote against independence from the United Kingdom in September's referendum on that issue and supported Scotland remaining part of the UK.

In June 2016, he supported Remain in the EU referendum. May has described his political leanings as "liberal". During a 2024 interview with The Daily Telegraph on the topics of masculinity, hobbies and the impact of politics on the car industry, May argued "I believe in progress, in the modern world" but criticised the effects of what he termed the "wokerati" on broadcast media for encouraging negative stereotypes that traditional engineering pursuits are "pale, male and stale" and said "You do see people saying white men are the root of all problems, and I'm sure we have been the root of many of them. But I certainly don't feel obliged to go round apologising for being an old white man, because I can operate a screw-cutting lathe and most people can't."

In March 2026, May said he was "not religious", though he described himself as a "nominal and cultural Christian."

=== Vehicles ===
May has owned many cars. These include a 2005 Saab 9-5 Aero, Bentley T2, Rolls-Royce Phantom, Triumph 2000, Rover P6, Alfa Romeo 164, 1971 Rolls-Royce Corniche, Triumph Vitesse, Jaguar XJS, 1992 Range Rover Classic Vogue, Datsun 120Y, Vauxhall Cavalier Mk1, a Ferrari 308 GTB, a 2015 Toyota Mirai, a 2021 Toyota Mirai, Ferrari F430, Ferrari 458 Italia, 1984 Porsche 911 Turbo, a 2019 Tesla Model S 100D, a 2016 BMW i3, and a 2005 Porsche Boxster S (which he claims is the first car he has ever purchased new).

May currently owns a 2010 Porsche 911 Carrera S facelift, a 2018 Alpine A110, a Fiat Panda, a Volkswagen Polo, a Tesla Model 3 Highland, a prototype 1989 Rover Mini Cooper RSP, "a couple of Land Rovers", a Triumph Stag, a 2015 Ferrari 458 Speciale which he ordered following his exit from Top Gear and a VW Beach Buggy rebuilt from the one used in Grand Tour special "The Beach Buggy Boys". He often uses a Brompton folding bicycle for commuting. He passed his driving test on his second attempt and justified this by saying "All the best people pass the second time".

May obtained a light aircraft pilot's licence in October 2006, having trained at White Waltham Airfield. He has owned a Luscombe 8A Silvaire, a Cessna A185E Skywagon, and an American Champion 8KCAB Super Decathlon with registration G-OCOK, which serves as a reference to a common phrase attributed to him.

== Filmography ==
=== Television ===
Year	Title	Role
1998	Driven	Presenter
1999	Top Gear (original run)	Presenter
2003–2015, 2021	Top Gear	Presenter
2005	James May's Top Toys	Presenter
2006–2007	Oz and James's Big Wine Adventure	Presenter
2007	Top Gear of the Pops	Presenter
2007	James May's 20th Century	Presenter
2007	James May: My Sisters' Top Toys	Presenter
2008	Top Ground Gear Force	Presenter
2008	James May's Big Ideas	Presenter
2009	Oz and James Drink to Britain	Presenter
2009	James May on the Moon	Presenter
2009	James May at the Edge of Space	Presenter
2009–2014	James May's Toy Stories	Presenter
2010	Shooting Stars	Guest
2010–2013	James May's Man Lab	Presenter
2011–2012	James May's Things You Need to Know	Presenter
2014–2016	James May's Cars of the People	Presenter
2014	Phineas and Ferb	Ian
2015	Building Cars Live	Presenter
2016–2017	James May: The Reassembler	Presenter
2016–2024	The Grand Tour	Presenter
2019	James May's Big Trouble in Model Britain	Presenter
2019	Al Murray's Great British Pub Quiz	Guest
2020–2024	James May: Our Man in...	Presenter
2020–2023	James May: Oh Cook!	Presenter
2023	Little Trains & Big Names with Pete Waterman	Guest
2023	Yuganayak Swami Vivekananda	Professor
2024	James May and the Dull Men	Presenter
2025	The Great Explorers with James May	Presenter
2025	The Not Very Grand Tour	Presenter
2025	Perfect Pub Walks with Alexander Armstrong	Guest
2025	Clarkson's Farm	Guest
2025	James May's Shed Load of Ideas	Presenter
2026	James May: The Human Machine (w/t)	Presenter
2026	The Grand-ish Tour	Presenter
2026	The Grand Tour	Guest

=== DVD ===
Year	Title	Label
2006	Oz & James' Big Wine Adventure: Series One	Acorn Media
2006	James May's Motormania Car Quiz	DMD
2007	James May's 20th Century: The Complete Series	ITV
2008	Oz & James' Big Wine Adventure: Series Two	Acorn Media
2009	James May's Big Ideas: The Complete Series	DMD
2009	James May on the Moon	BBC DVD
2009	James May's Amazing Brain Trainer	DMD
2009	James May's Toy Stories: The Complete Series	Channel 4
2009	Oz and James Drink to Britain	Acorn Media
2010	Top Gear: Apocalypse	BBC DVD
2011	James May's Man Lab: Series One	Acorn Media
2011	Top Gear: At The Movies	BBC DVD
2012	James May's Man Lab: Series Two	Acorn Media
2012	Top Gear: Worst Car in the History of the World	BBC DVD
2013	James May's Man Lab: Series Three	Acorn Media
2013	James May's Toy Stories: Balsa Wood Glider/Great Train Race	Channel 4
2014	James May's Toy Stories: The Motorcycle Diaries	Channel 4
2014	James May's Toy Stories: Action Man at the Speed of Sound	Channel 4
2016	James May: The Reassembler: Series One	Spirit Entertainment Limited
2017	James May: The Reassembler: Series Two	Spirit Entertainment Limited

=== Video games ===
Year	Title	Developer	Role
2013	Forza Motorsport 5	Turn 10 Studios	Voice over
2015	Forza Motorsport 6	Turn 10 Studios	Voice over
2019	The Grand Tour Game	Amazon Game Studios	Voice over

=== Television advertisements ===
Year	Title	Role
2010	London Pride	Himself
2015	The Tank Museum	Himself

== Bibliography ==
- May on Motors: On the Road with James May. Virgin Books. 2006. Reprinted 2007. ISBN 9780753511862
- Oz and James's Big Wine Adventure. BBC Books. 2006. ISBN 9780563539001
- Notes from the Hard Shoulder. Virgin Books. 2007. ISBN 9780753512029
- James May's 20th Century. Hodder & Stoughton. 2007 (H/B). Reprinted 2007 (P/B). ISBN 9780340950906
- James May's Magnificent Machines. Hodder & Stoughton. 2008. ISBN 9780340950920
- Oz and James Drink to Britain. Pavilion (Anova). 2009. ISBN 9781862058460
- James May's Car Fever. Hodder & Stoughton. 2009 (H/B). Reprinted 2010 (P/B). ISBN 9780340994559
- James May's Toy Stories. Conway (Anova). 2009. ISBN 9781844861071
- James May's Toy Stories: Lego House. Conway (Anova). 2010. ISBN 9781844861187
- James May's Toy Stories: Airfix Handbook. Conway (Anova). 2010. ISBN 9781844861163
- James May's Toy Stories: Scalextric Handbook. Conway (Anova). 2010. ISBN 9781844861170
- How to Land an A330 Airbus. Hodder & Stoughton. 2010 (H/B). Reprinted 2011 (P/B). ISBN 9781402269554
- James May's Man Lab: The Book of Usefulness. Hodder & Stoughton. 2011 (H/B). Reprinted 2012 (P/B) ISBN 9781444736328
- James May: On Board. Hodder & Stoughton. 2012. ISBN 9780340994597
- James May: The Reassembler. Hodder & Stoughton. 2017. ISBN 9781473656932
- James May: Oh Cook!. Pavilion. 2020. ISBN 9781911663157
- Carbolics: A Personal Motoring Disinfectant. Hodder & Stoughton. 2022. ISBN 9781399713702

== Britcar 24 Hour results ==
Year	Team	Co-Drivers	Car	Car No.	Class	Laps	Pos.	Class Pos.	Ref
2007	(United Kingdom) Team Top Gear	(United Kingdom) Jeremy Clarkson (United Kingdom) "The Stig" (United Kingdom) Richard Hammond	BMW 330d	78	4	396	39th	3rd	

Preceded by David Tremayne	Guild of Motoring Writers; Journalist of the Year Award; 2000	Succeeded by David Tremayne
