= Food and Drink =

British television series

- Country of origin: United Kingdom
- Original language: English
- No. of series: 23 (original); 3 (revival)
- No. of episodes: 371 (original); 27 (revival)

Production
- Running time: 30 minutes
- Production company: Bazal Productions

Original release
- Network: BBC Two
- Release: 6 July 1982 – 13 April 2015

Food and Drink is a British television series on BBC Two. First broadcast between 1982 and 2002, it was the first national television programme in the UK to cover the subject of food and drink without cookery and recipe demonstrations.

== History ==
The first series was presented by Simon Bates and Gillian Miles, and introduced Jilly Goolden in her first regular television appearances as the programme's wine expert.

Russell Harty presented filmed location reports from exceptional restaurants around Britain. This series featured the innovative idea of a small contributing audience of 20 people who were called "tasters and testers". The first series broadcast in the summer months but drew an average audience of 1.5 million a week, a high rating for BBC Two in the summer in the 1980s.

Later series were presented by Chris Kelly and chef Michael Barry with wine experts Jilly Goolden and Oz Clarke.

A spin-off panel game, Food and Drink Summer Quiz, aired during the main show's summer break in 1987.

=== Revival ===
Food and Drink returned to BBC Two on 4 February 2013 stylized as Food & Drink, co-hosted by Michel Roux Jr and Kate Goodman. A Christmas special aired on 18 December 2013, followed by a second series in early 2014.

A third series was broadcast in 2015. Michel Roux Jr was replaced by Tom Kerridge as main presenter whilst Kate Goodman was replaced by Joe Wadsack.

== Transmissions ==
=== Original ===
==== Series ====
Series	Start date	End date	Episodes
1	6 July 1982	10 August 1982	6
2	28 April 1983	30 June 1983	10
3	8 March 1984	19 April 1984	7
4	25 October 1984	26 February 1985	15
5	29 October 1985	4 March 1986	15
6	30 October 1986	10 March 1987	17
7	27 October 1987	1 March 1988	16
8	15 November 1988	14 March 1989	16
9	28 November 1989	20 March 1990	15
10	30 October 1990	26 February 1991	15
11	15 October 1991	10 March 1992	18
12	20 October 1992	19 March 1993	20
13	26 October 1993	5 April 1994	21
14	8 November 1994	28 February 1995	16
15	24 October 1995	16 April 1996	23
16	5 November 1996	20 May 1997	23
17	4 November 1997	31 March 1998	20
18	14 September 1998	12 April 1999	28
19	26 October 1999	21 March 2000	19
20	6 September 2000	18 October 2000	8
21	9 January 2001	27 March 2001	12
22	16 May 2001	16 October 2001	17
23	11 December 2001	5 March 2002	10

==== Specials ====
Entitle	Air Date
Christmas Special	19 December 1983
Christmas Special	20 December 1984
Anton Goes to Sheffield	28 October 1985
Christmas Special	17 December 1985
Right Again, Anton!	10 November 1986
Christmas Special	17 December 1986
Summer Quiz	6 editions 14 July 1987 – 18 August 1987
Raymond Blanc	26 October 1987
Antonio's Italy	8 November 1988
Christmas Quiz	22 December 1988
Carluccio's Italy	2 editions 12 August 1989 – 19 August 1989
Shepherd's Chinese Challenge	24 November 1989
Christmas Special "Mastercook"	19 December 1989
A Man's Place?	28 October 1990
Christmas Special	18 December 1990
American Special	8 October 1991
Christmas Special	17 December 1991
A Cook's Tour of Central Europe	13 October 1992
The Great Euroguzzle	9 August 1993
Choice Cuts	2 editions 16–23 August 1993
Secrets of the South	1 November 1994
A Taste of the New World	19 December 1994
Christmas Special	17 December 1996

=== Revival ===
==== Series ====
Series	Start date	End date	Episodes
1	4 February 2013	11 March 2013	6
2	27 January 2014	18 August 2014	10
3	2 January 2015	13 April 2015	10

==== Specials ====
Entitle	Air Date
Christmas Special	18 December 2013
